= List of Odonata of Kerala =

The following is a list of the odonates found in Kerala, a state on the southwestern, Malabar Coast of India.

== Suborder: Zygoptera (Damselflies) ==
=== Family: Lestidae (Spread-winged damselflies) ===
==== Genus: Indolestes ====
===== Species: Indolestes gracilis davenporti =====
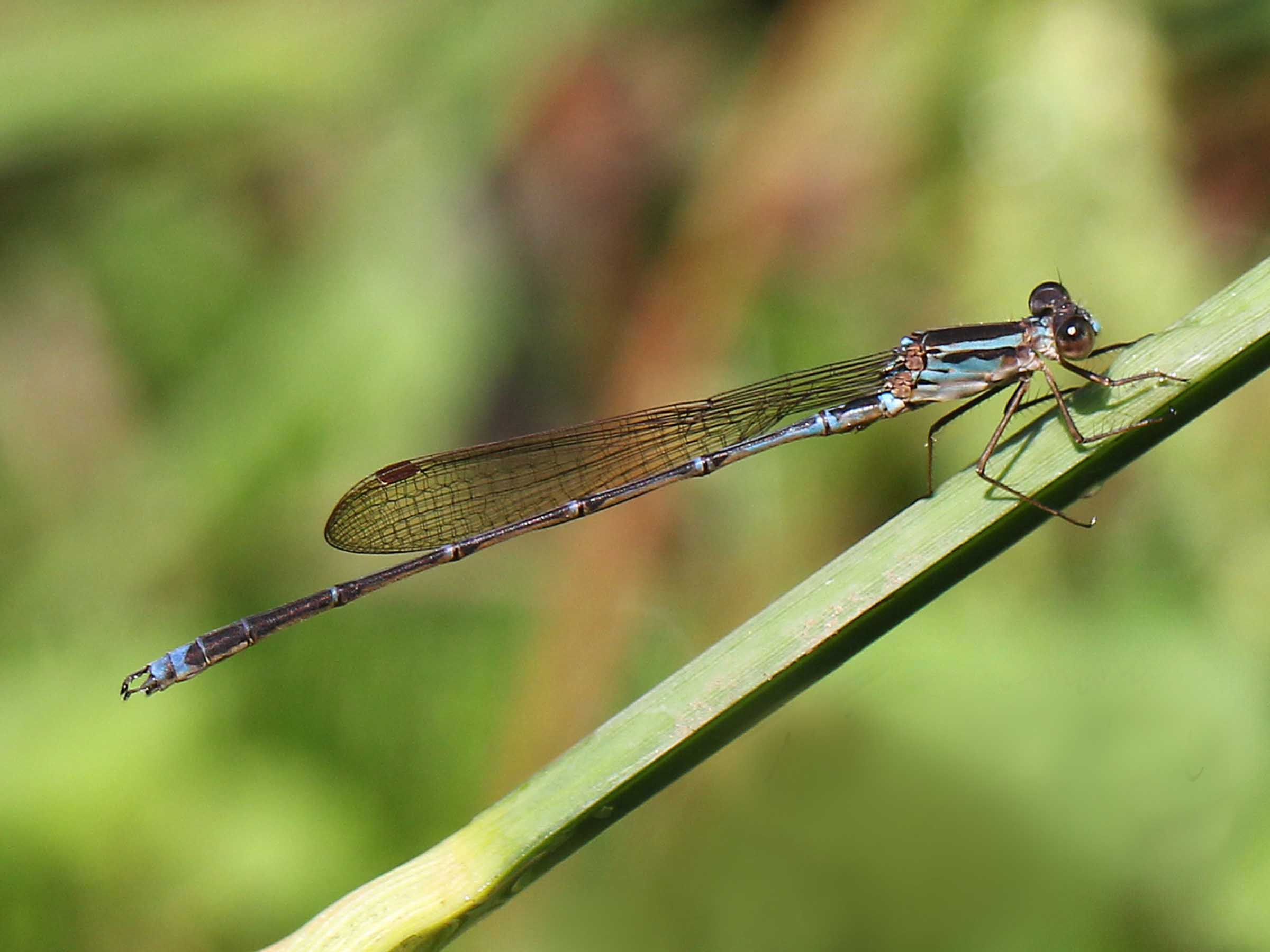
male

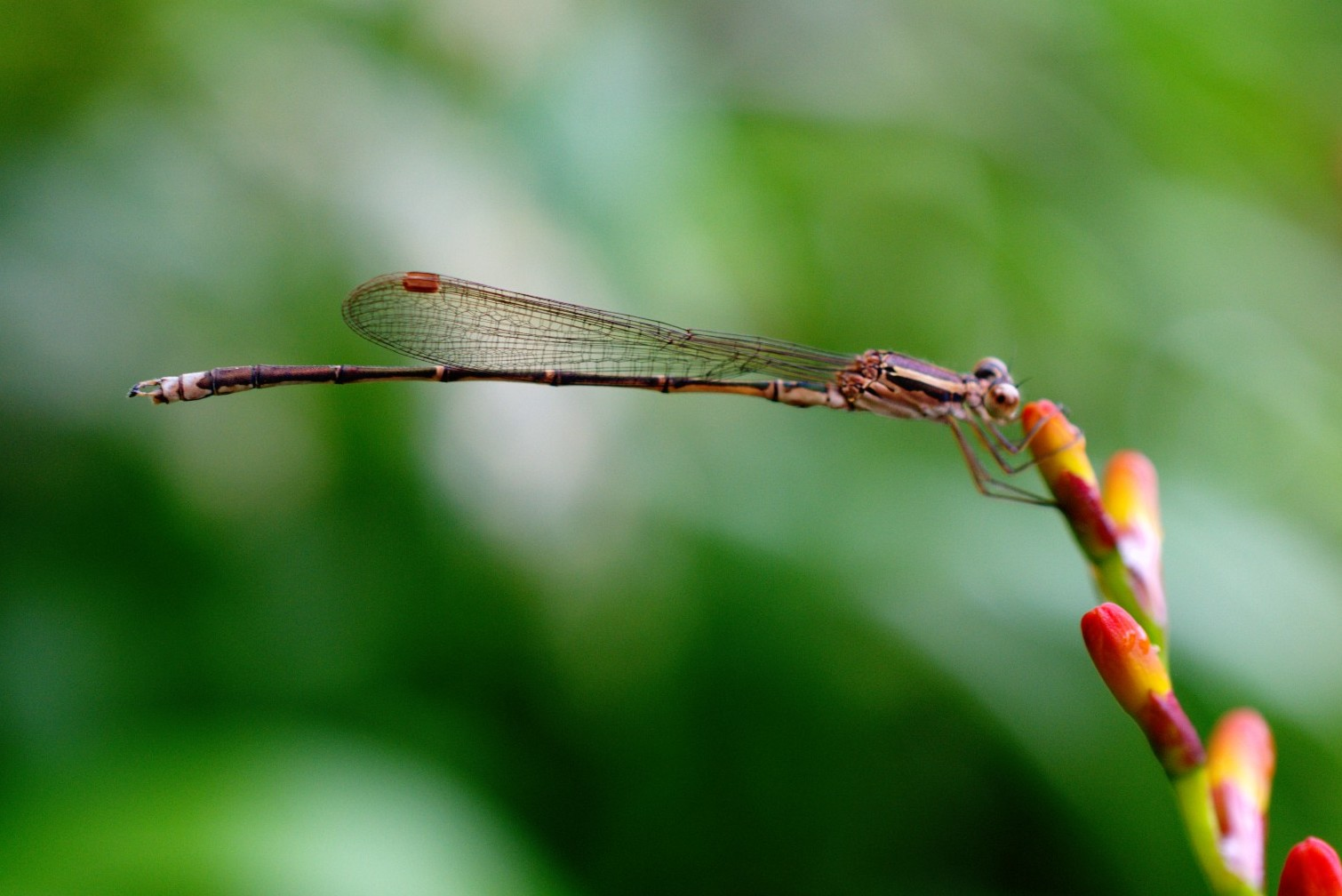
young male

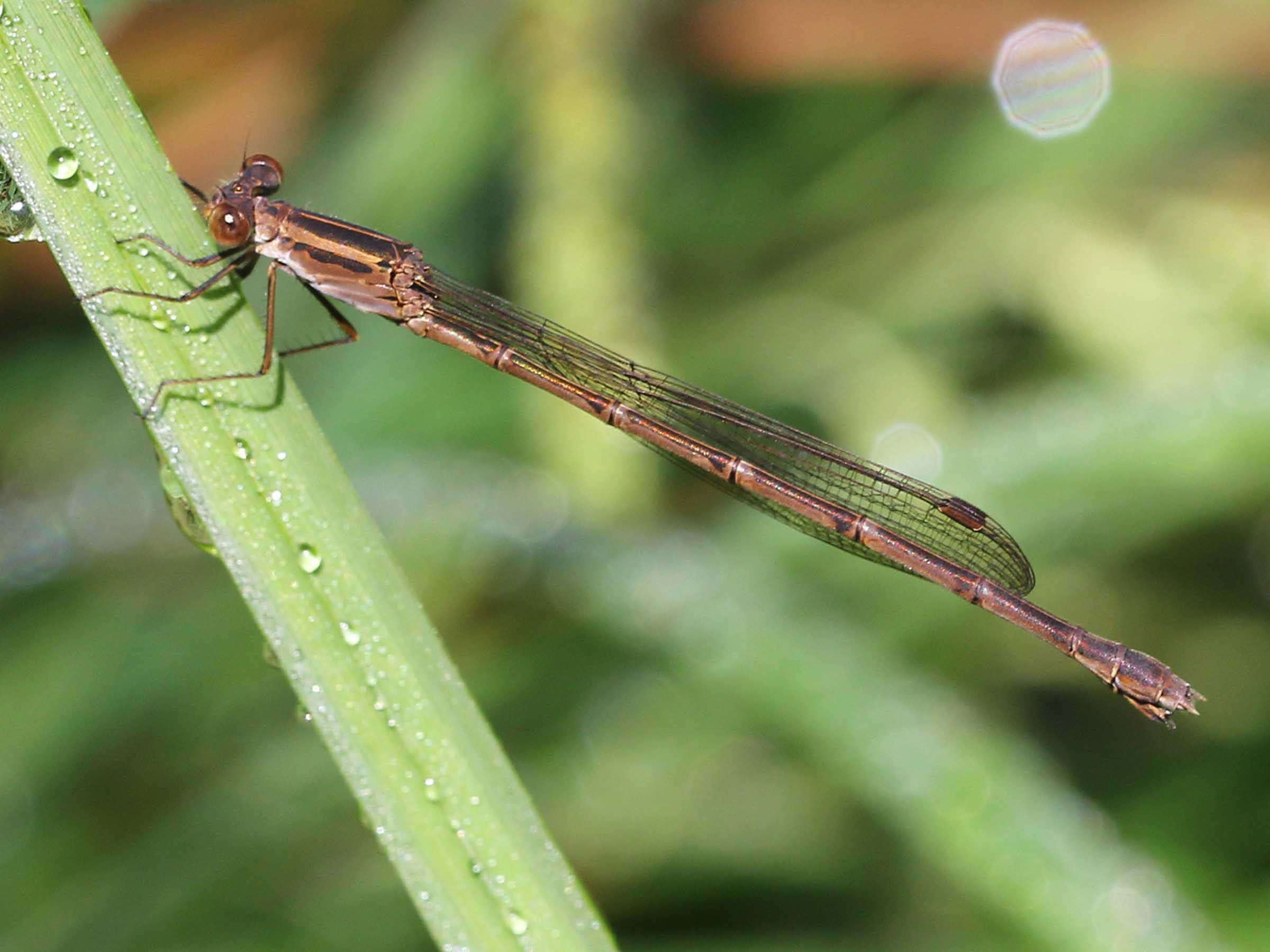
female

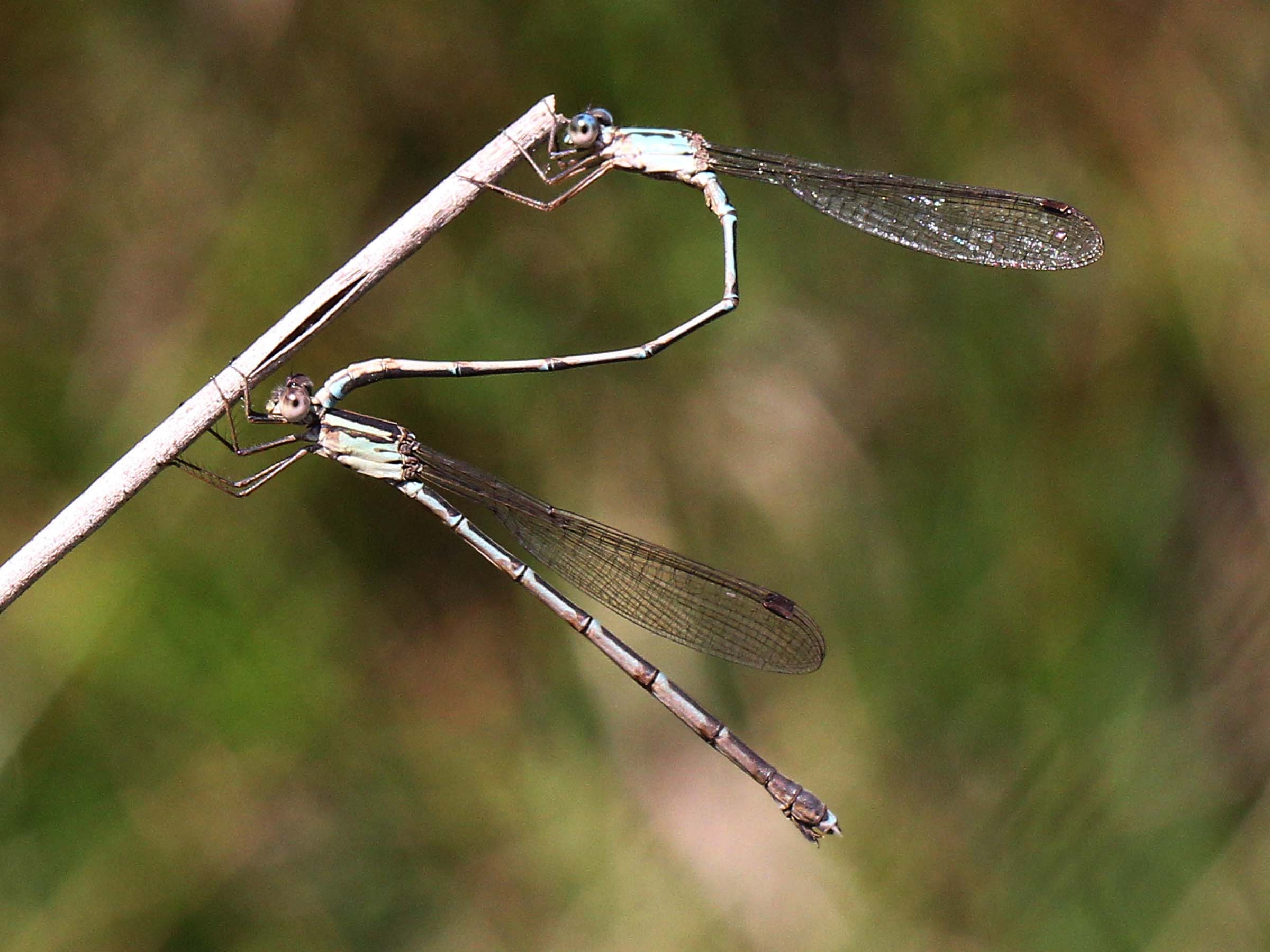
tandem pair

===== Species: Indolestes pulcherrimus =====
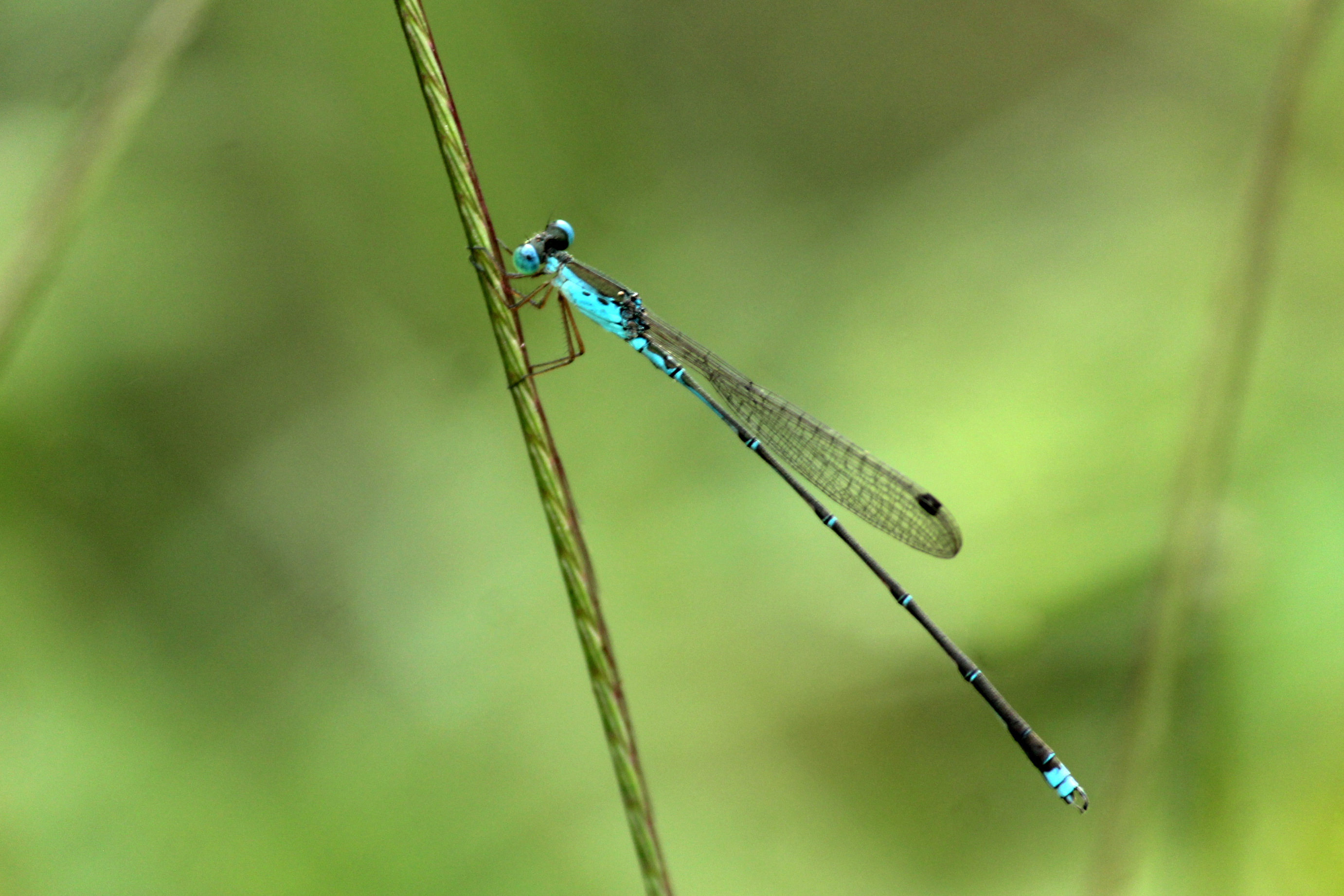
male

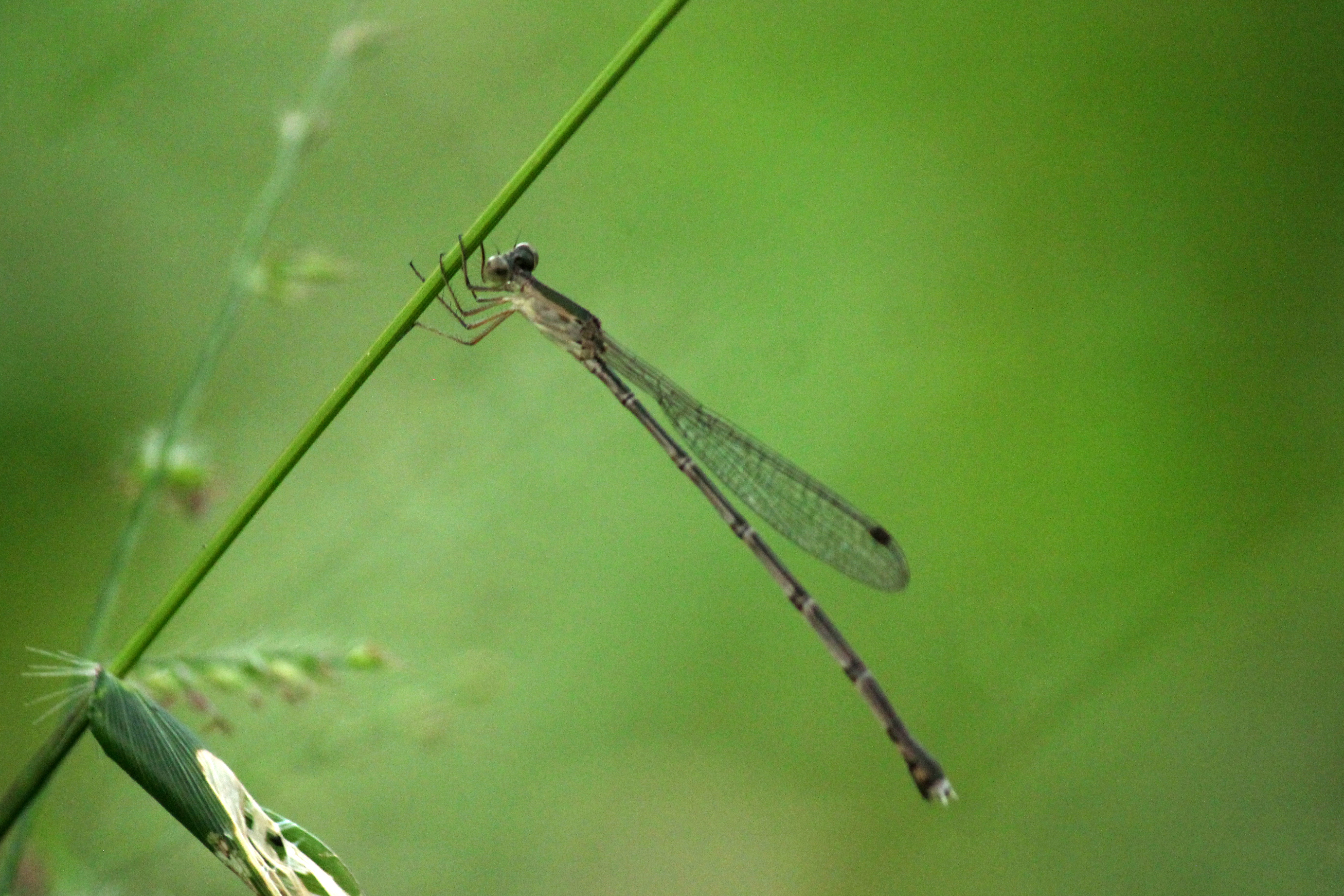
female

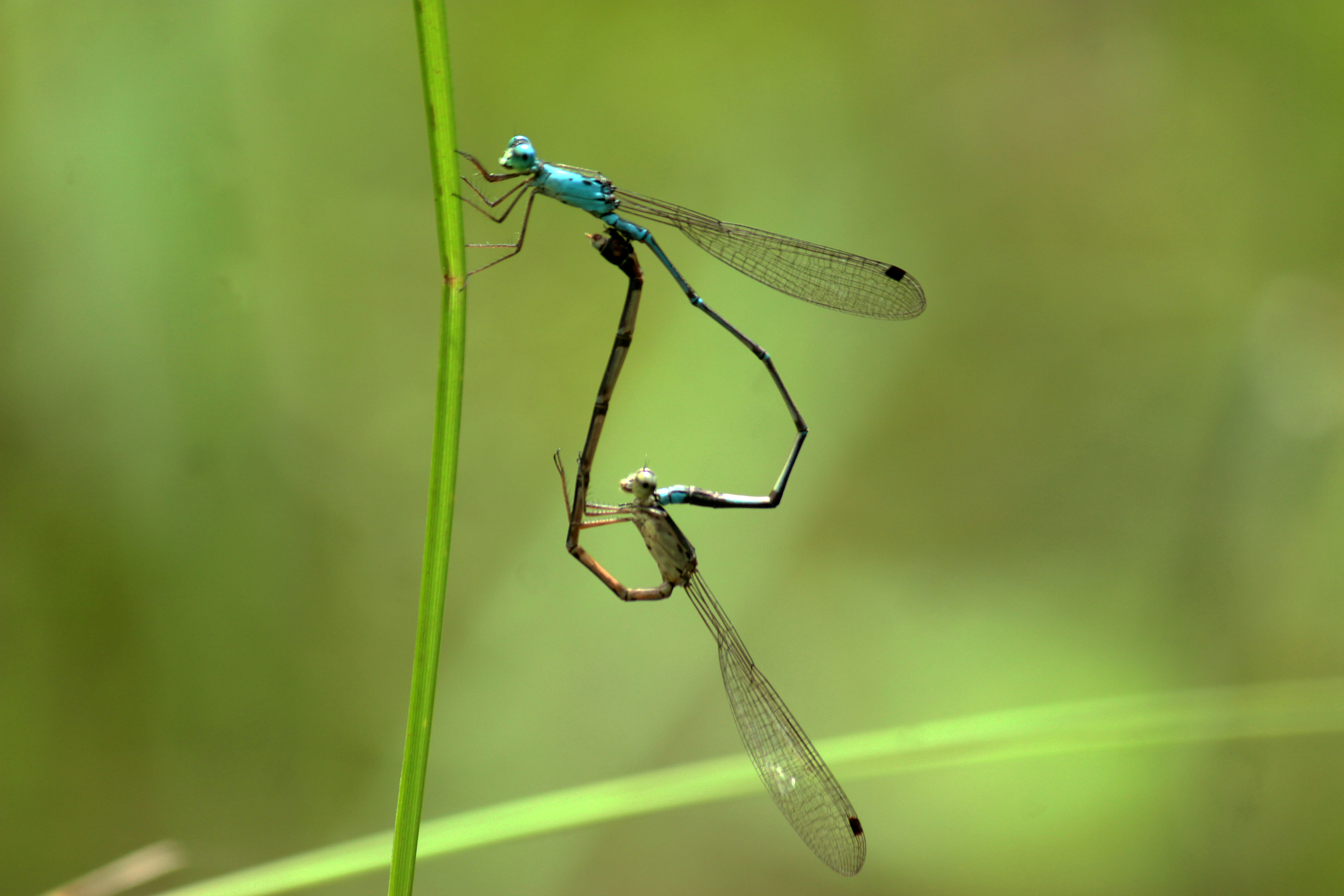
mating pair

==== Genus: Lestes ====
===== Species: Lestes concinnus =====
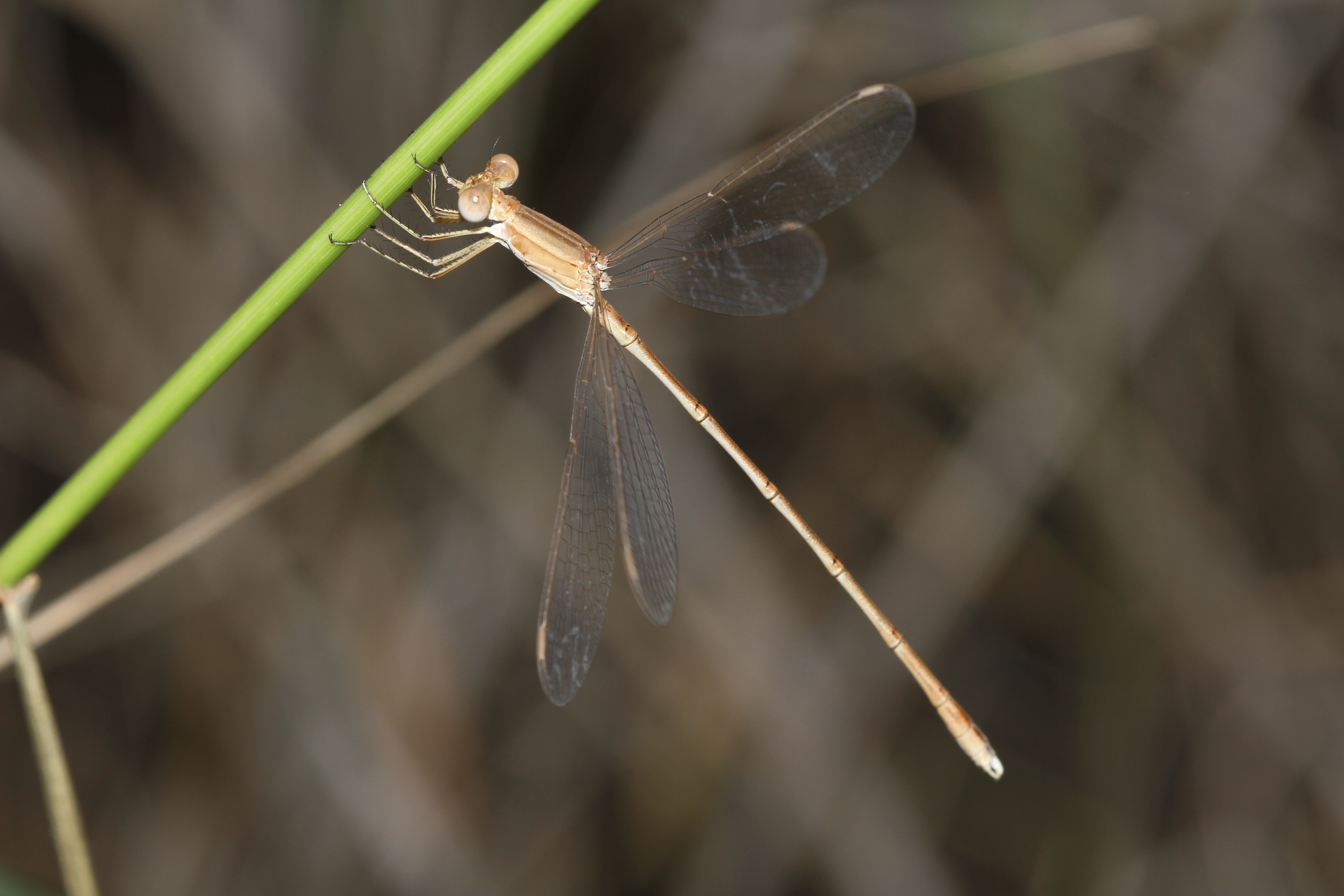
Lestes concinnus male

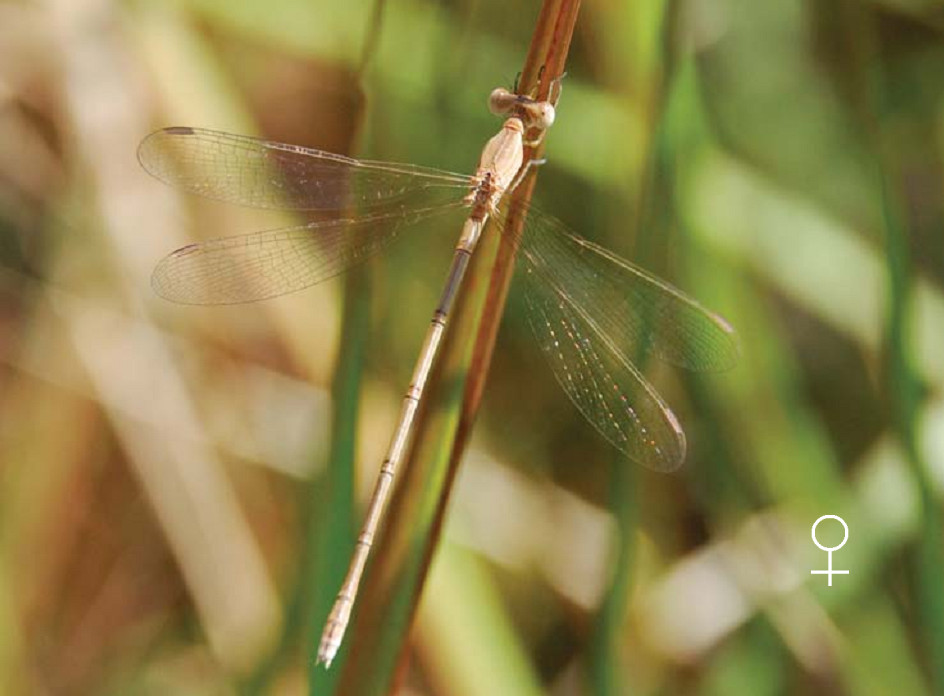
Lestes concinnus female

===== Species: Lestes dorothea =====
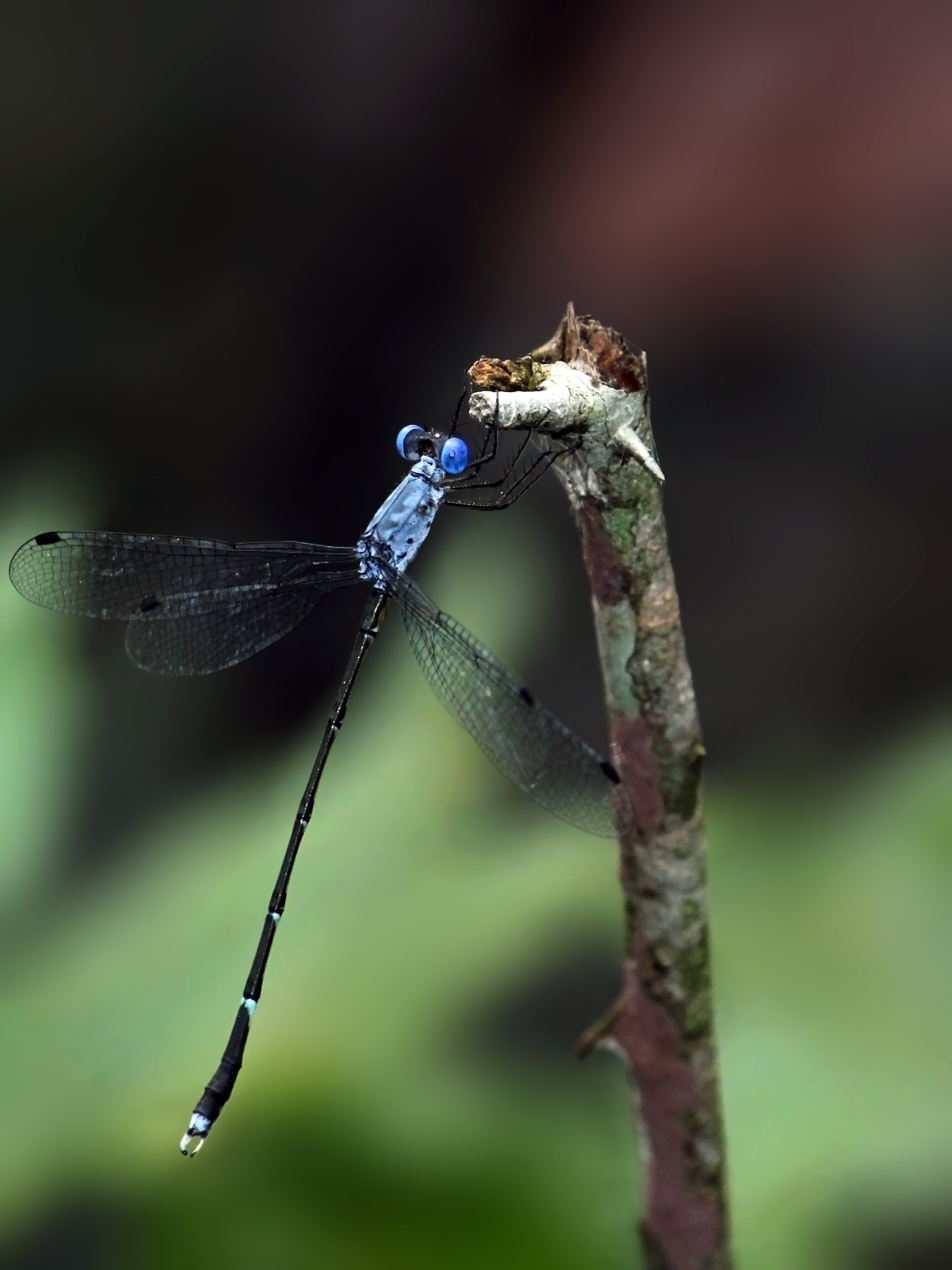
male

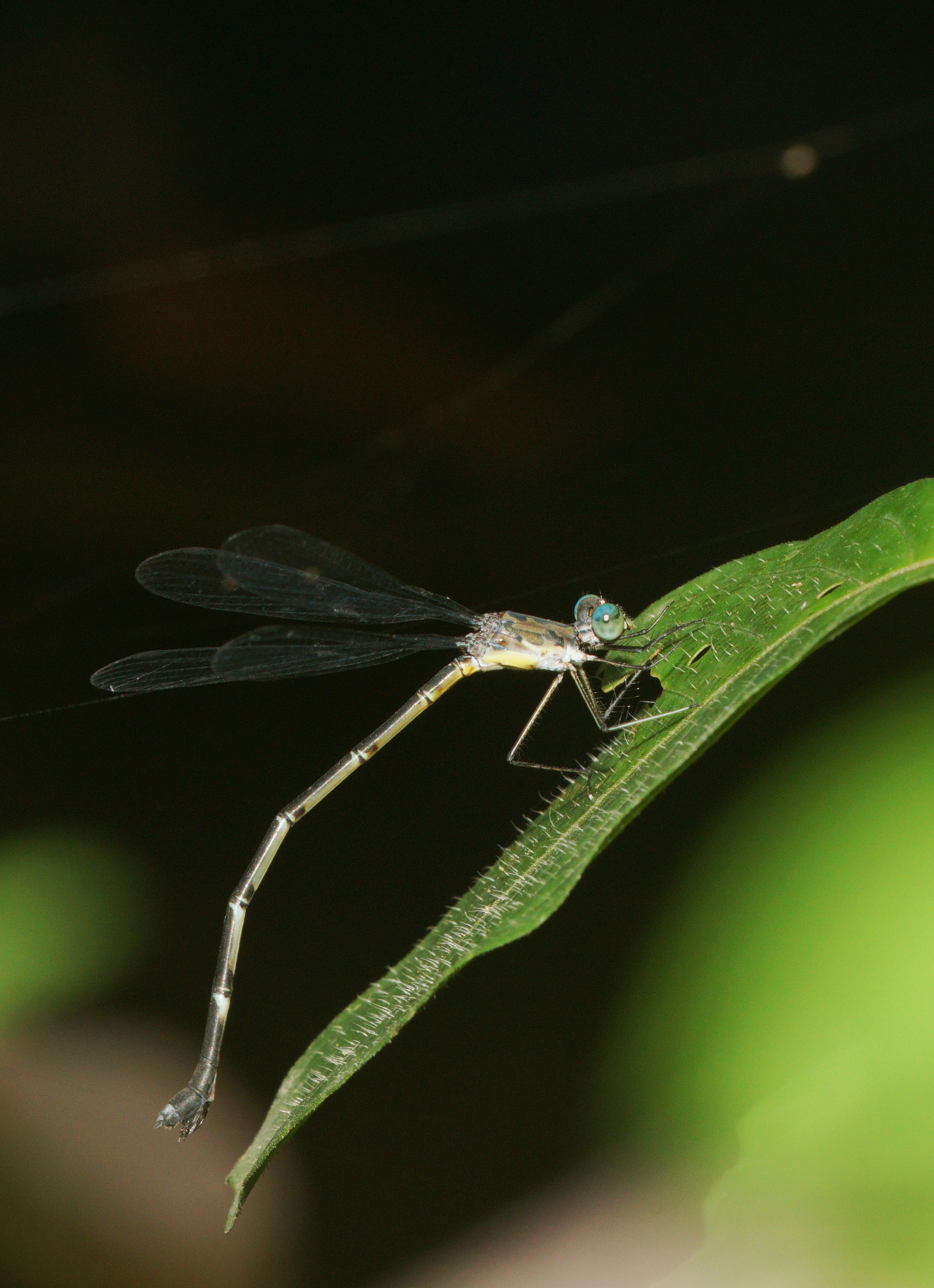
female

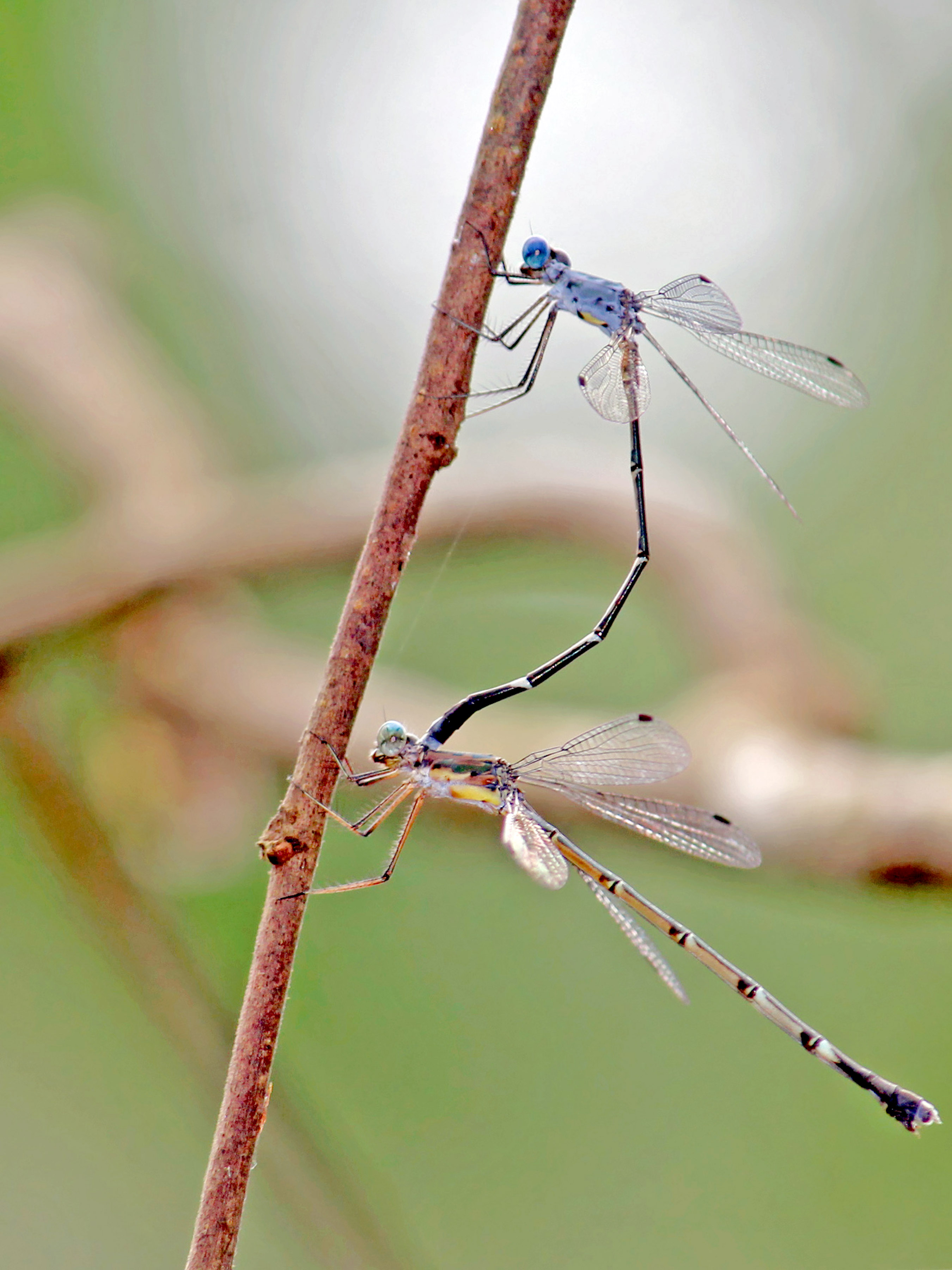
tandem pair

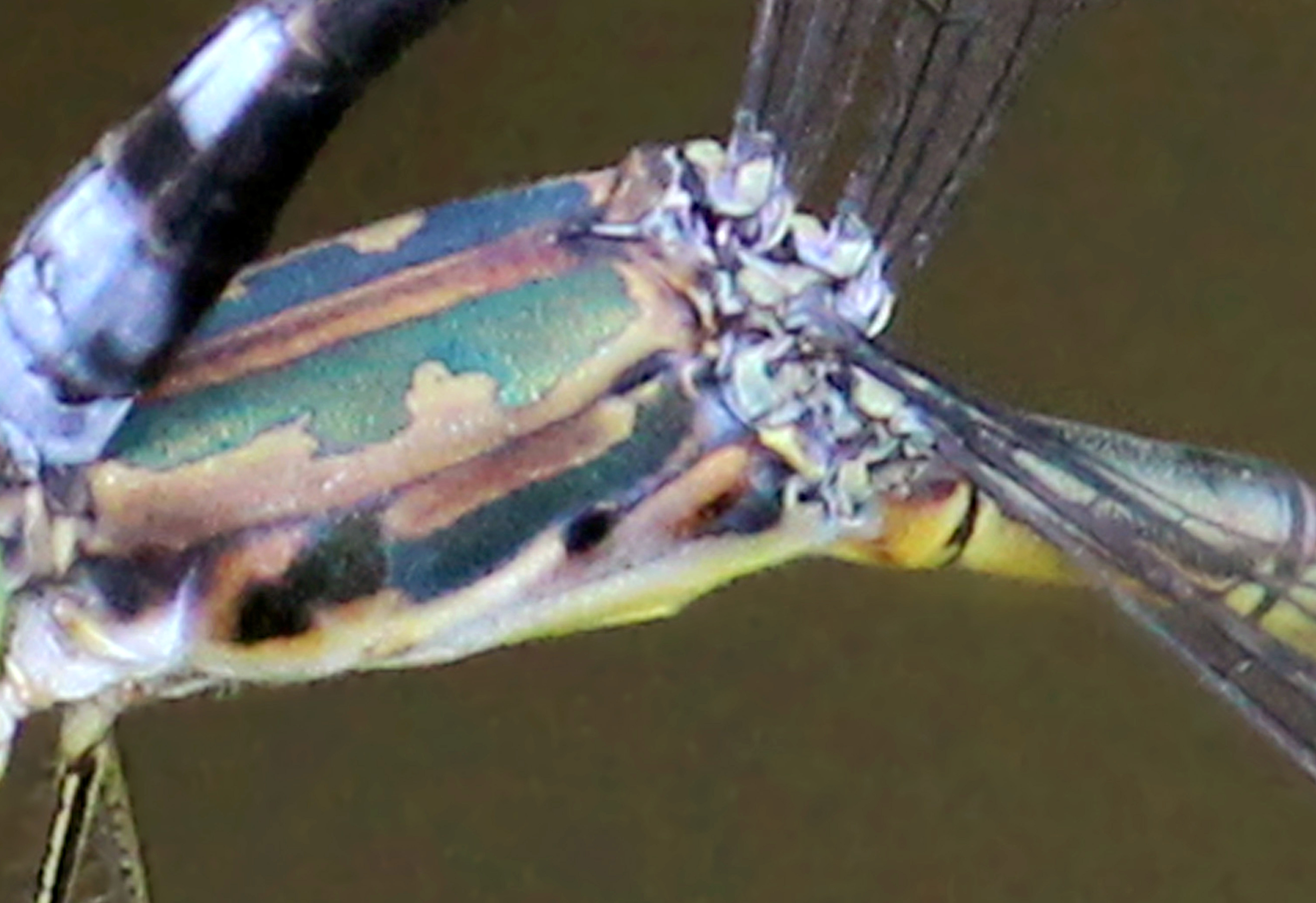
diffuse stripes on the humeral suture

===== Species: Lestes elatus =====
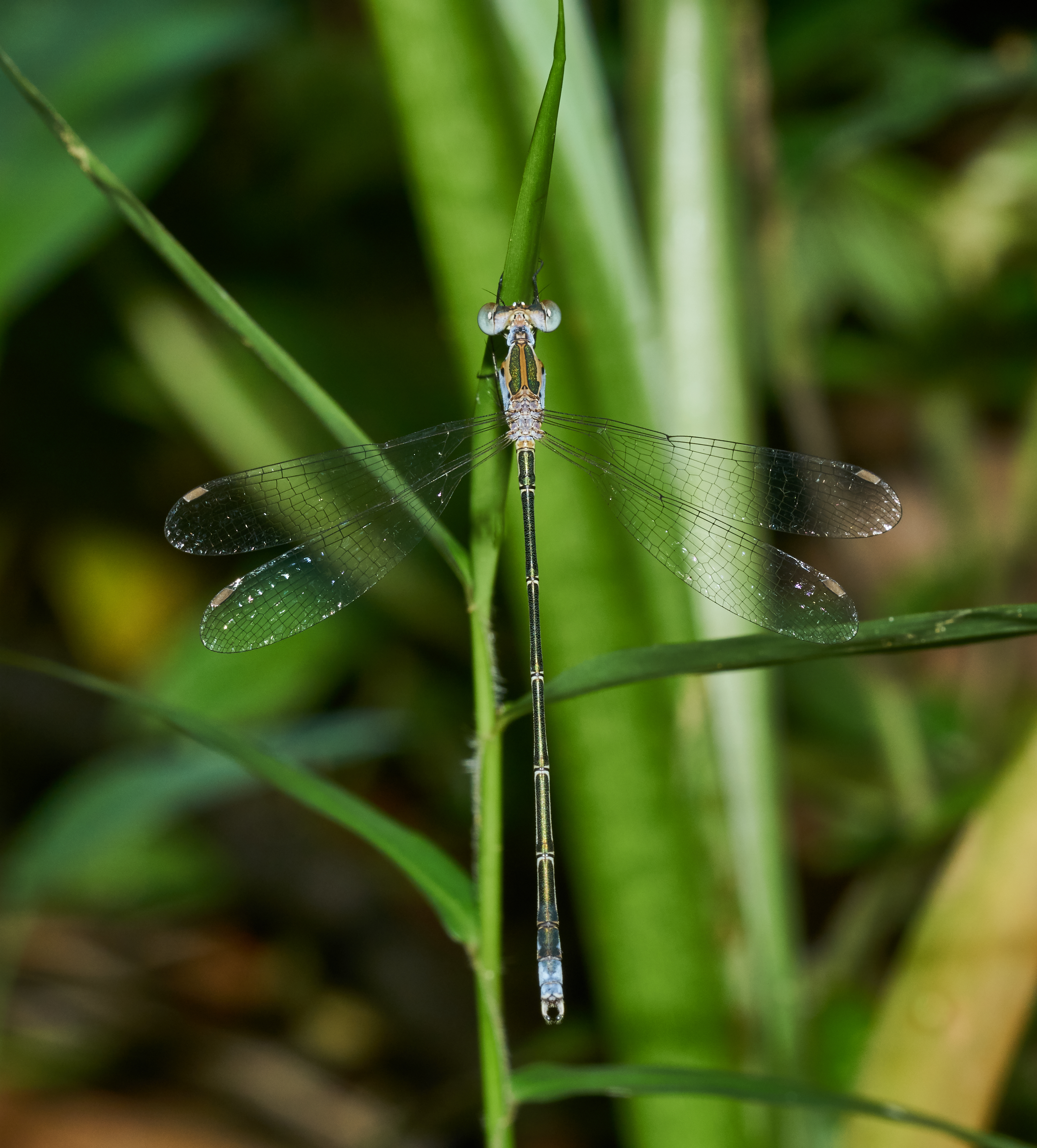
Adult male with pruinescence

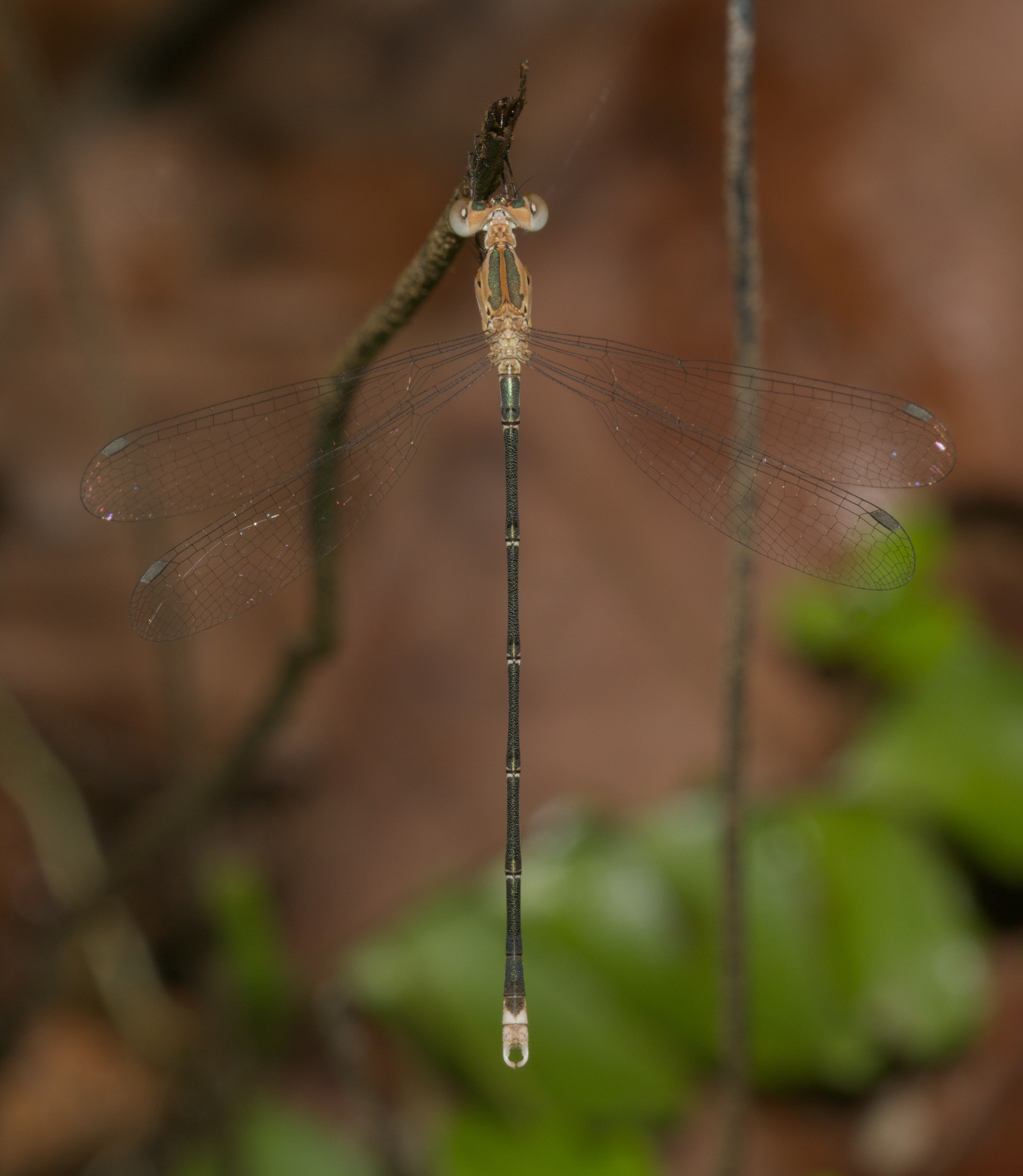
Sub-adult male

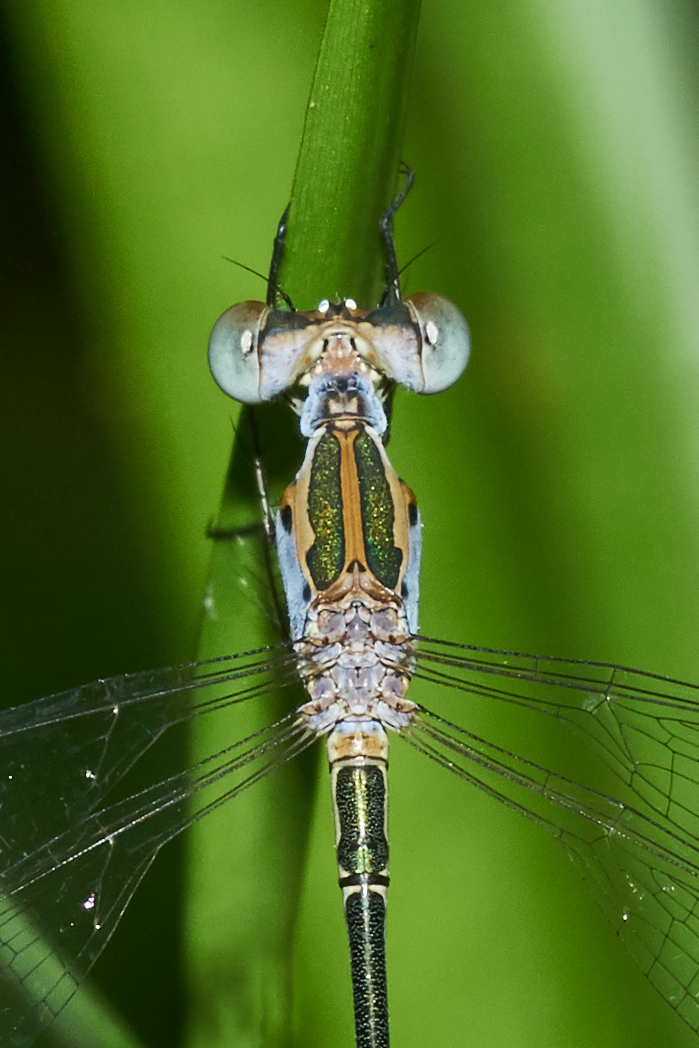
Hockey stick mark on the thorax

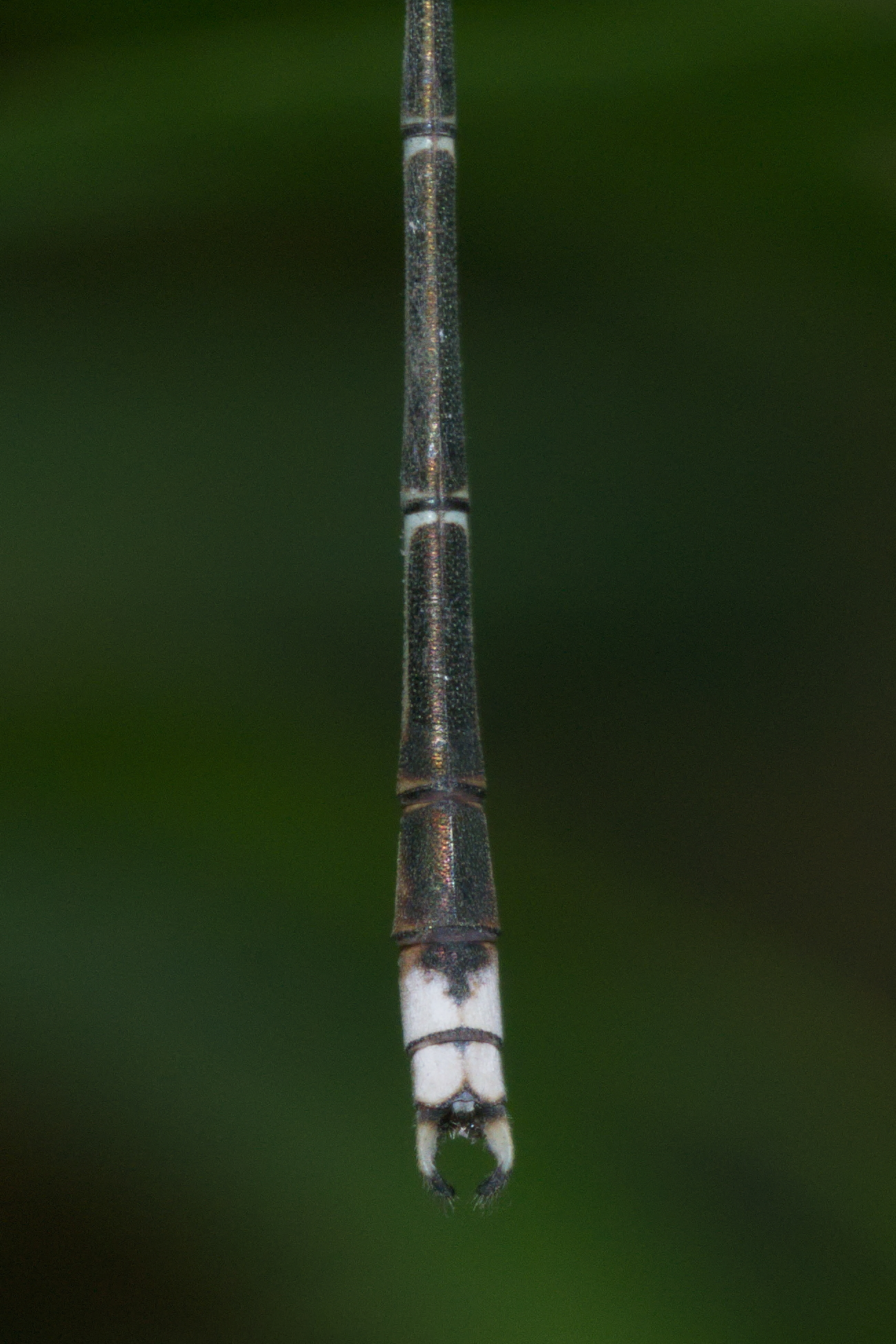
Anal appendages of the male

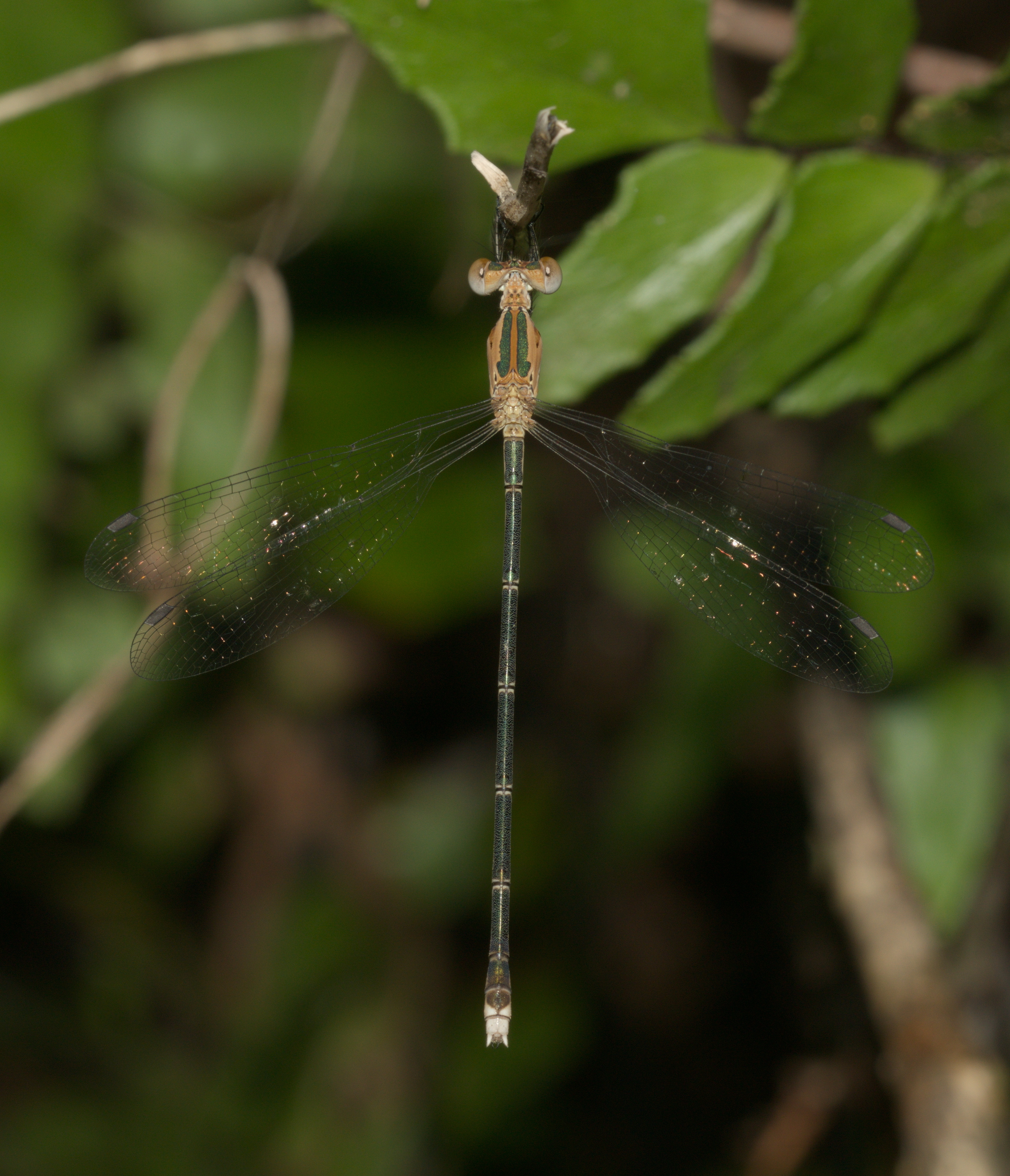
Female

===== Species: Lestes malabaricus =====
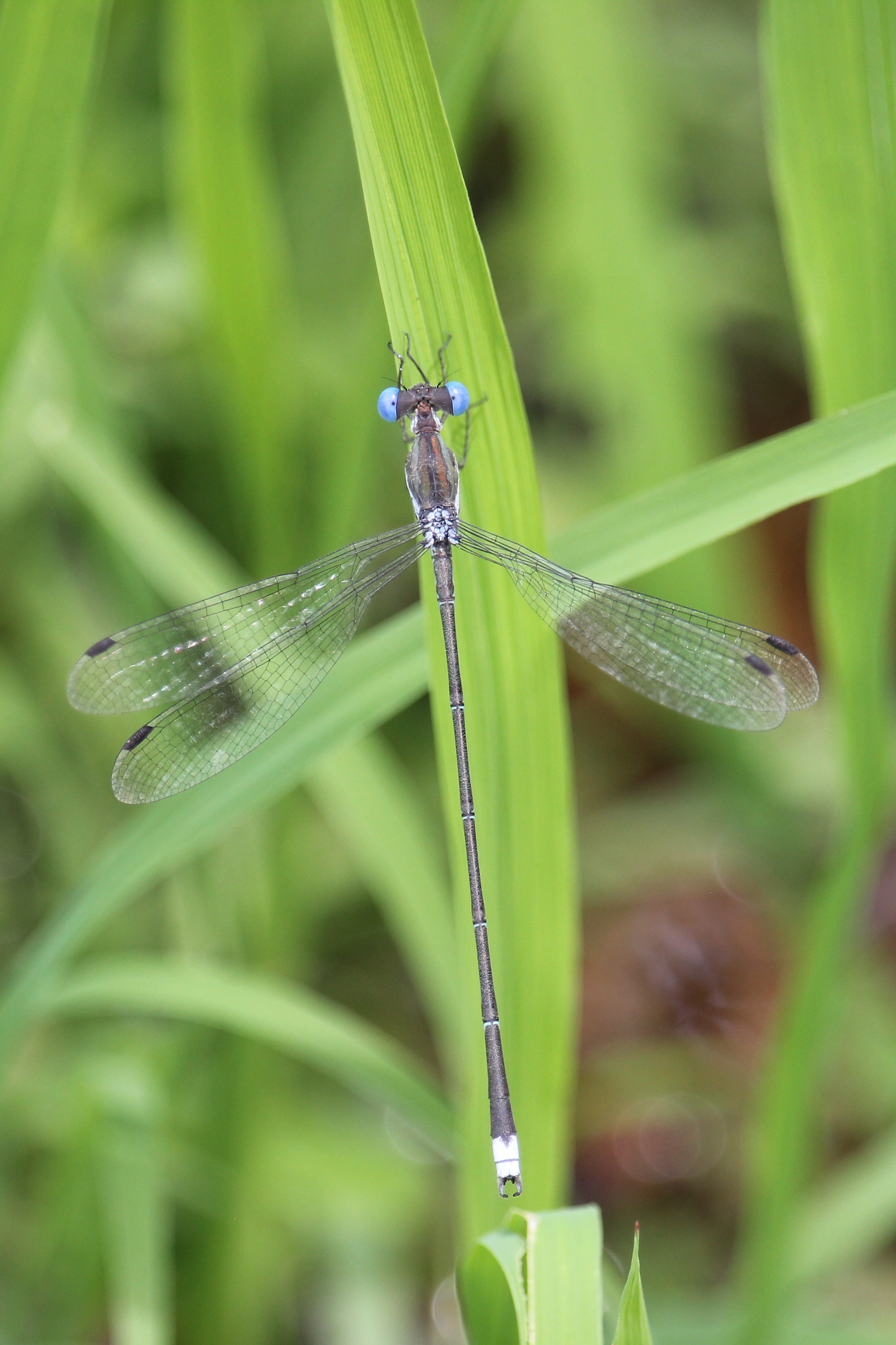
Male

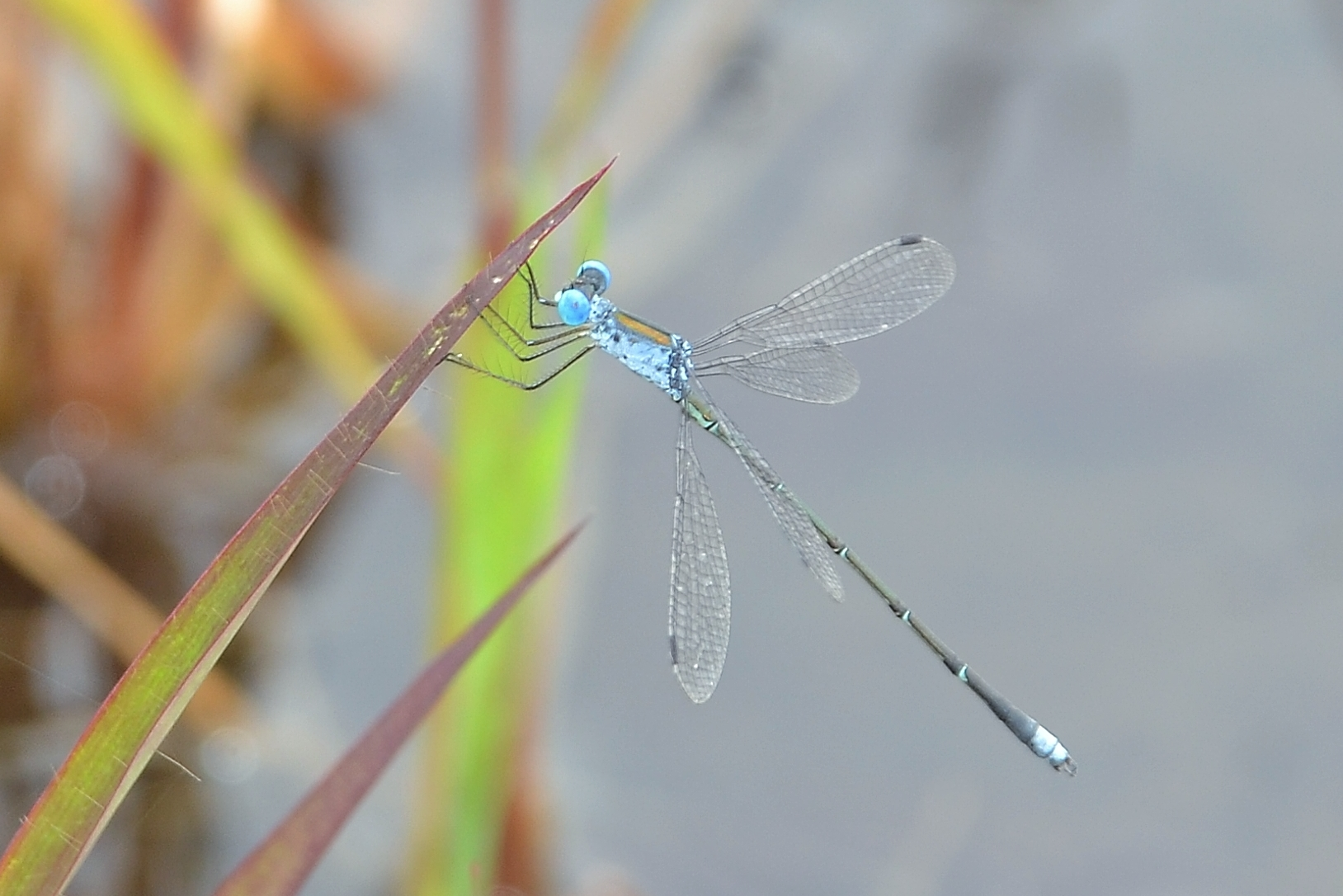
Male

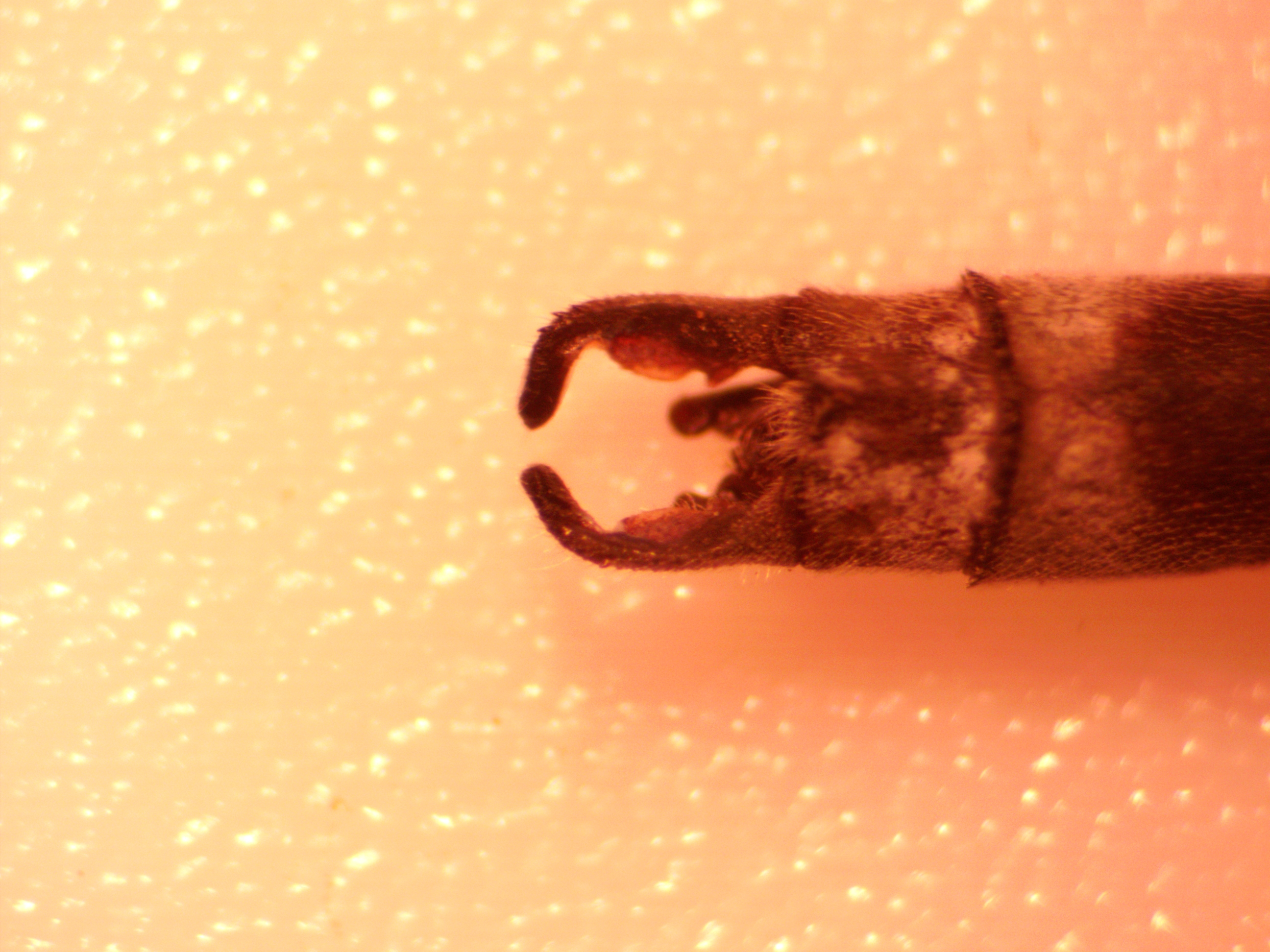
Appendages

===== Species: Lestes nodalis =====
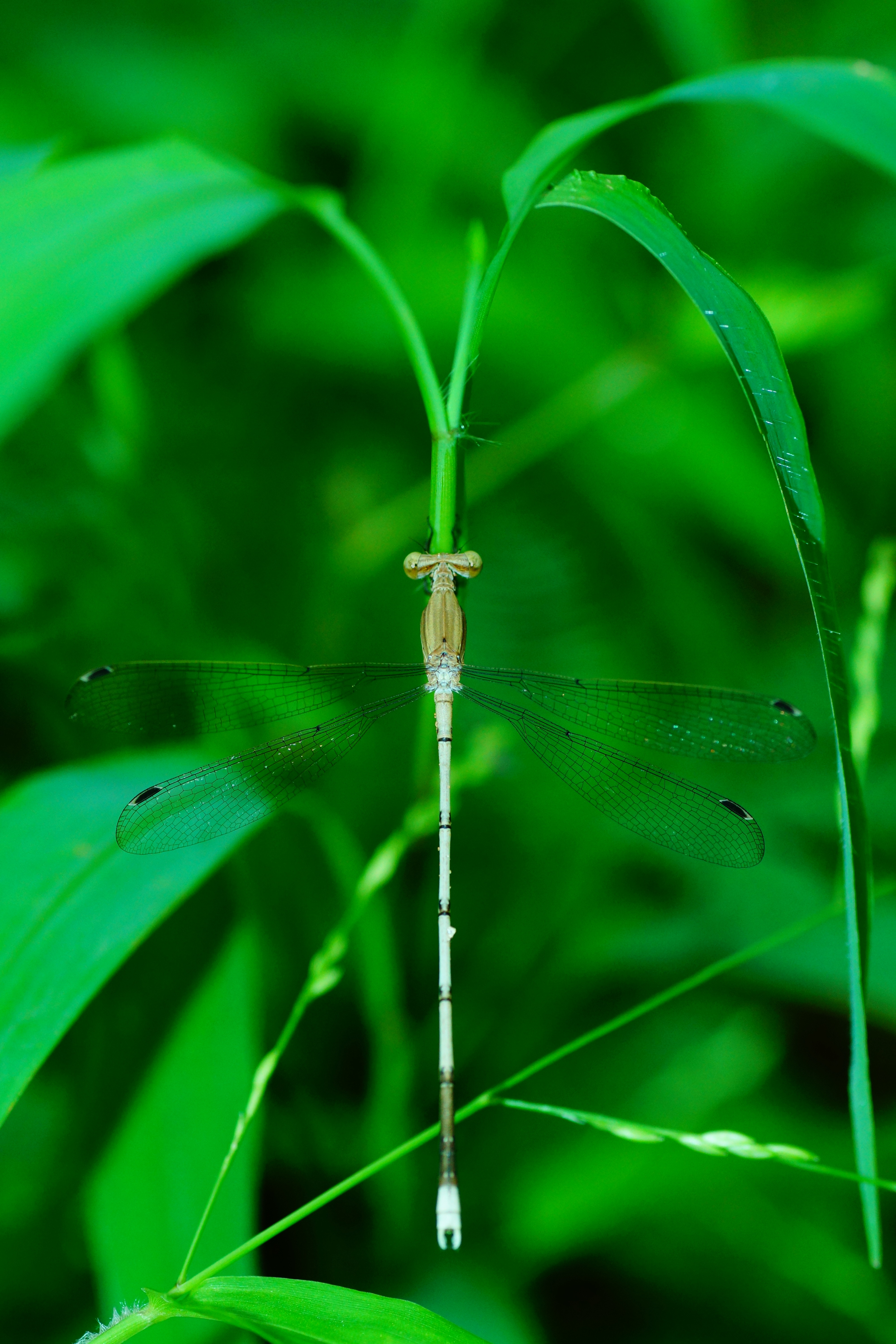
Lestes nodalis male

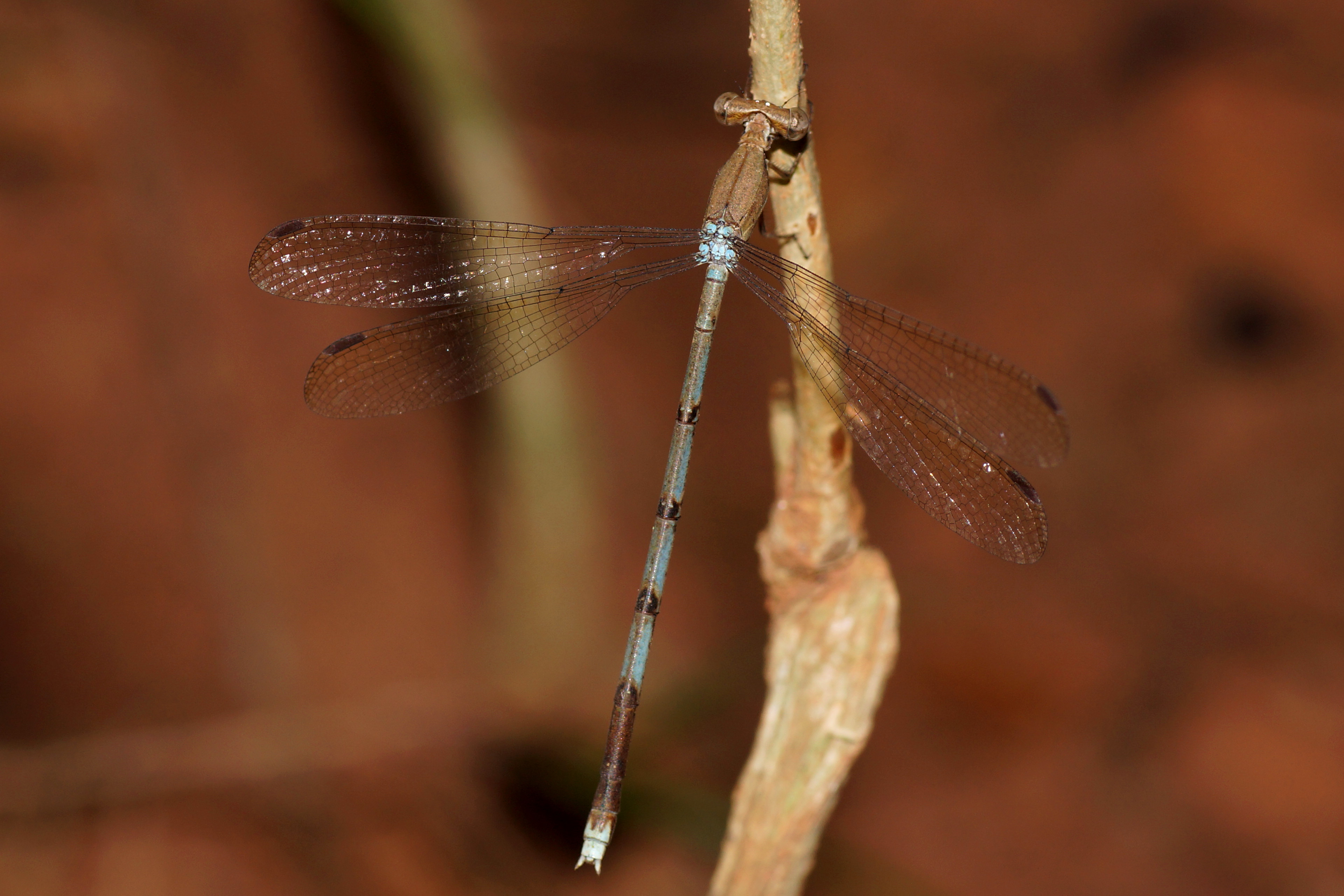
Lestes nodalis female

===== Species: Lestes patricia =====
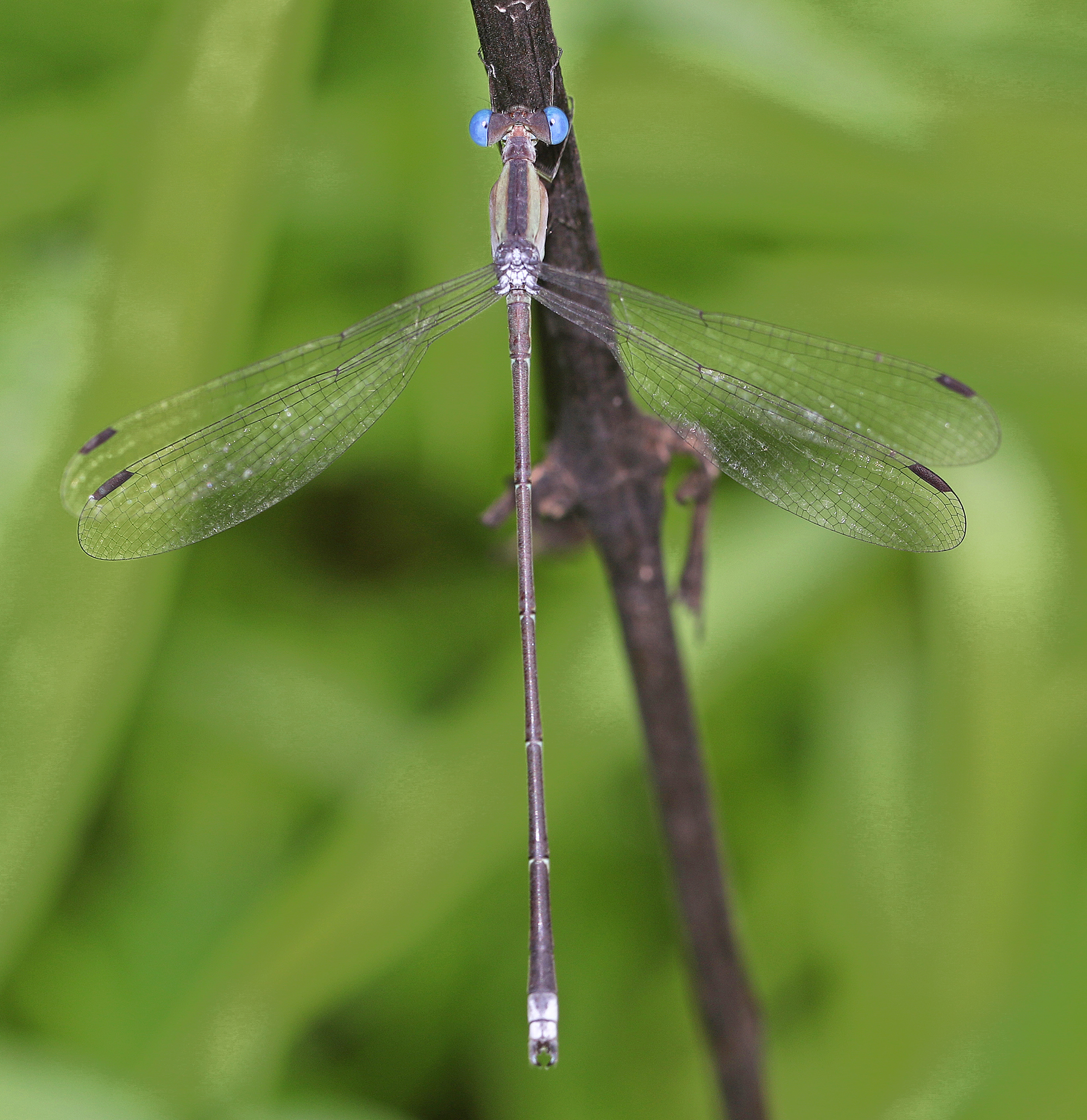
Male (dorsal view)

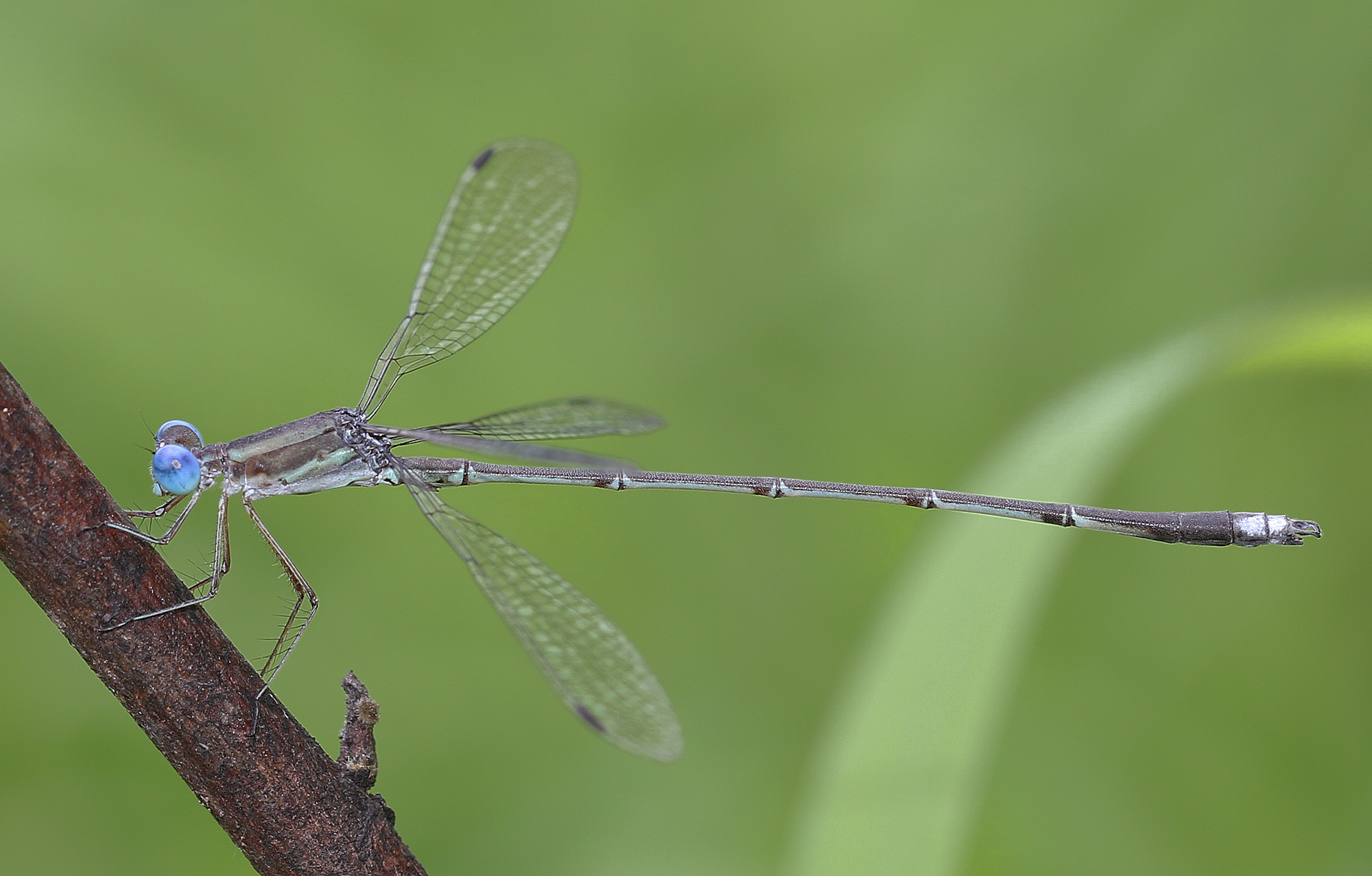
Male (lateral view)

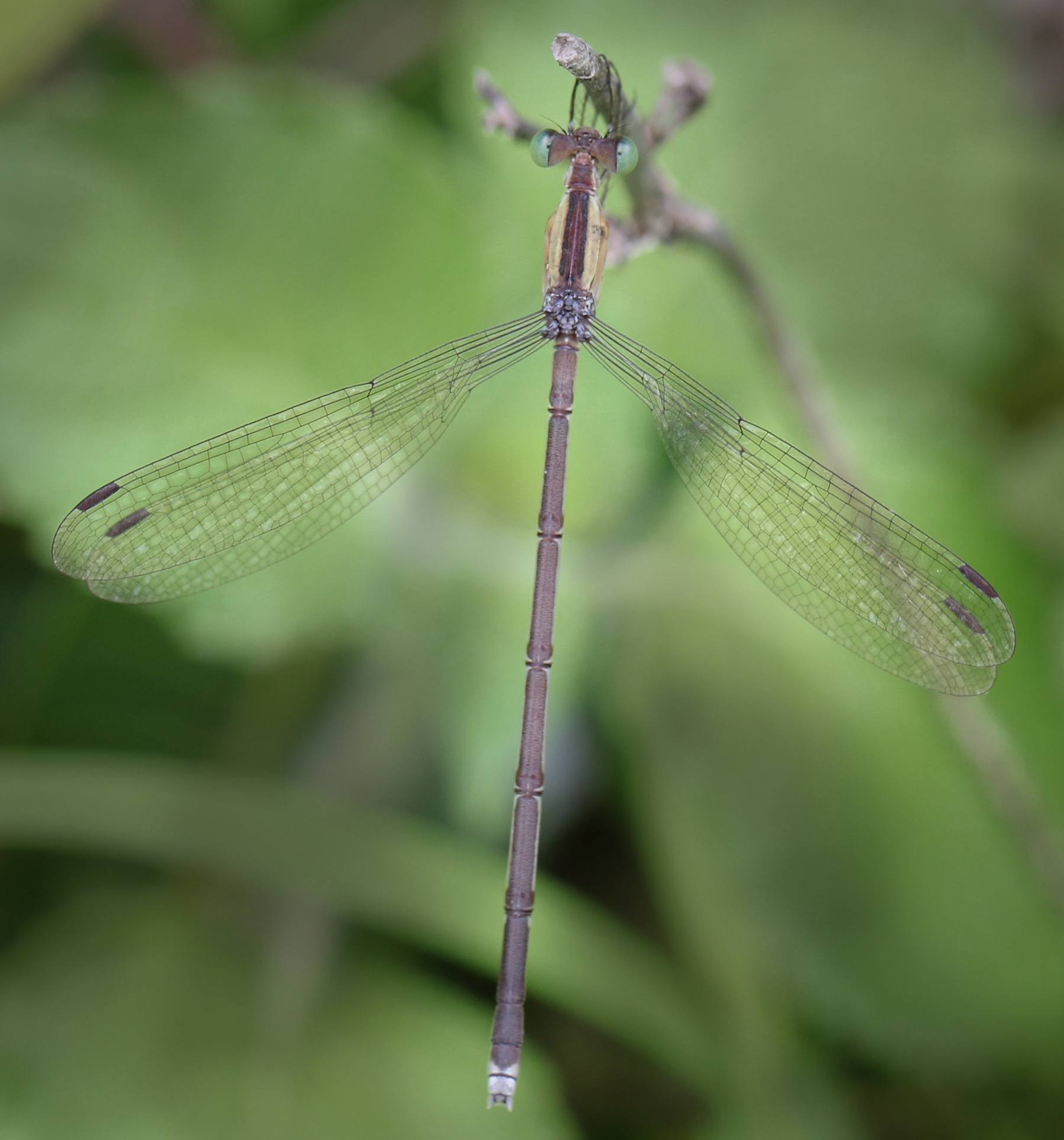
Female (dorsal view)

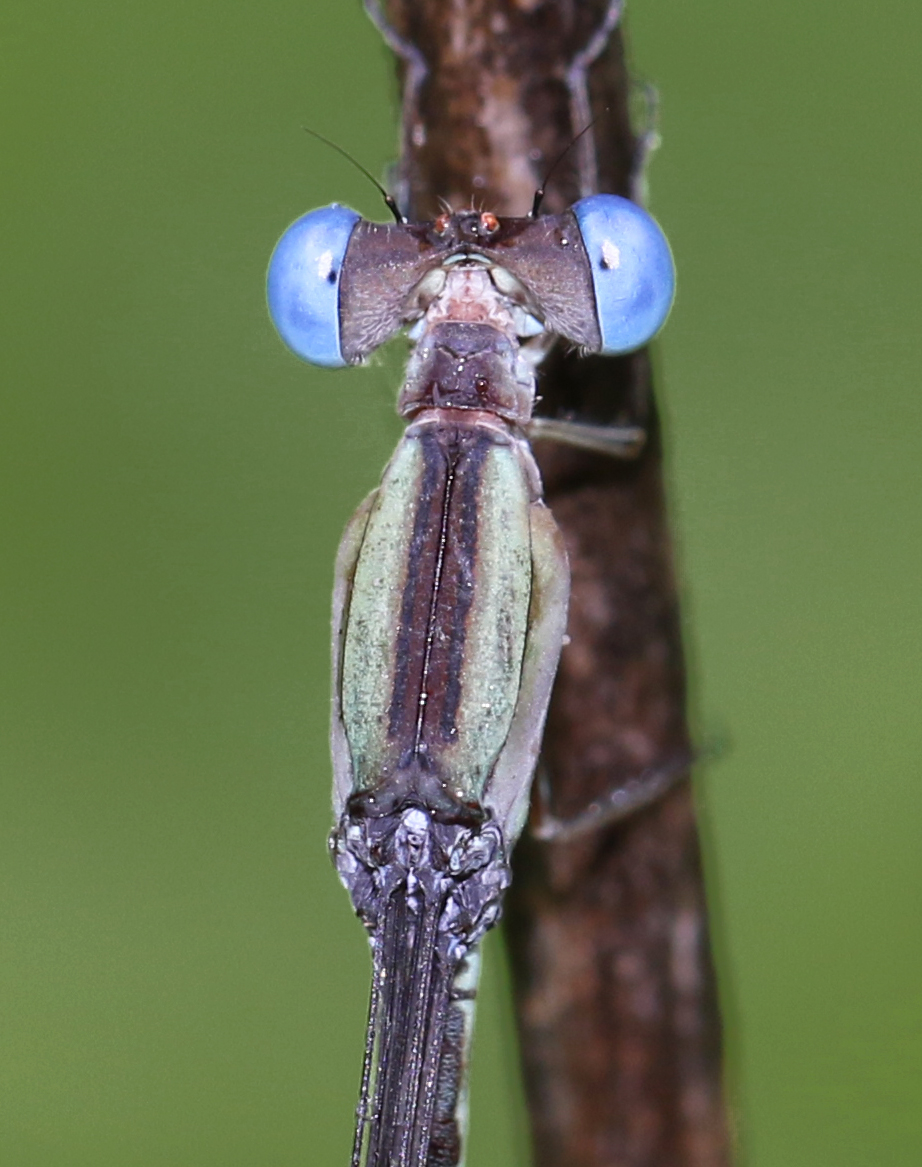
Male (marks on thorax)

===== Species: Lestes praemorsus =====
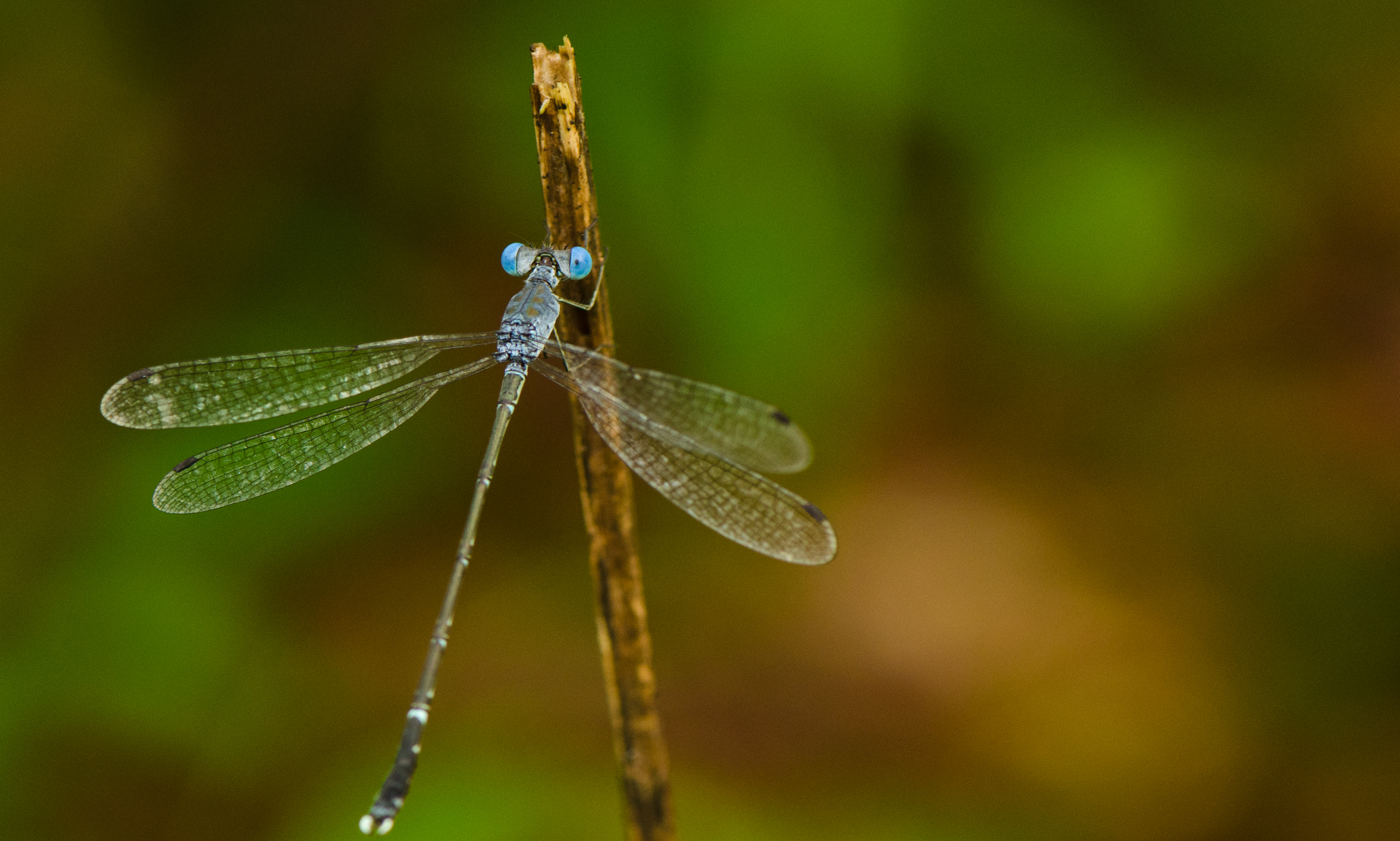
Lestes praemorsus male

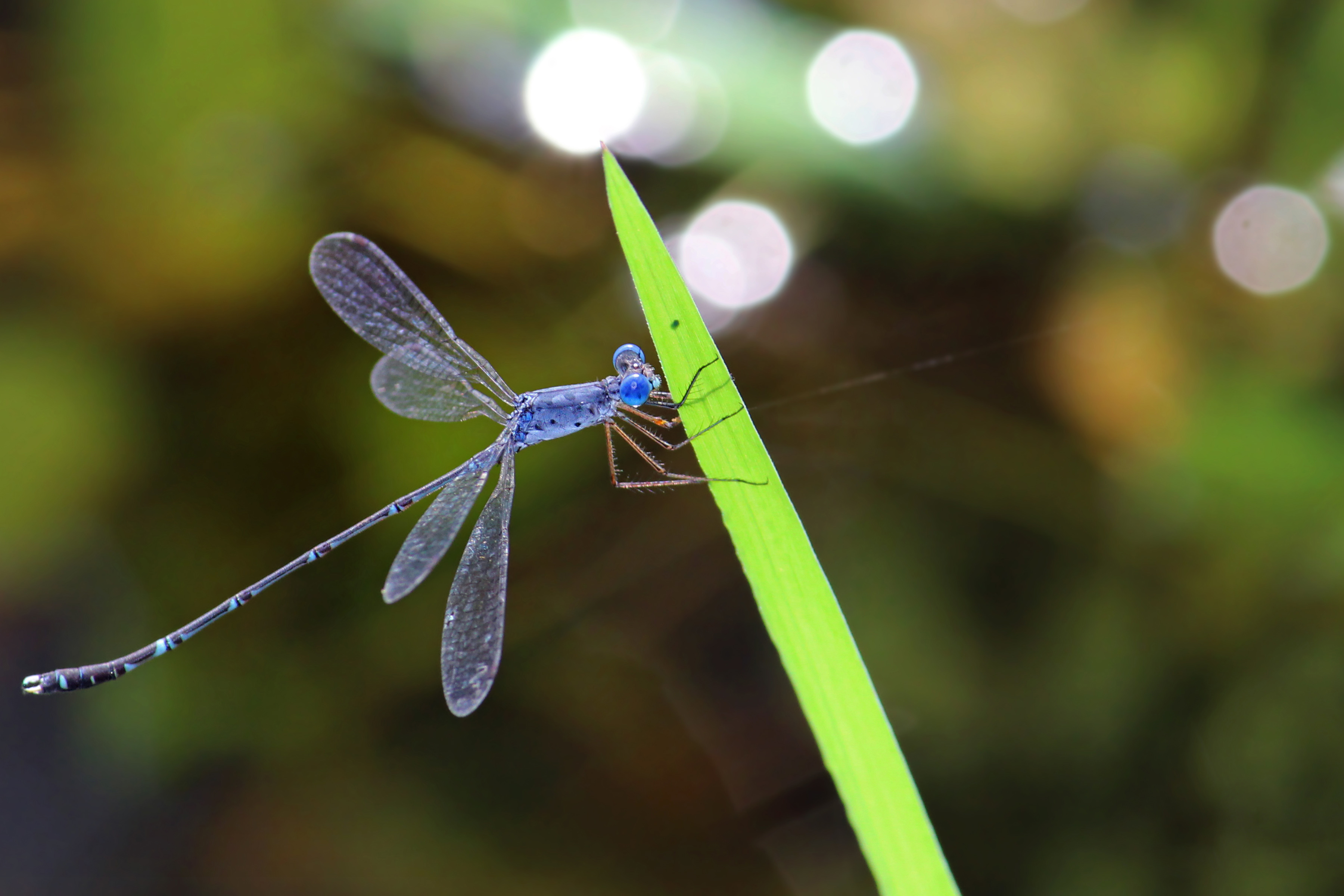
Lestes praemorsus male

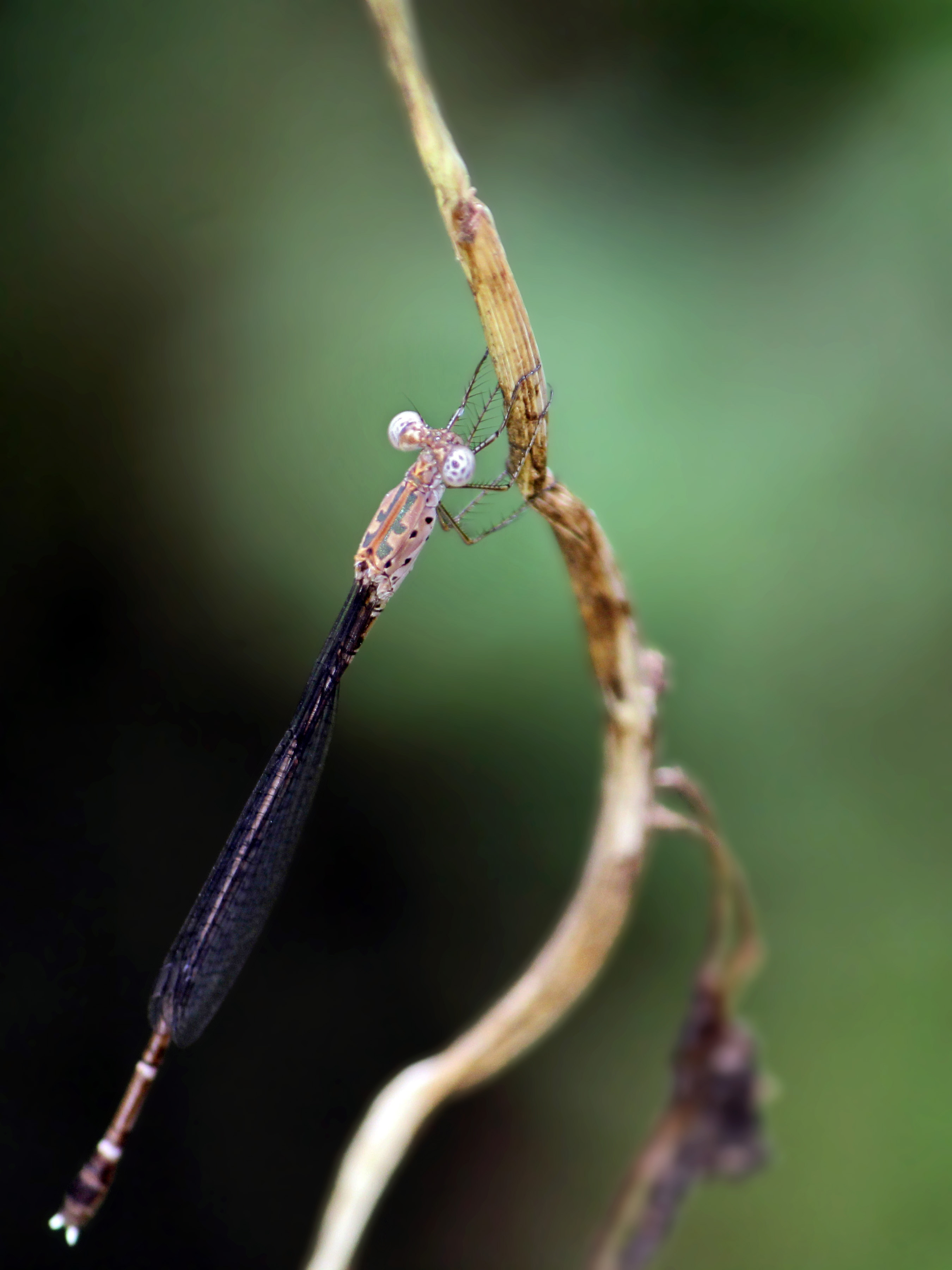
female

==== Genus: Platylestes ====
===== Species: Platylestes kirani =====
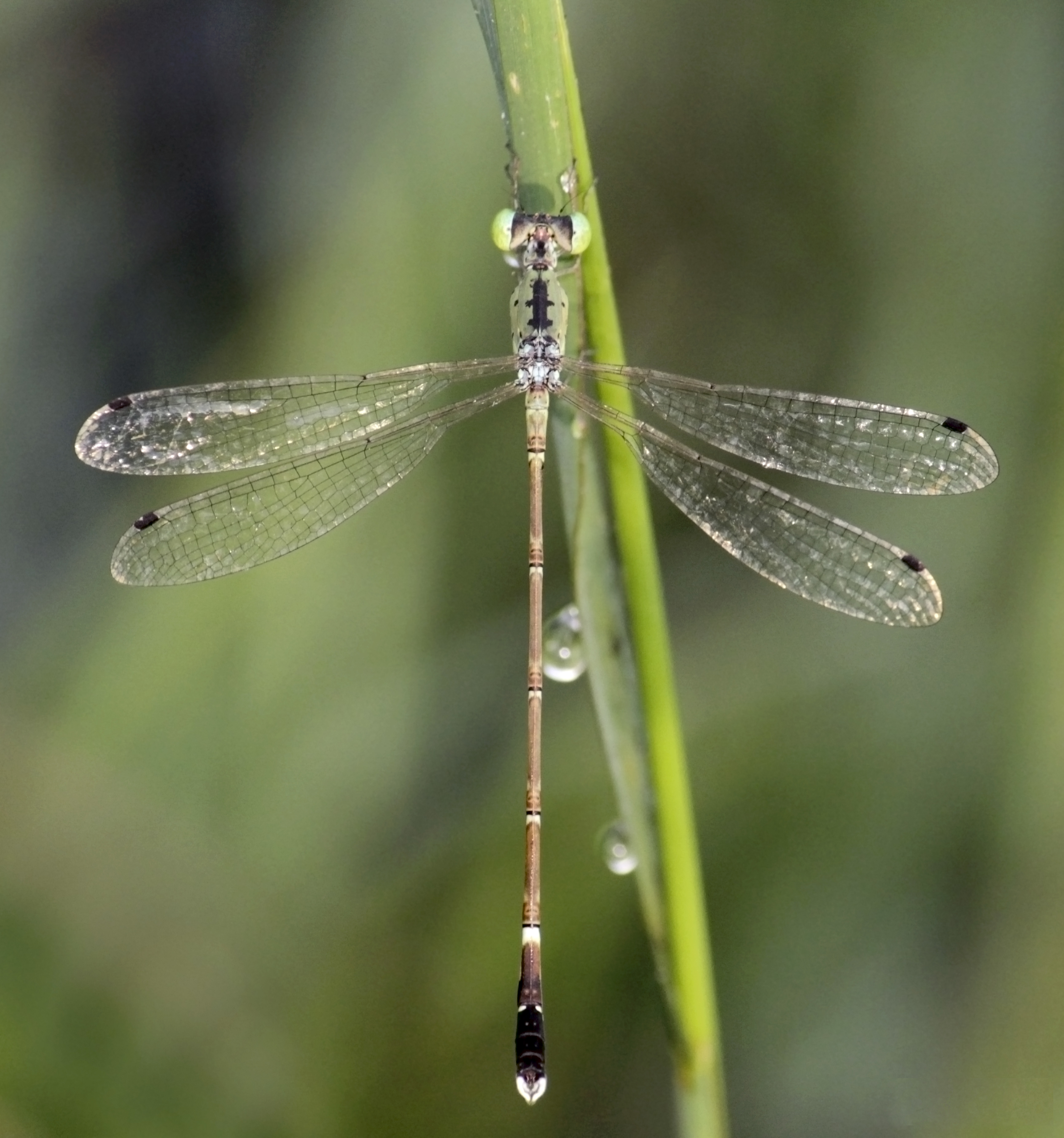
male

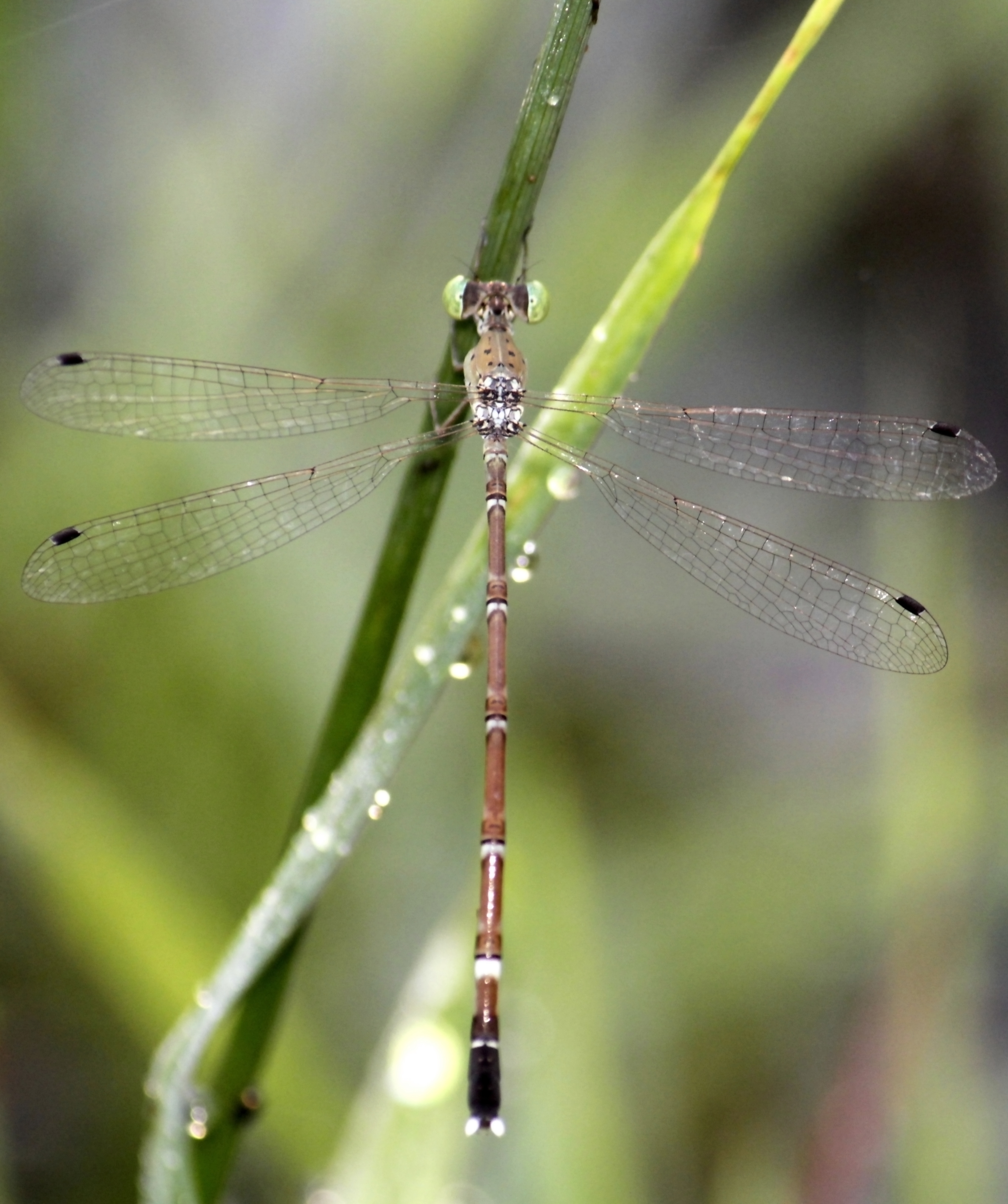
female

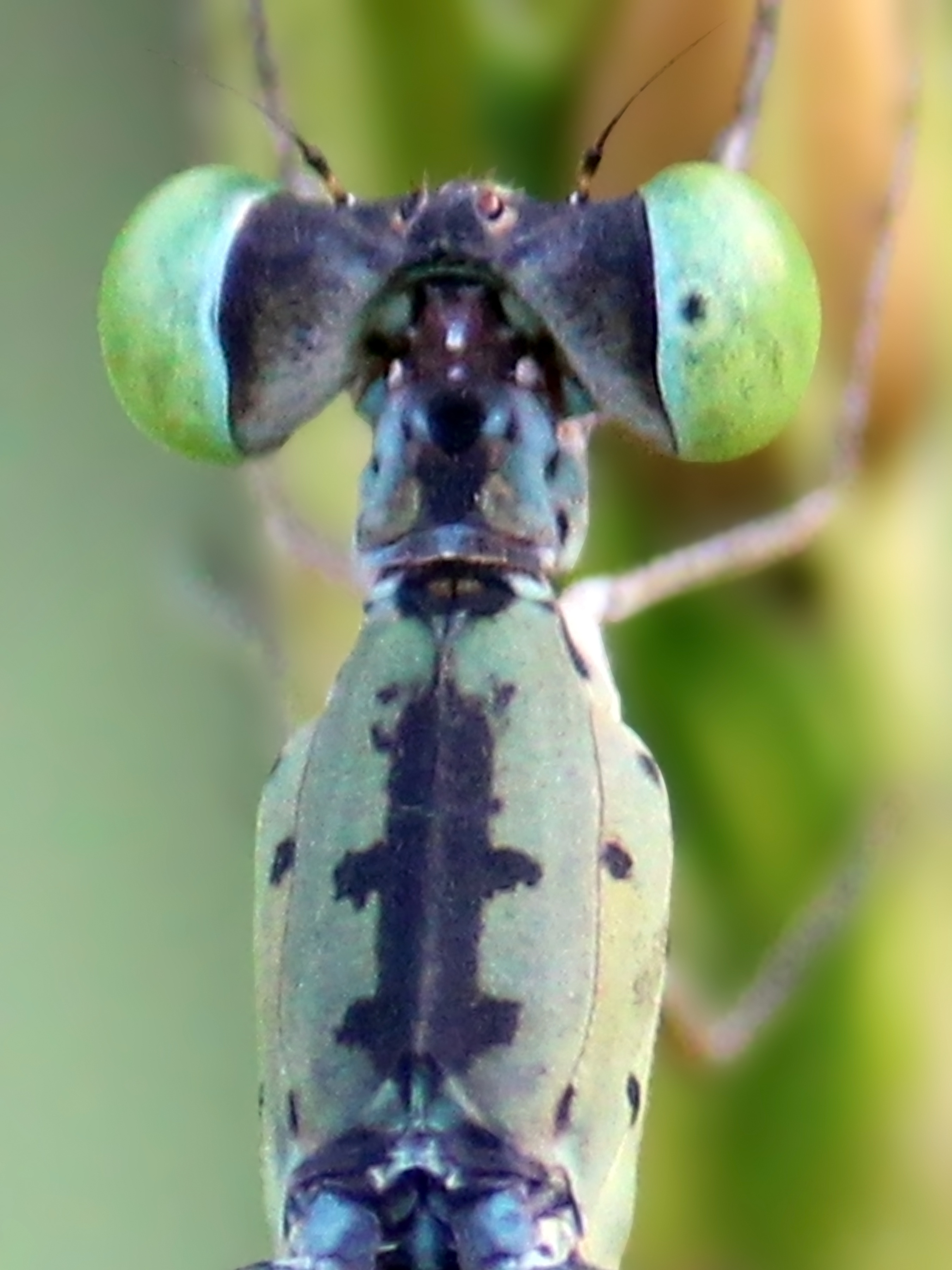
Black marks on thorax

===== Species: Platylestes platystylus =====
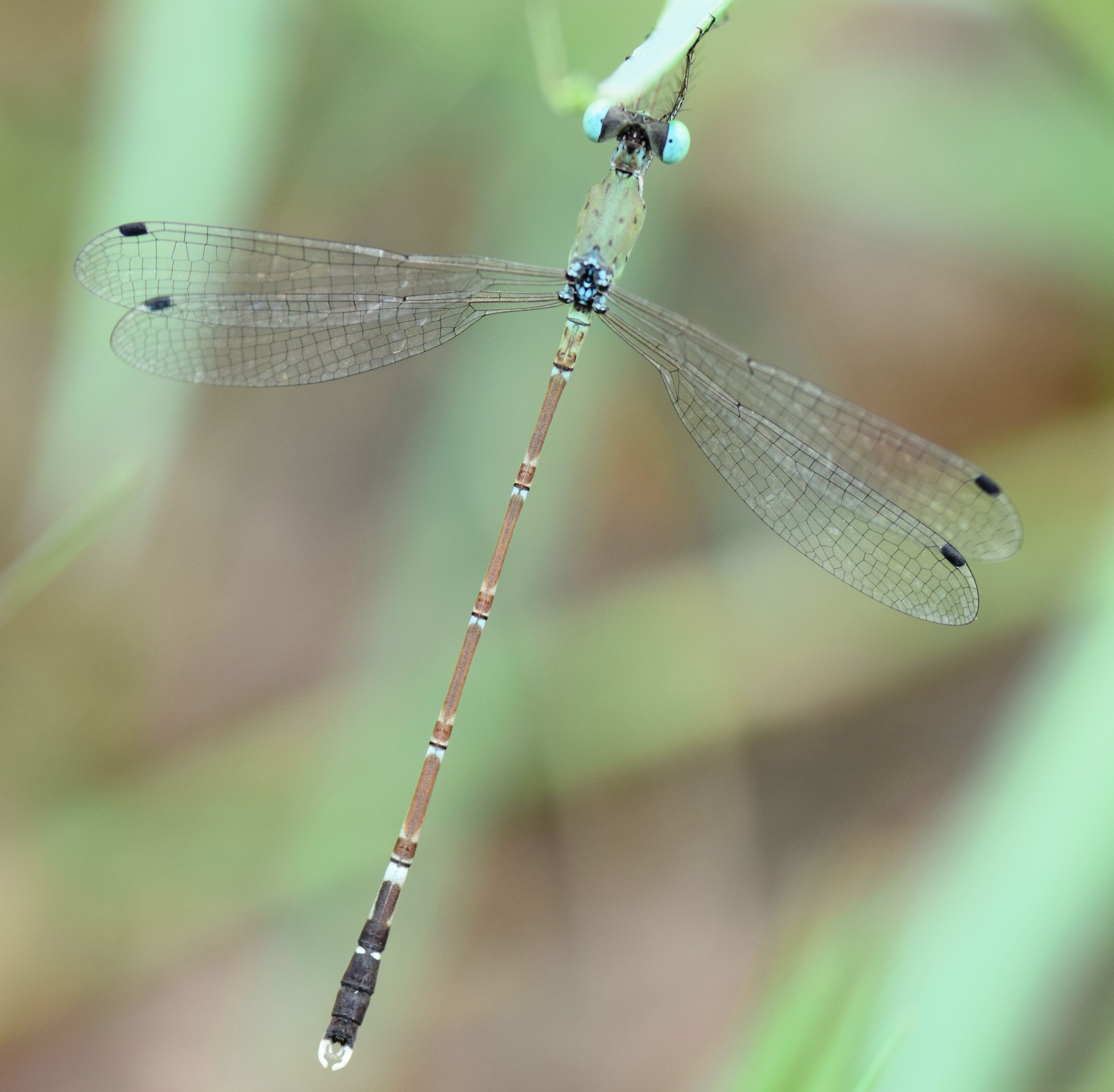
Platylestes platystylus male

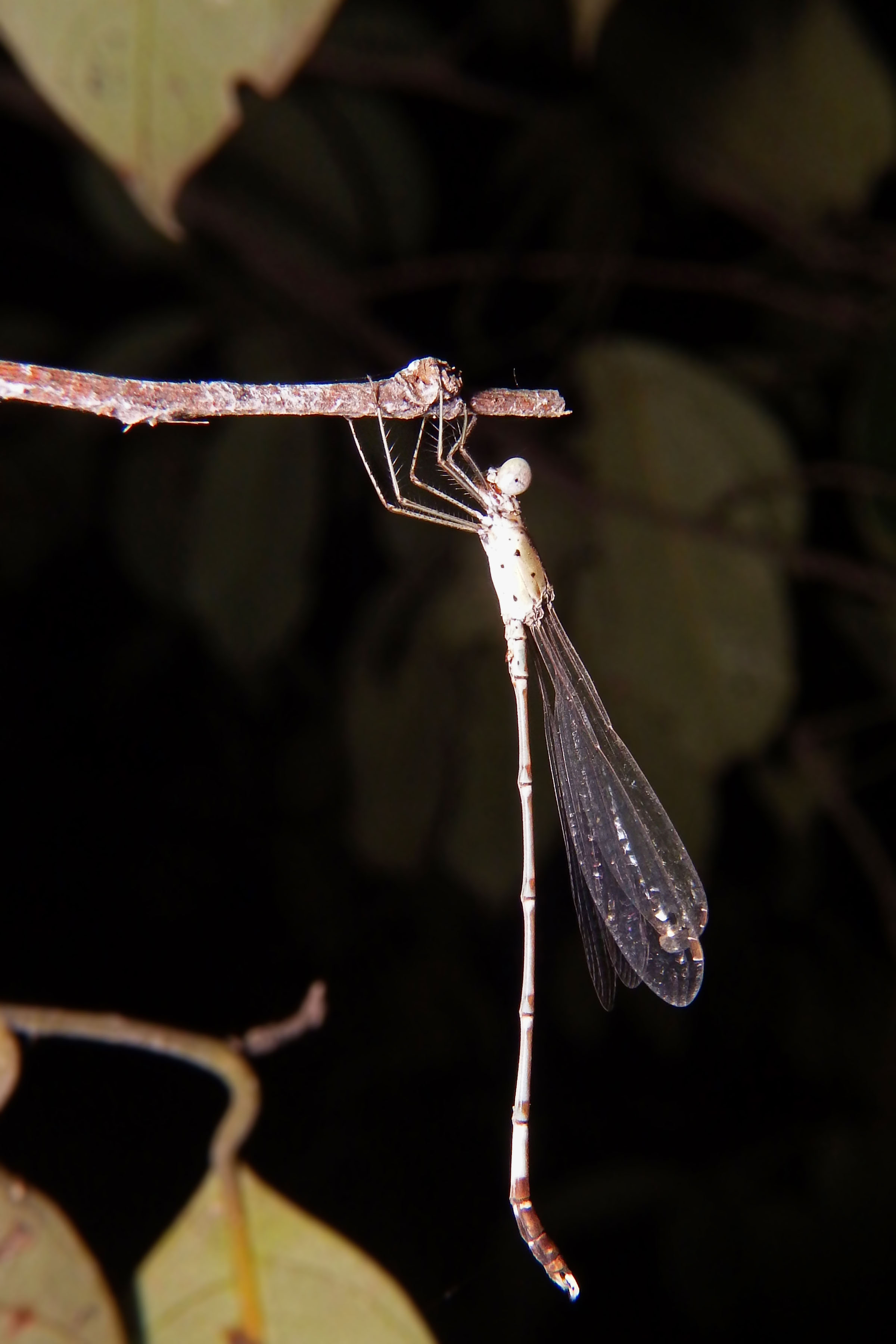
Platylestes platystylus young male

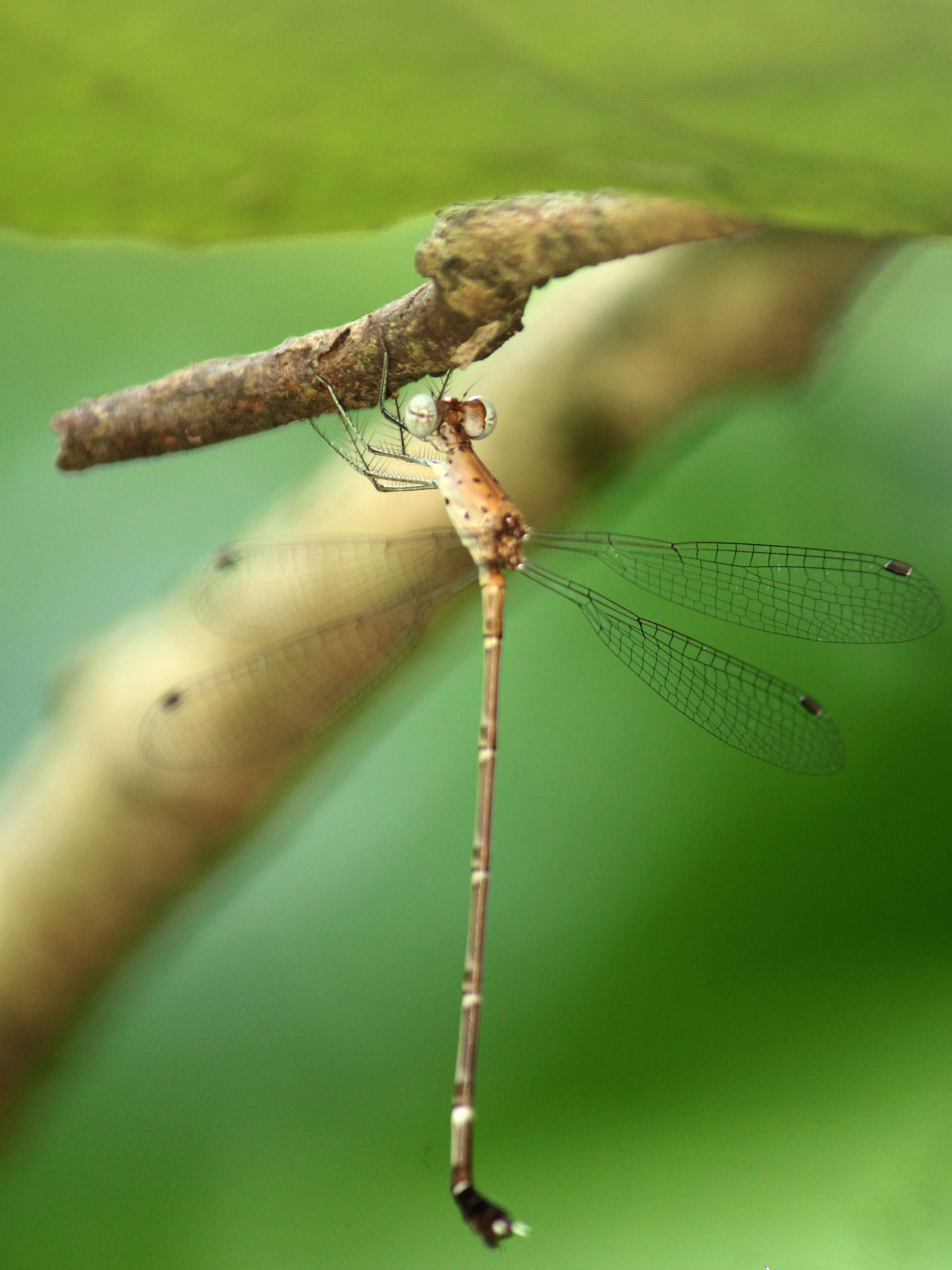
Platylestes platystylus female

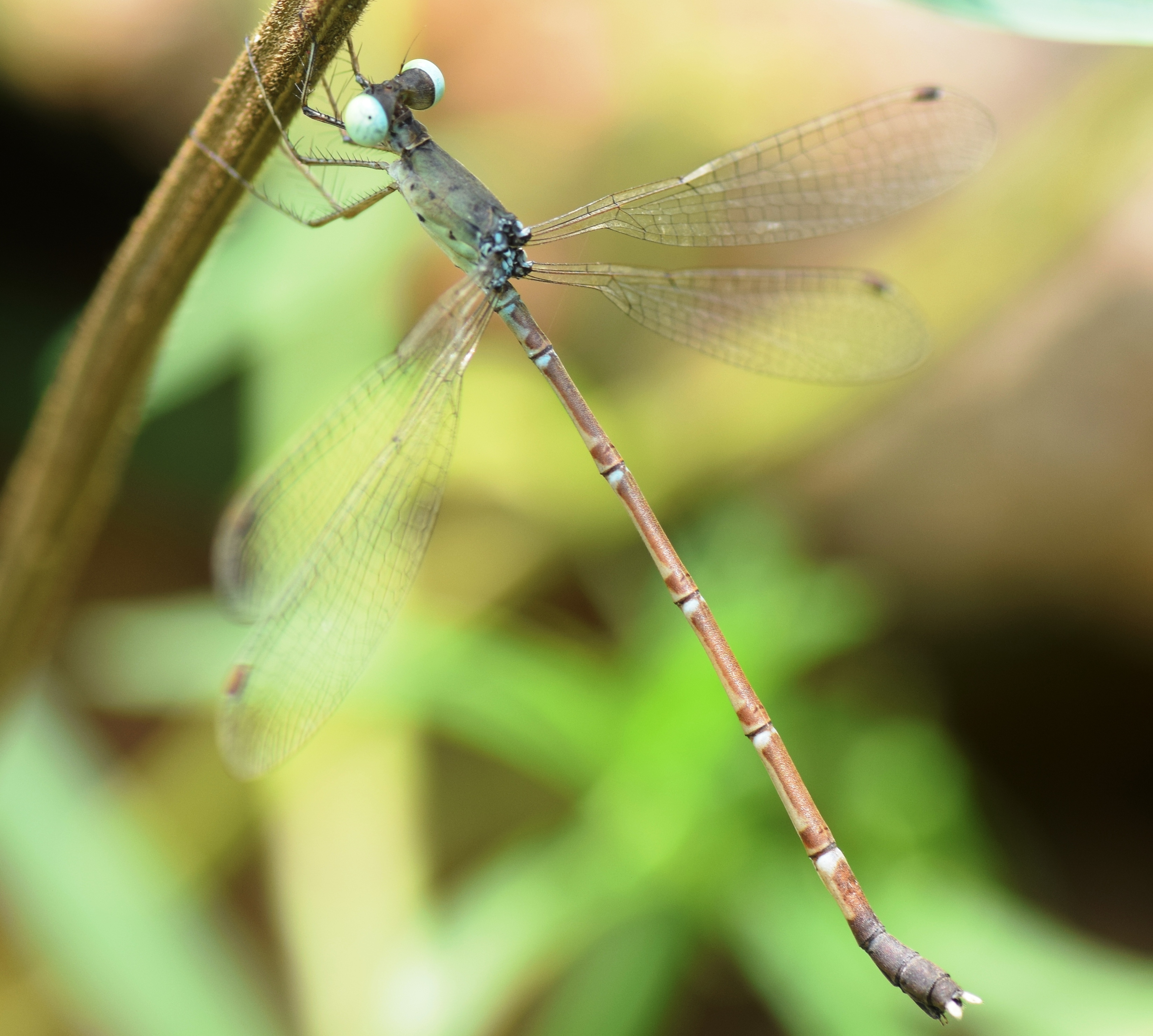
Platylestes platystylus female

=== Family: Platystictidae (Shadow damselflies) ===
==== Genus: Indosticta ====
===== Species: Indosticta deccanensis =====
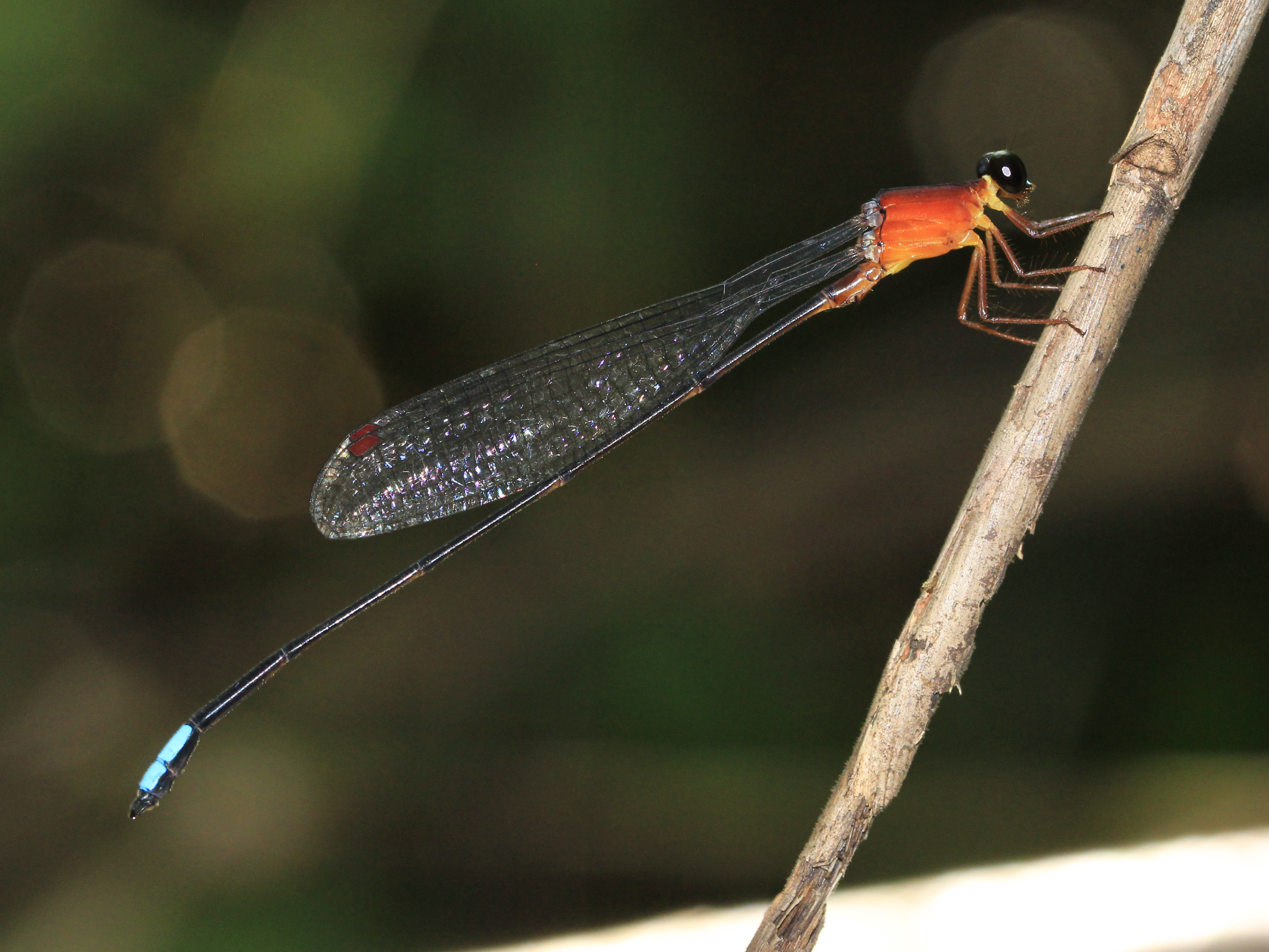
male

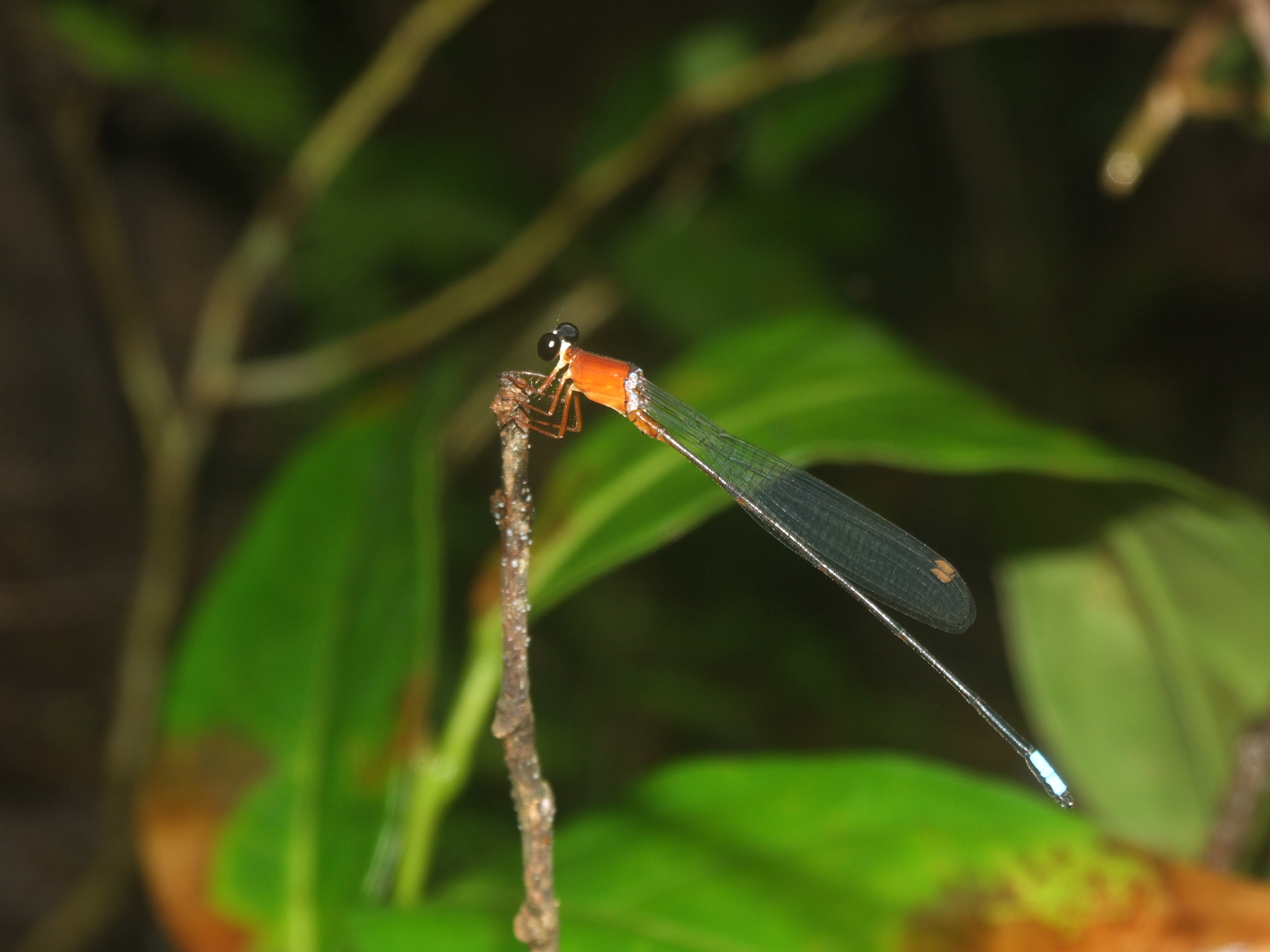
Indosticta deccanensis male

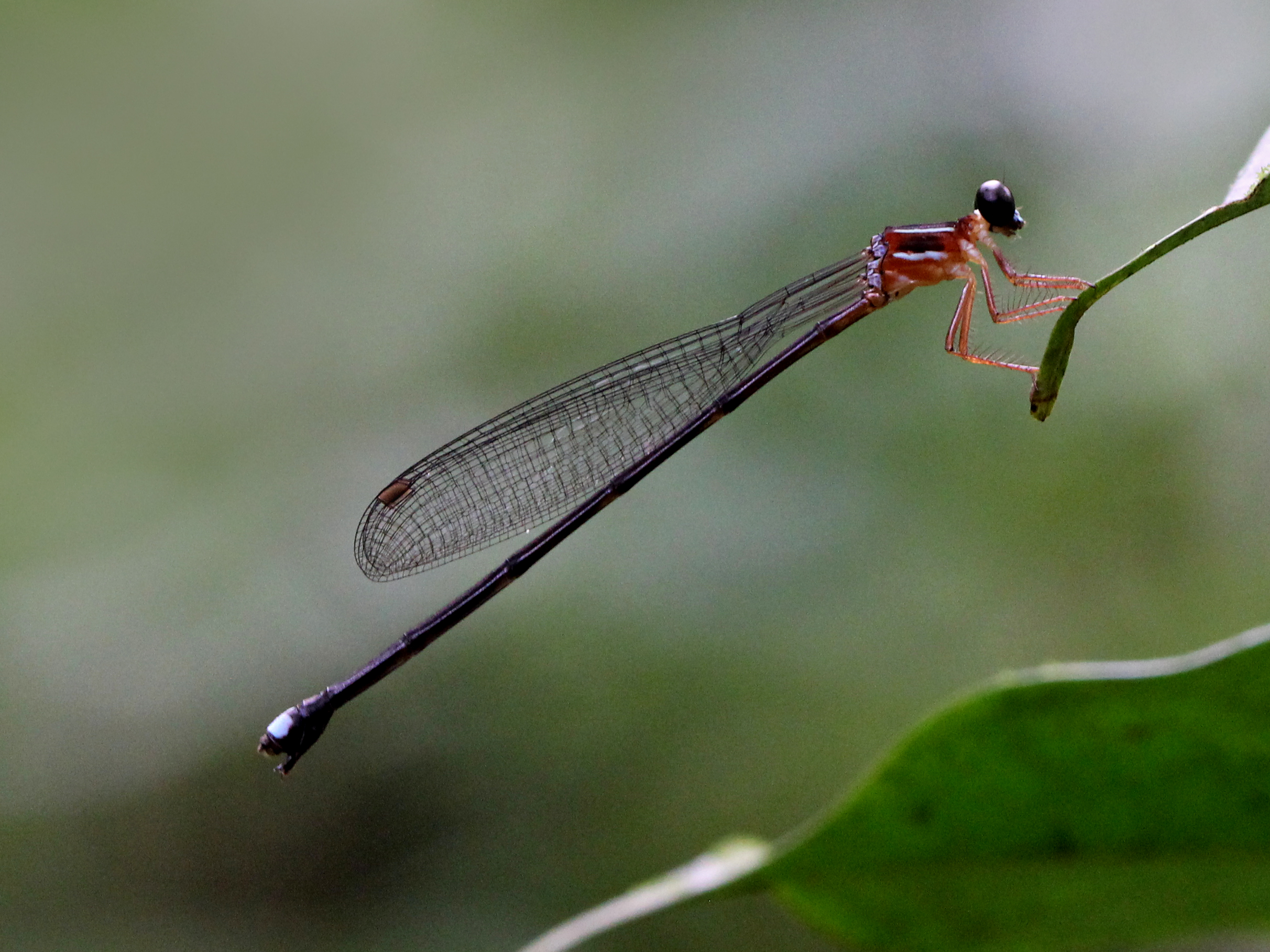
Indosticta deccanensis female

==== Genus: Protosticta ====
===== Species: Protosticta armageddonia =====
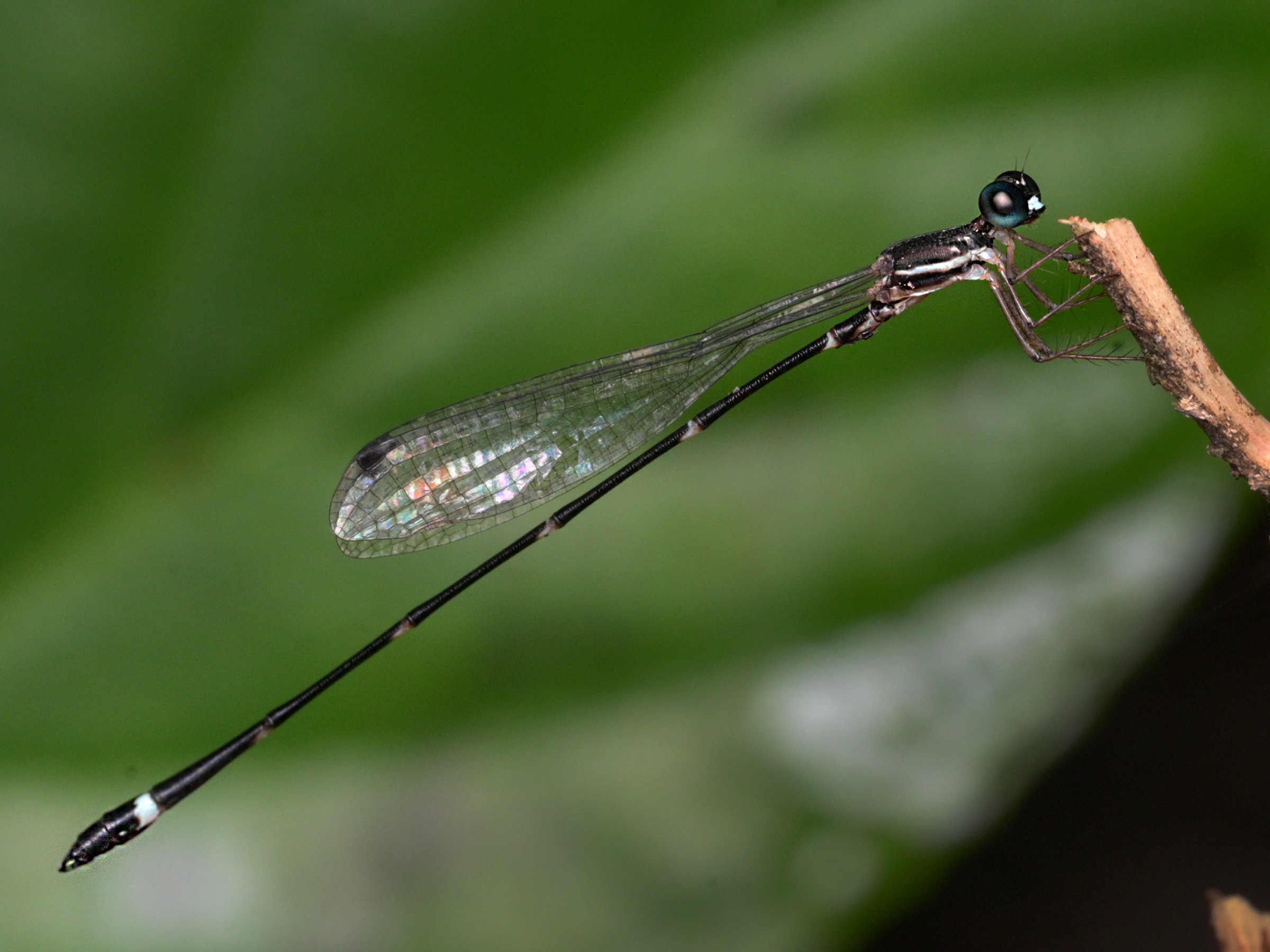

===== Species: Protosticta cyanofemora =====
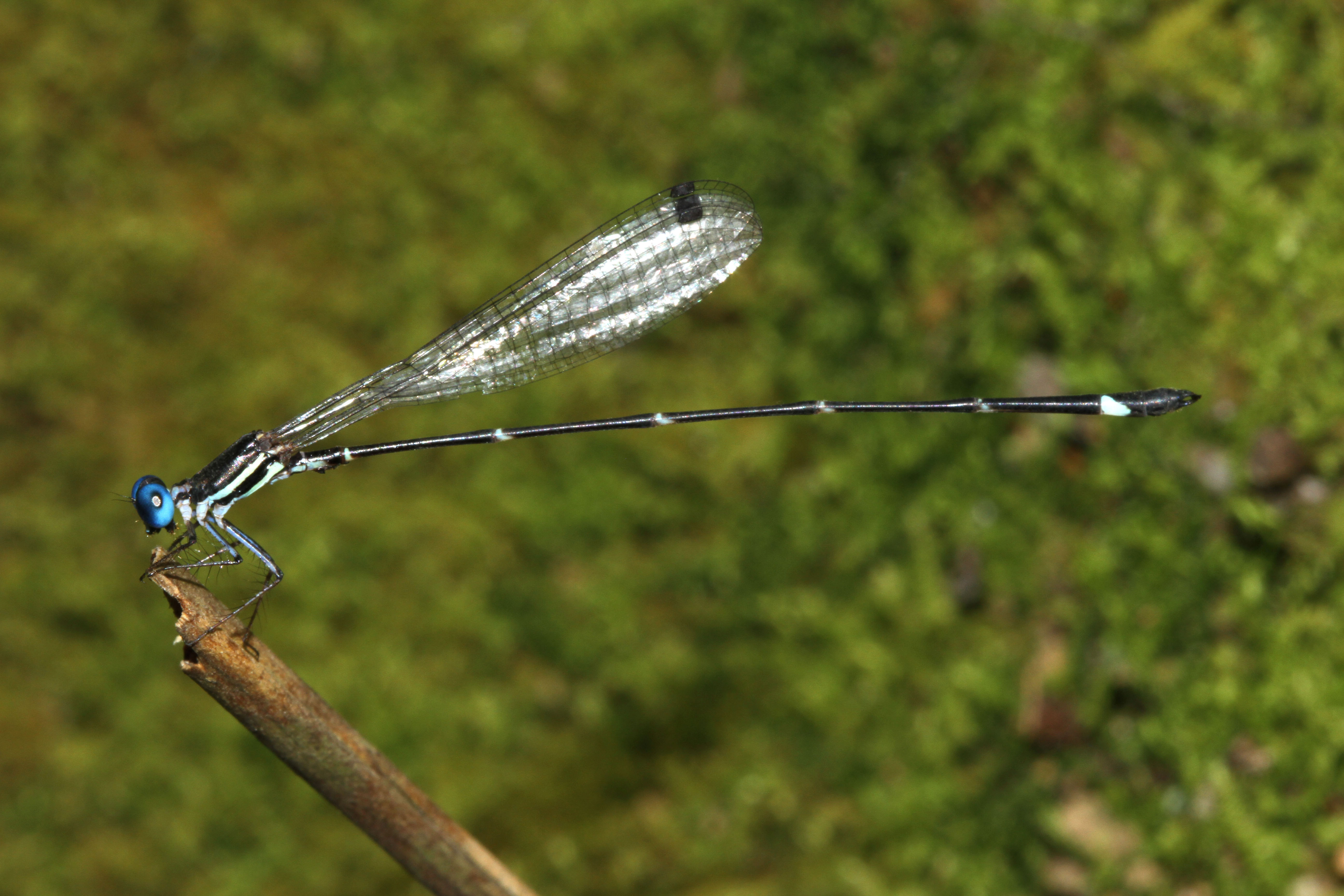
Male

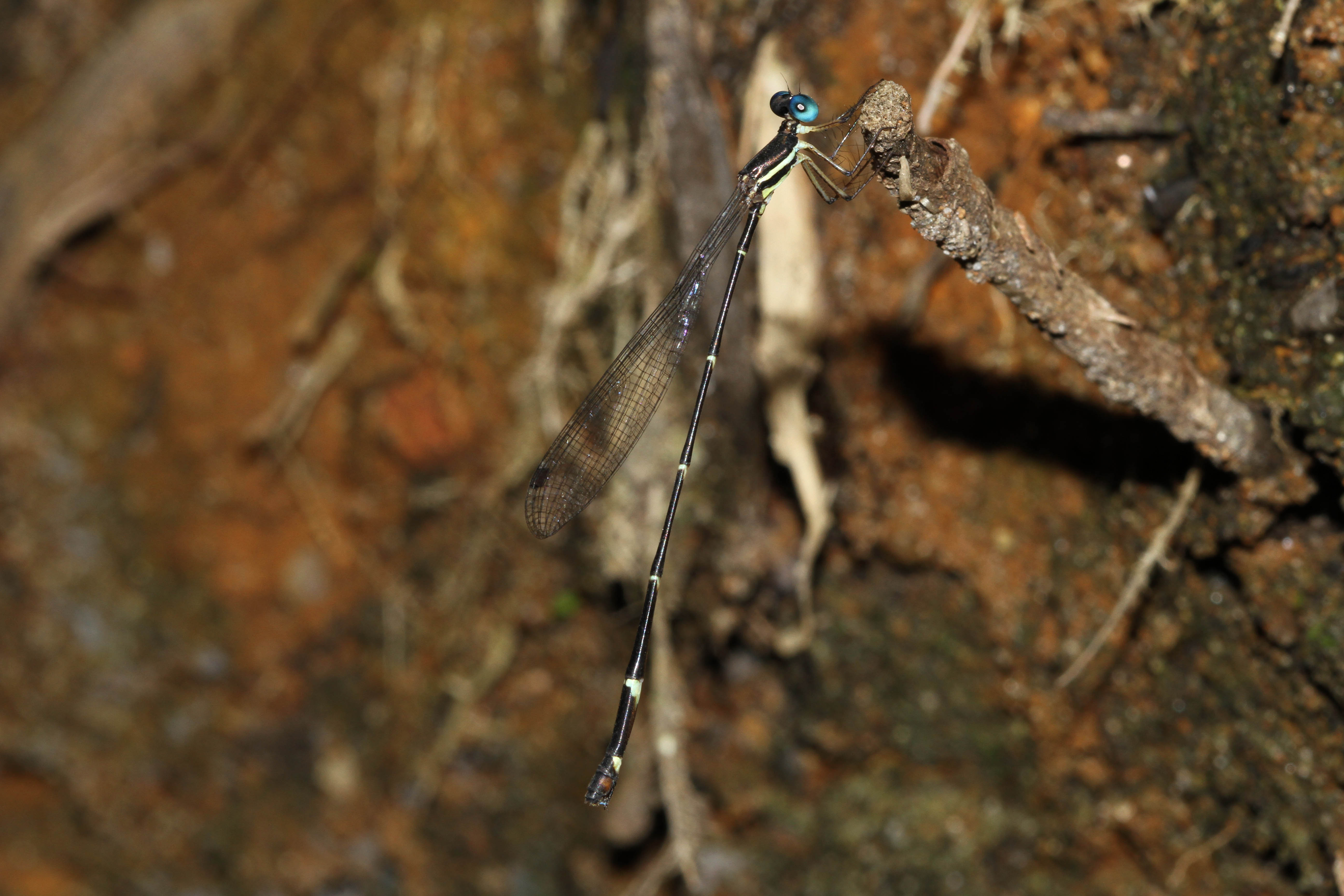
Female

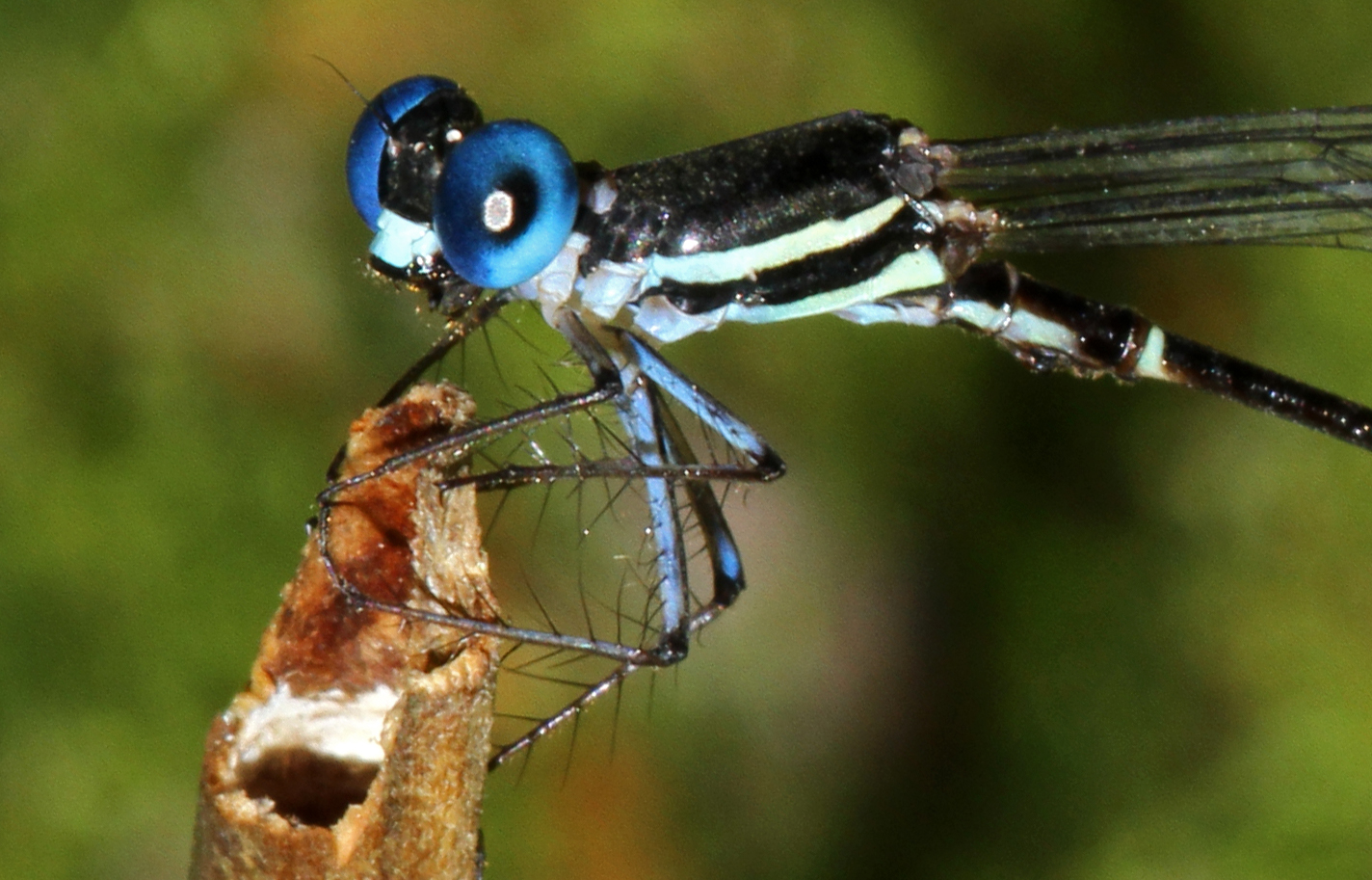
Head

===== Species: Protosticta davenporti =====
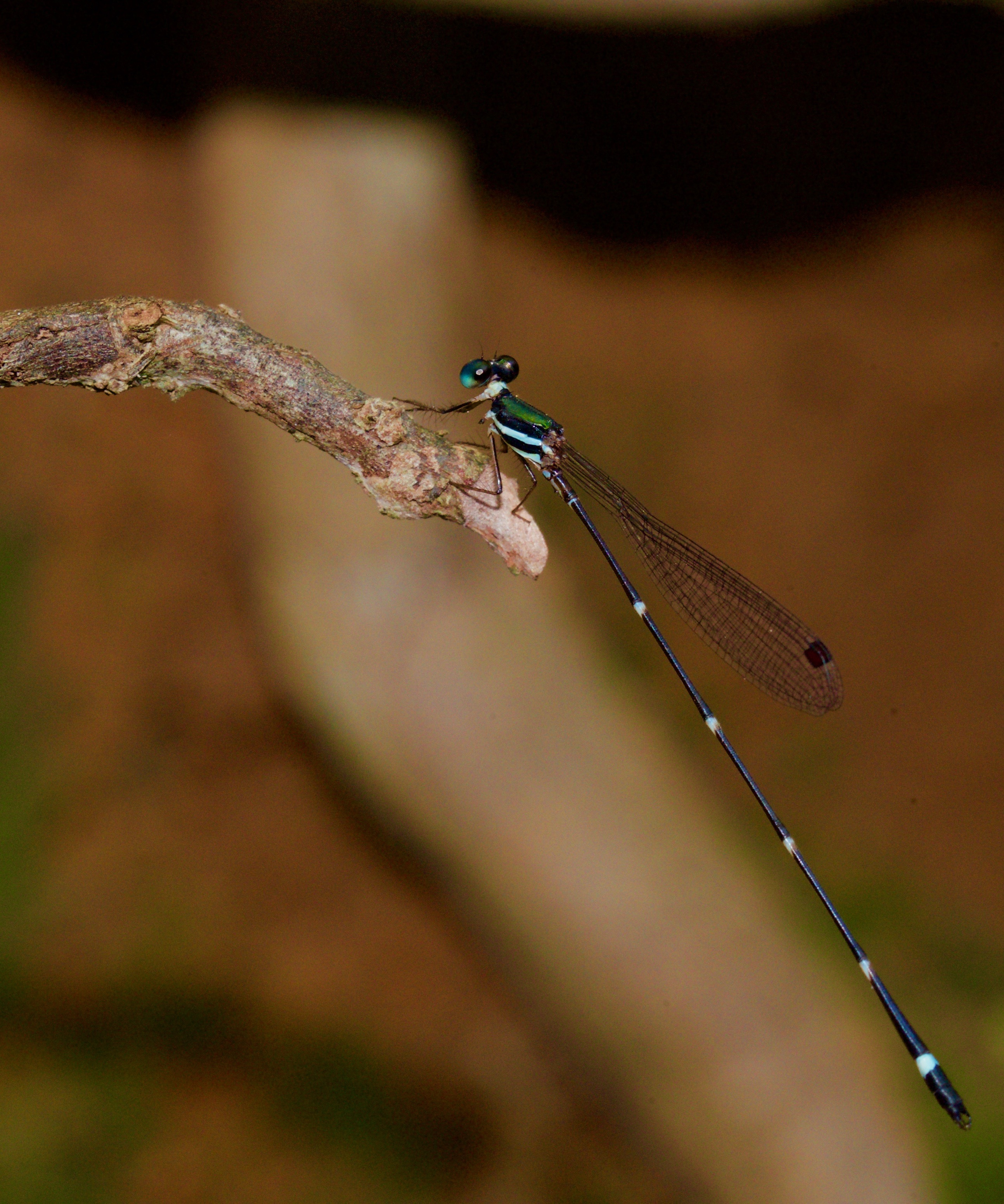
Male

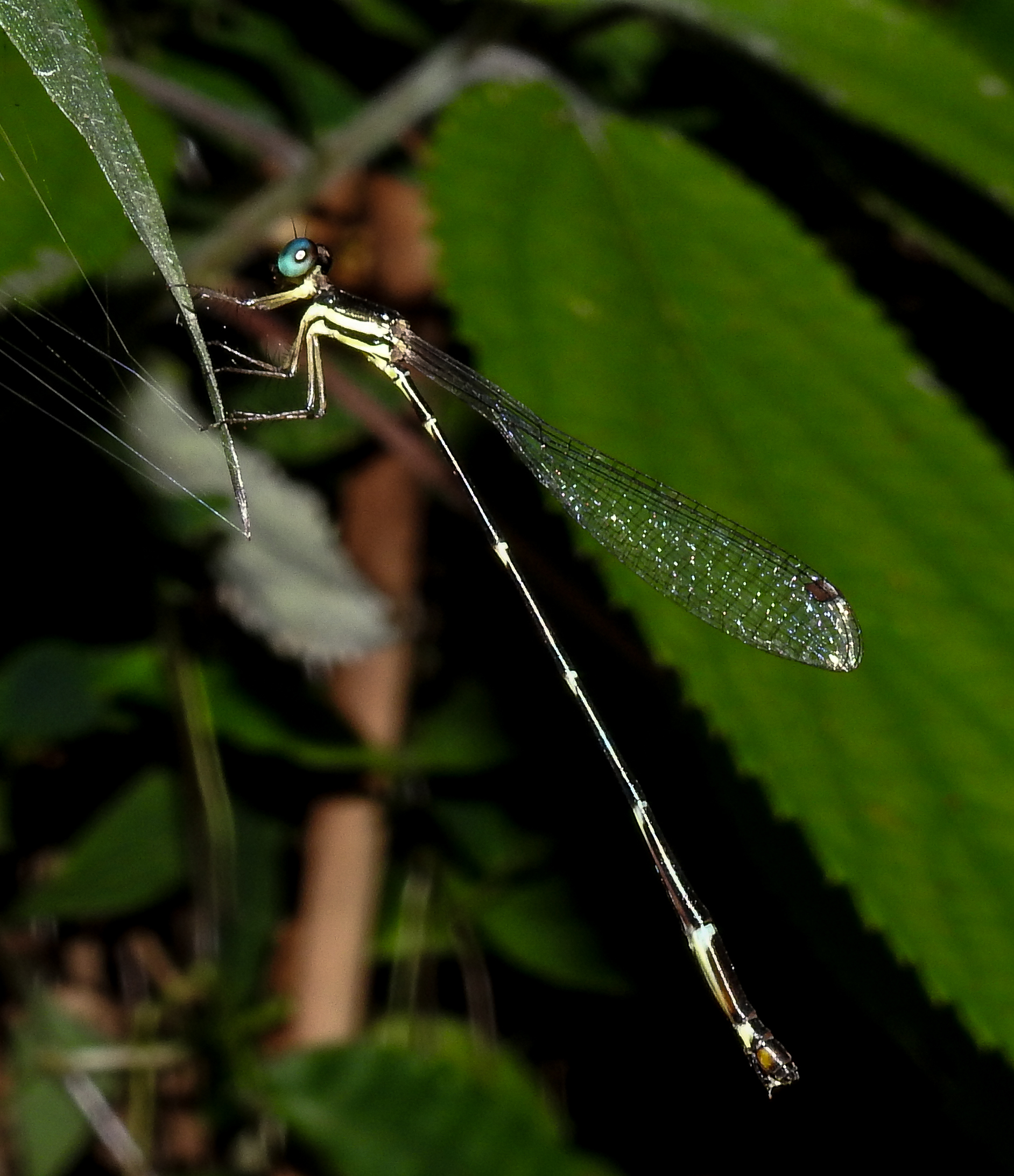
Female

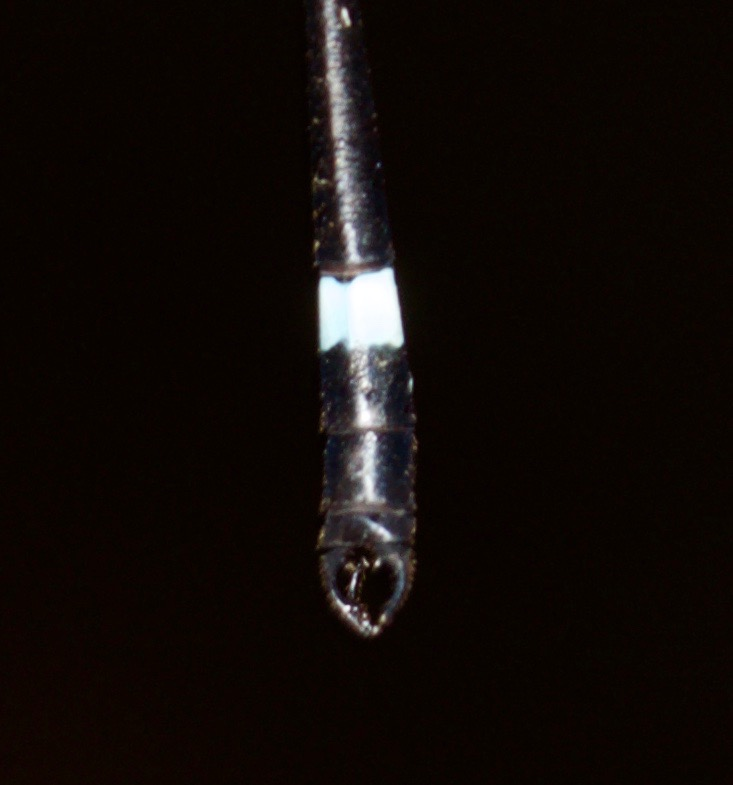
Anal appendages (male)

===== Species: Protosticta gravelyi =====
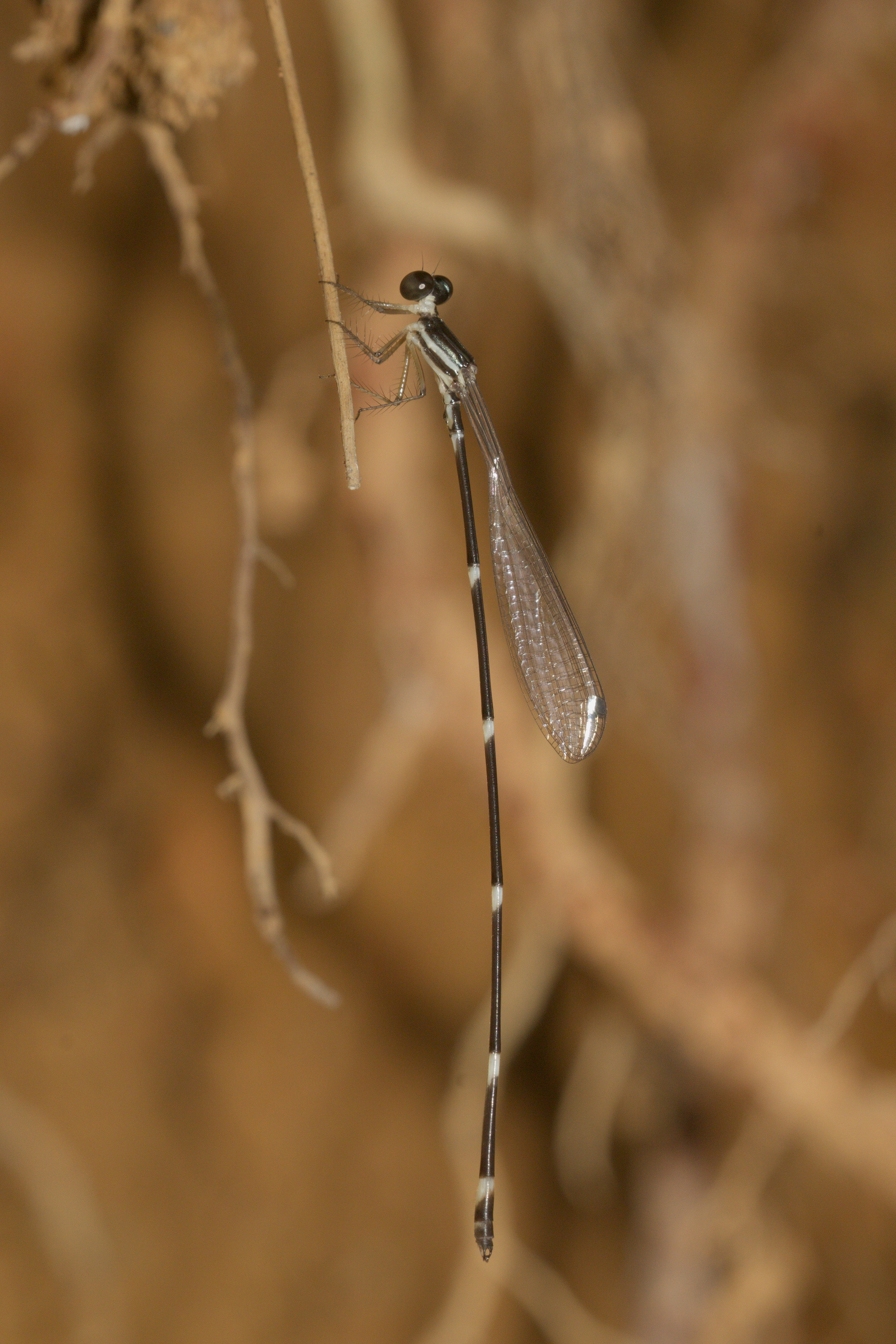
Protosticta gravelyi male

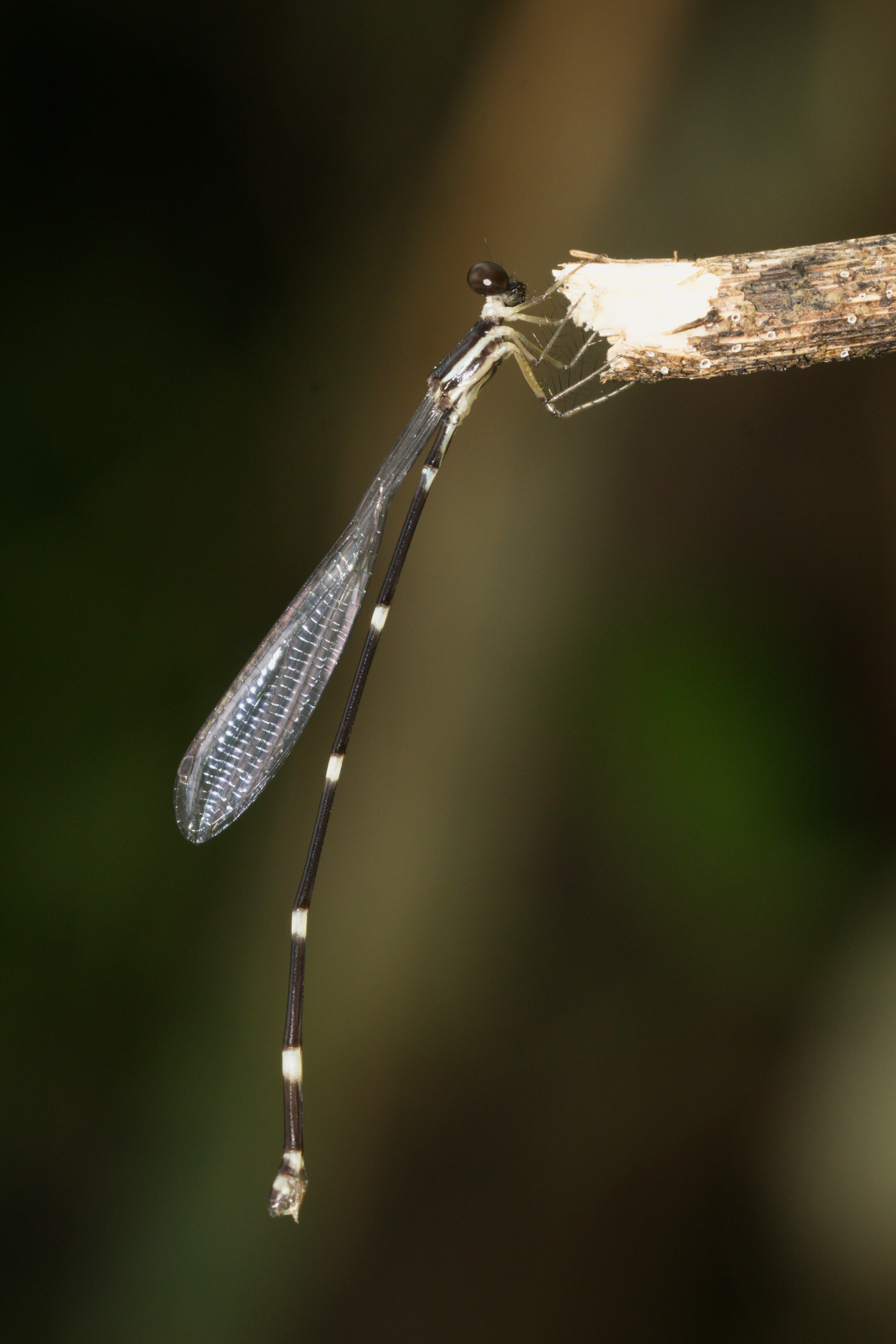
Protosticta gravelyi female

===== Species: Protosticta hearseyi =====
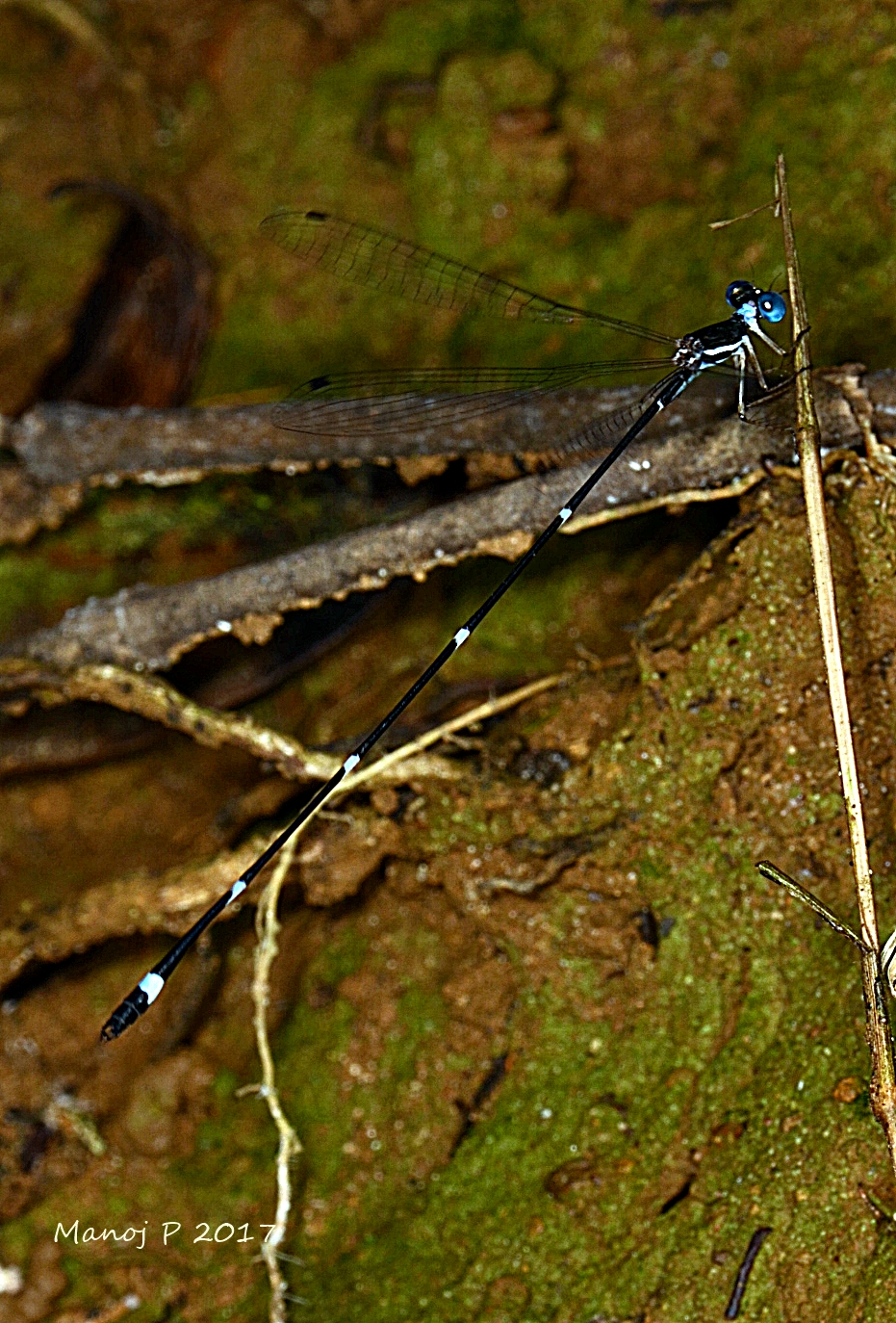
Protosticta hearseyi male

===== Species: Protosticta monticola =====
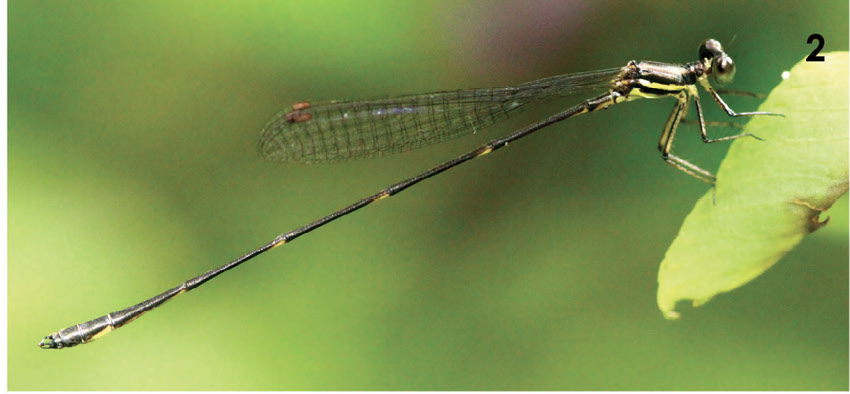
Protosticta monticola male

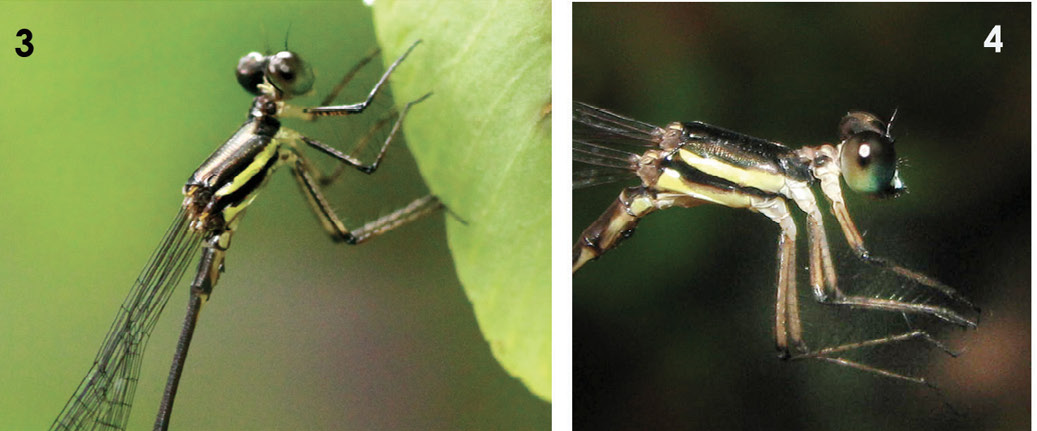
head

===== Species: Protosticta mortoni =====
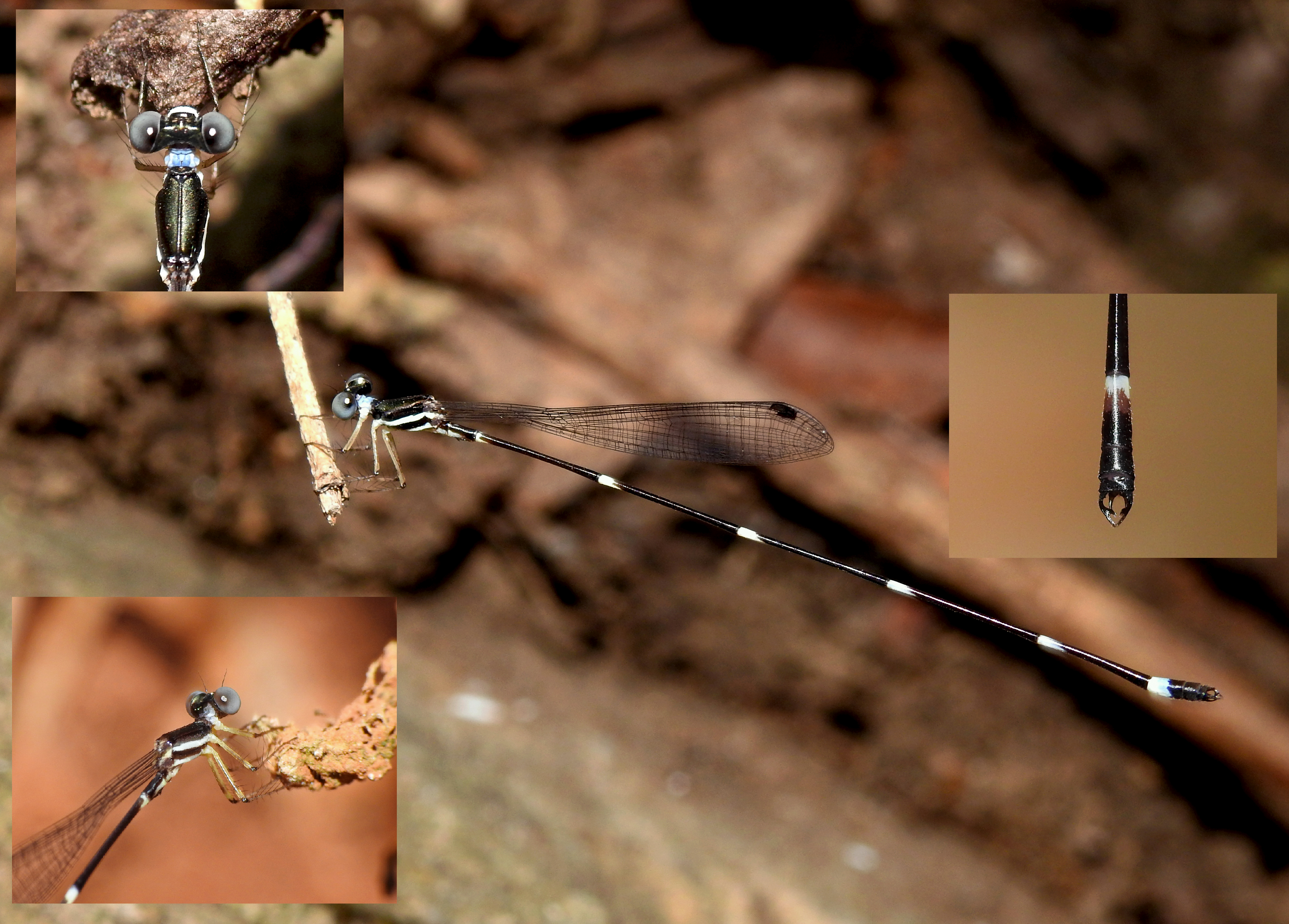
male

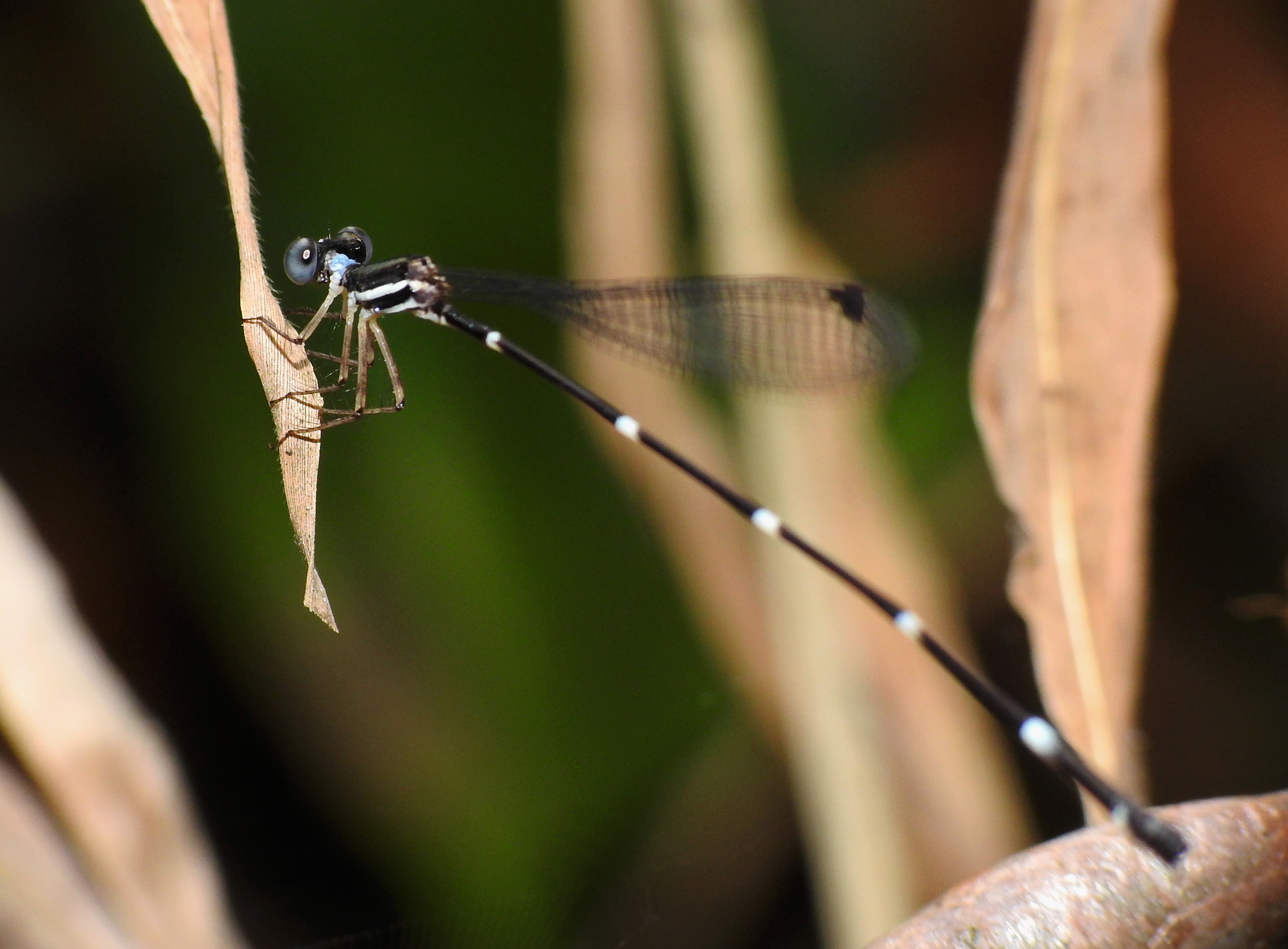
female

===== Species: Protosticta ponmudiensis =====
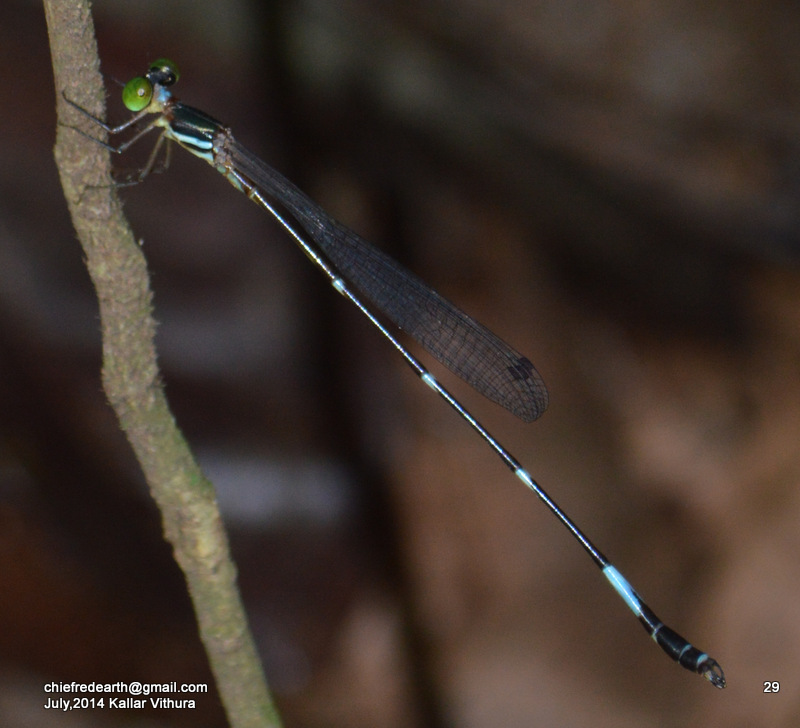
Protosticta ponmudiensis male

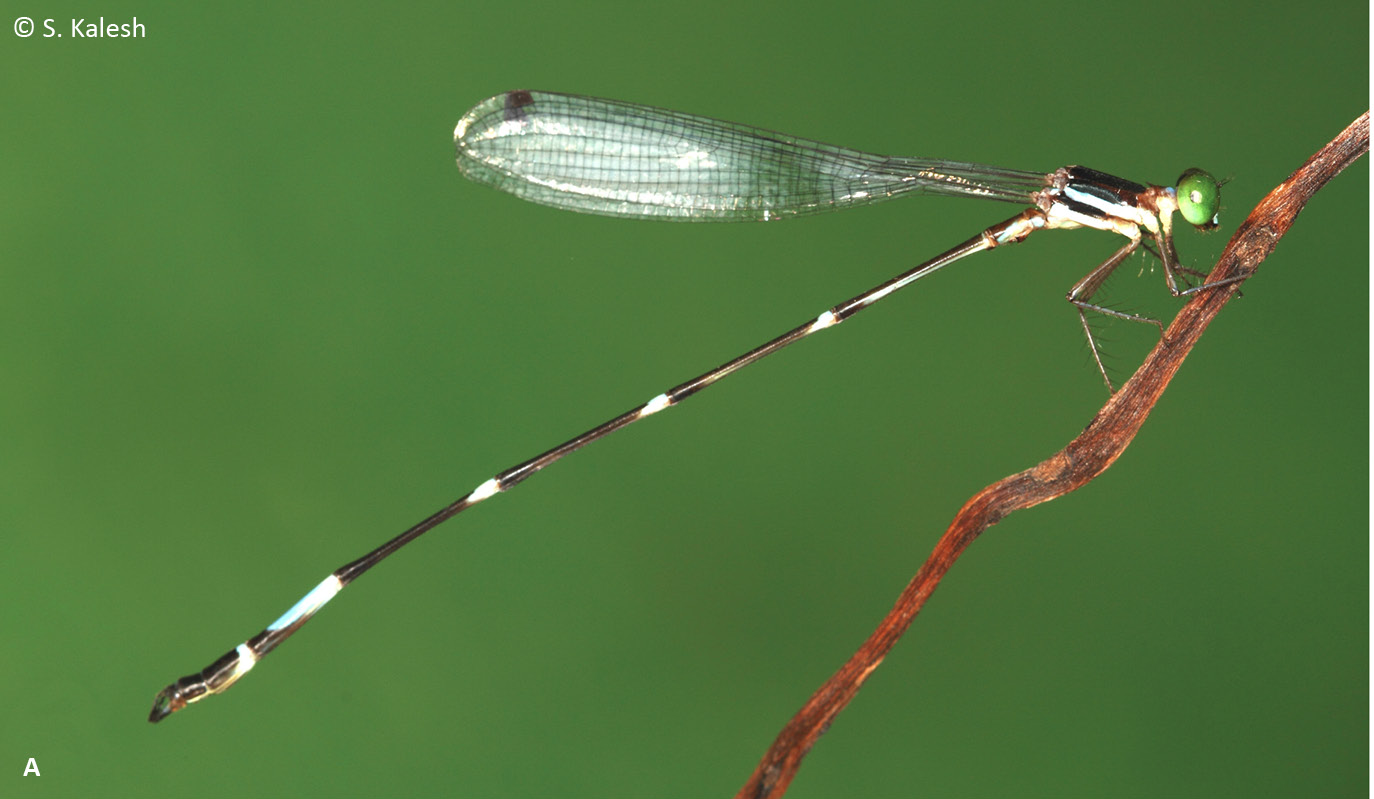
Protosticta ponmudiensis male

===== Species: Protosticta rufostigma =====
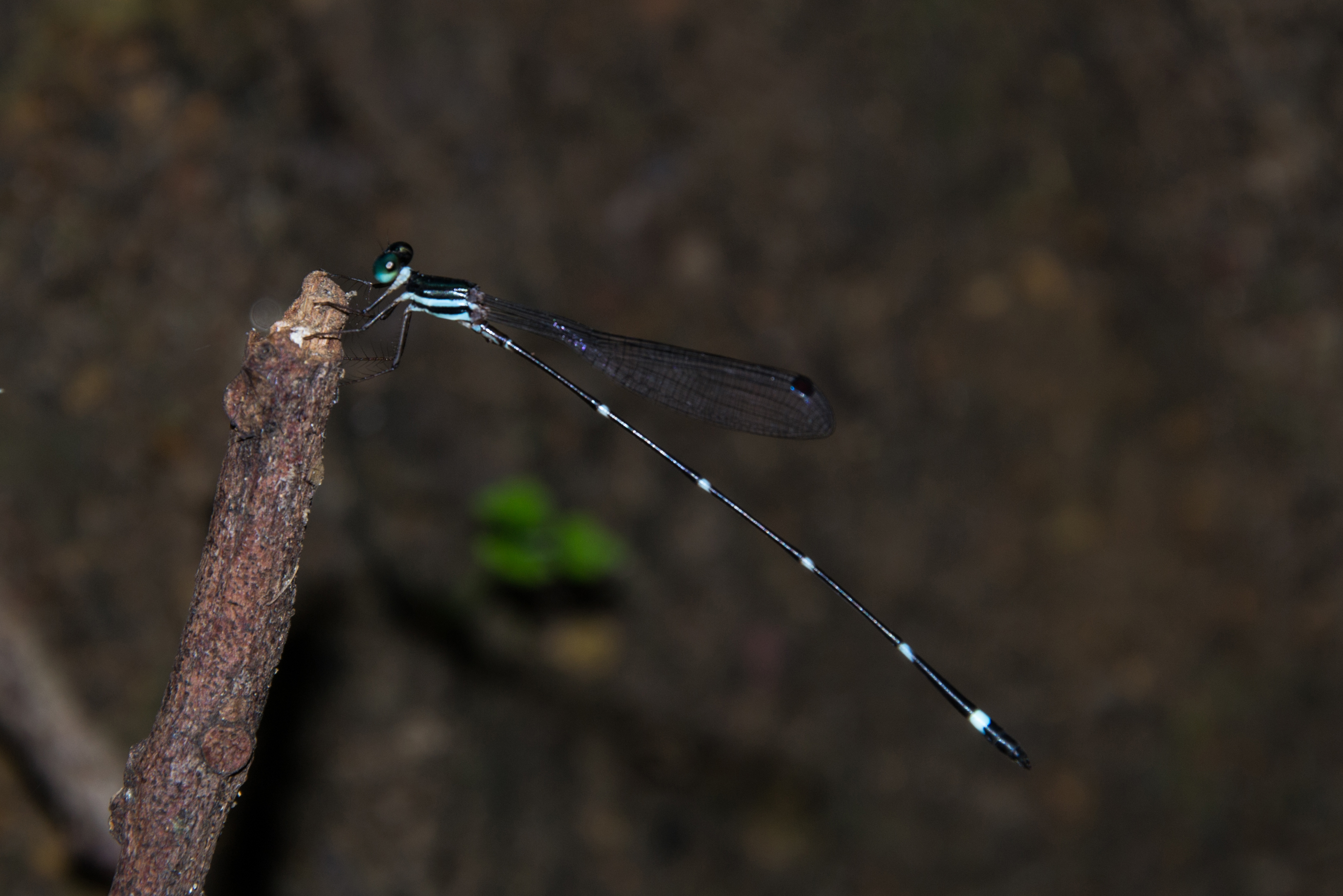
Protosticta rufostigma male

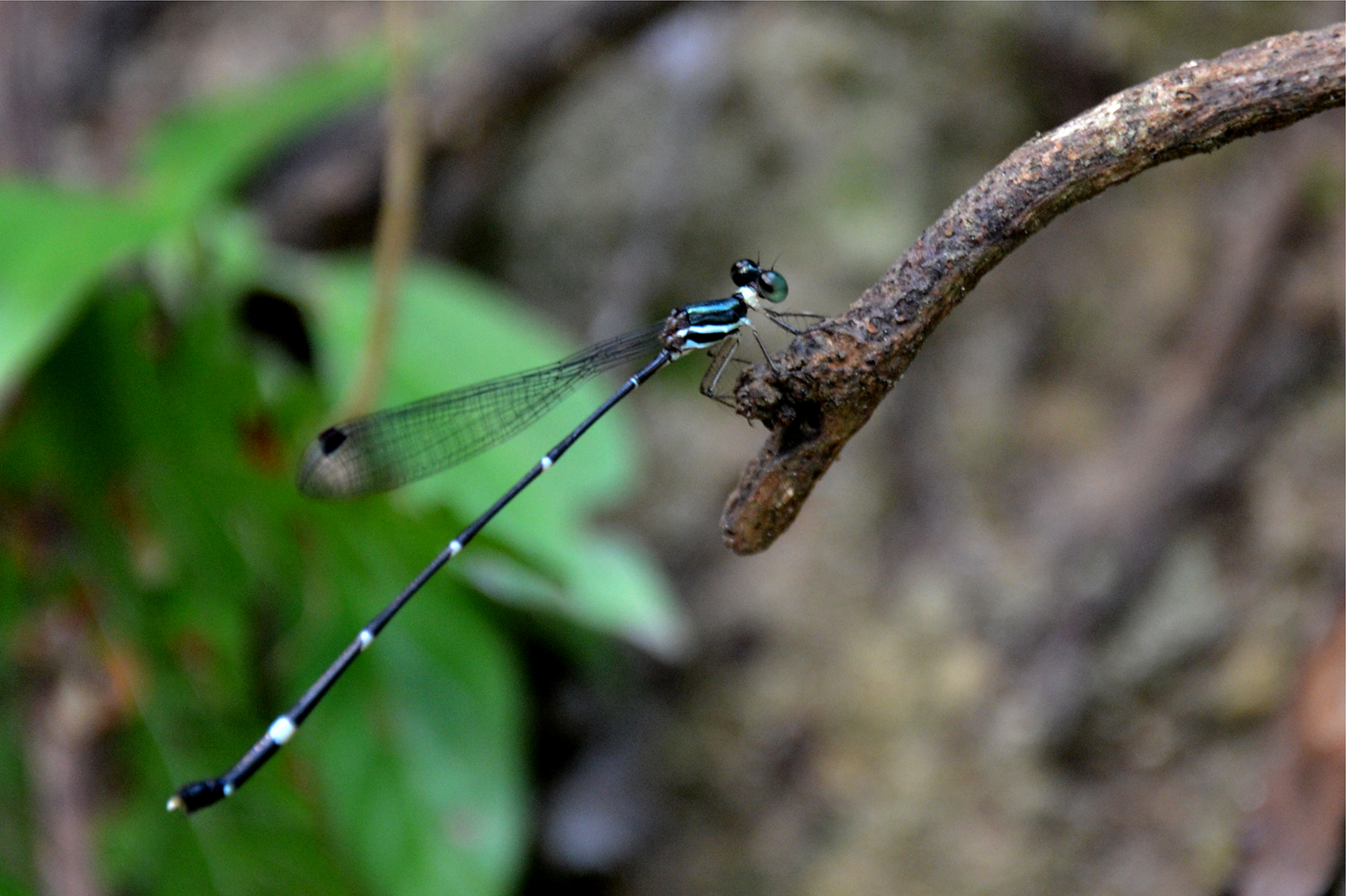
Protosticta rufostigma female

===== Species: Protosticta sanguinostigma =====
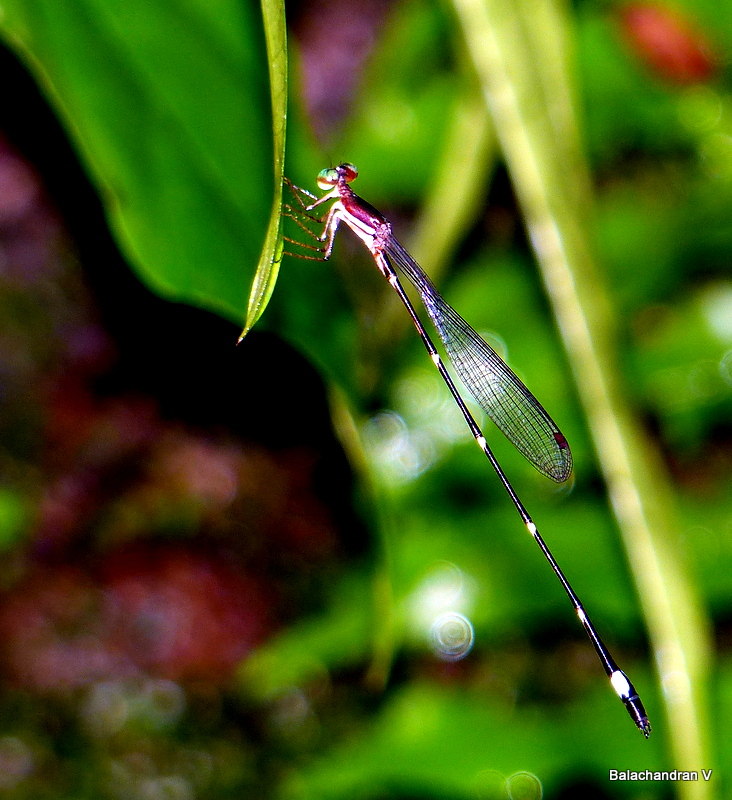
Protosticta sanguinostigma male

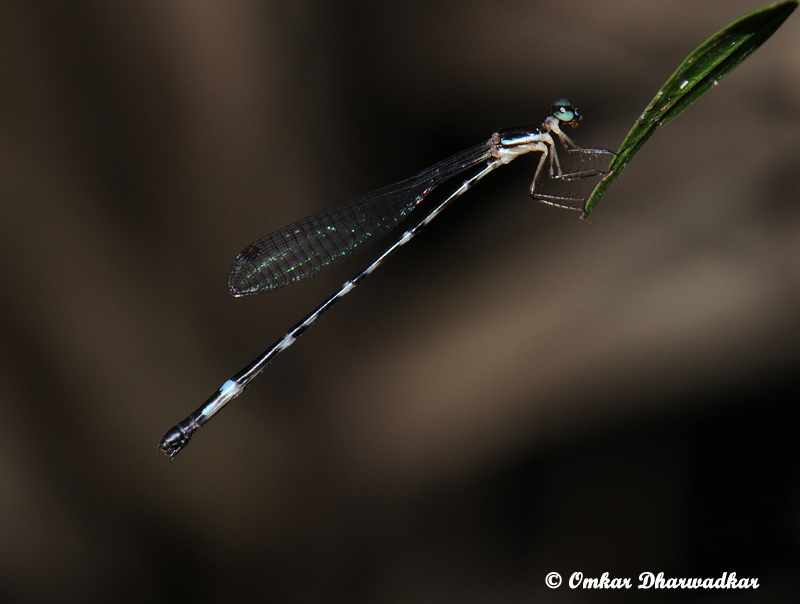
Protosticta sanguinostigma female

===== Species: Protosticta sholai =====
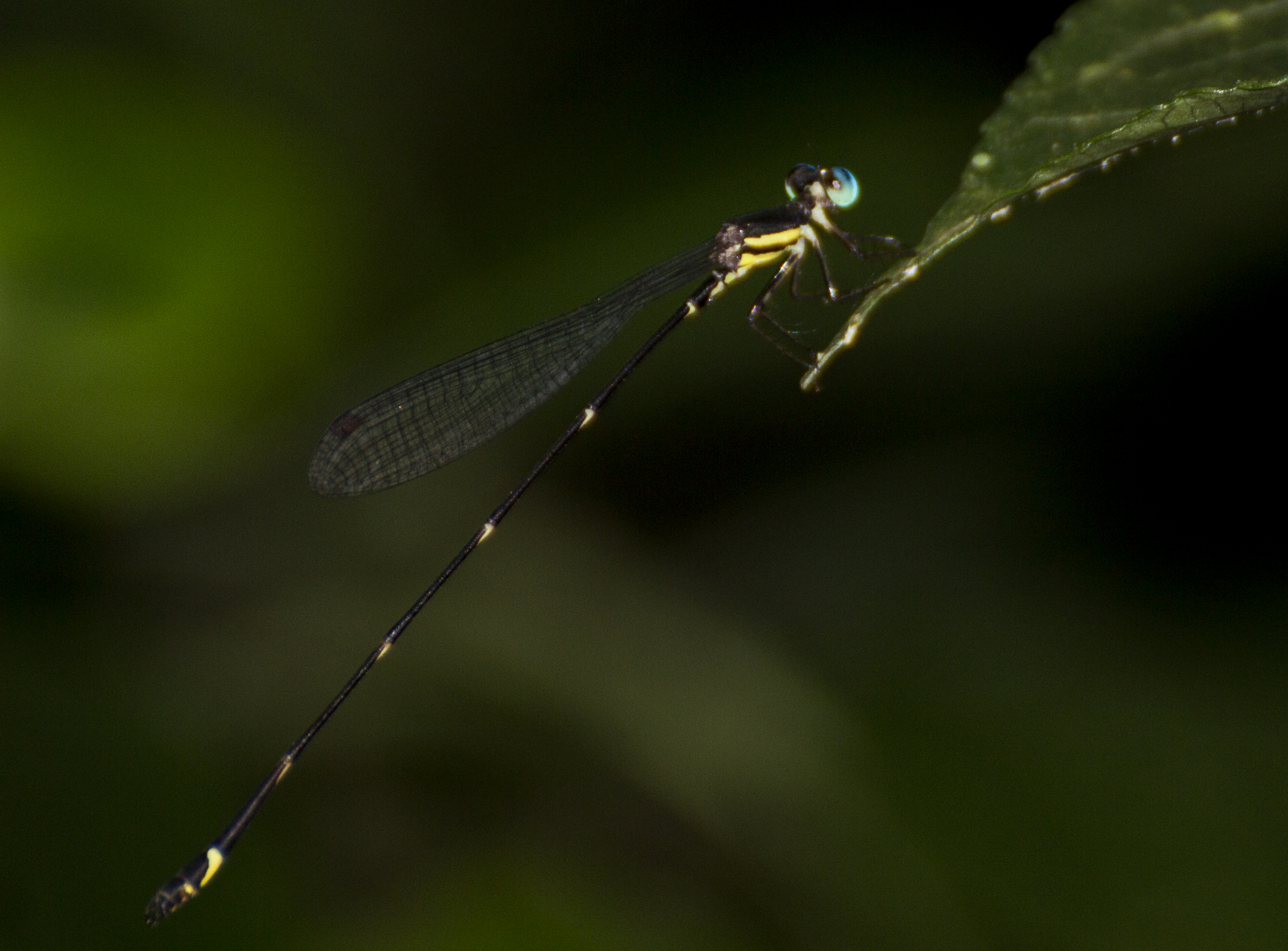
male

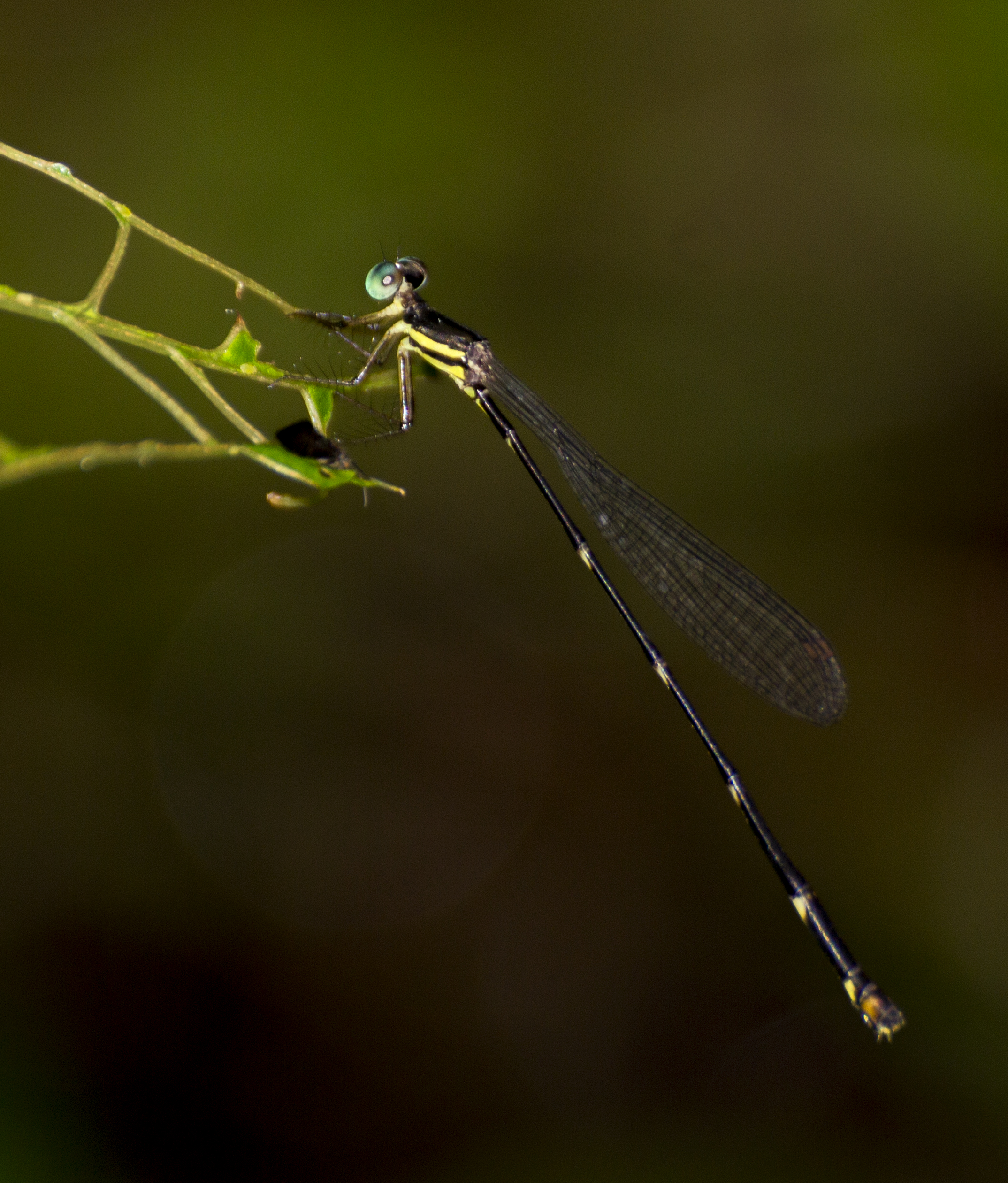
female

=== Family: Calopterygidae (Broad-winged damselflies) ===
==== Genus: Neurobasis ====
===== Species: Neurobasis chinensis =====
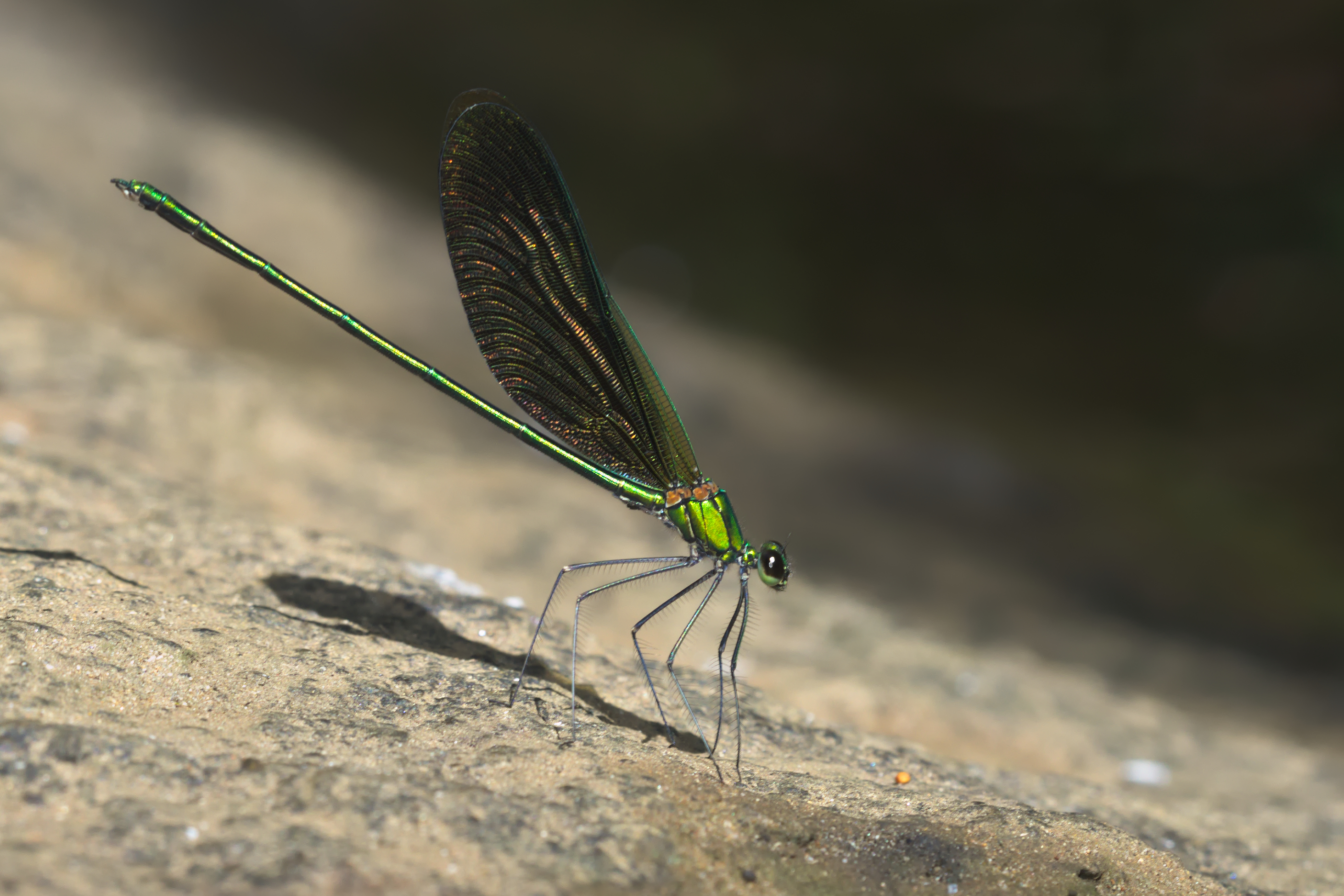
Neurobasis chinensis male

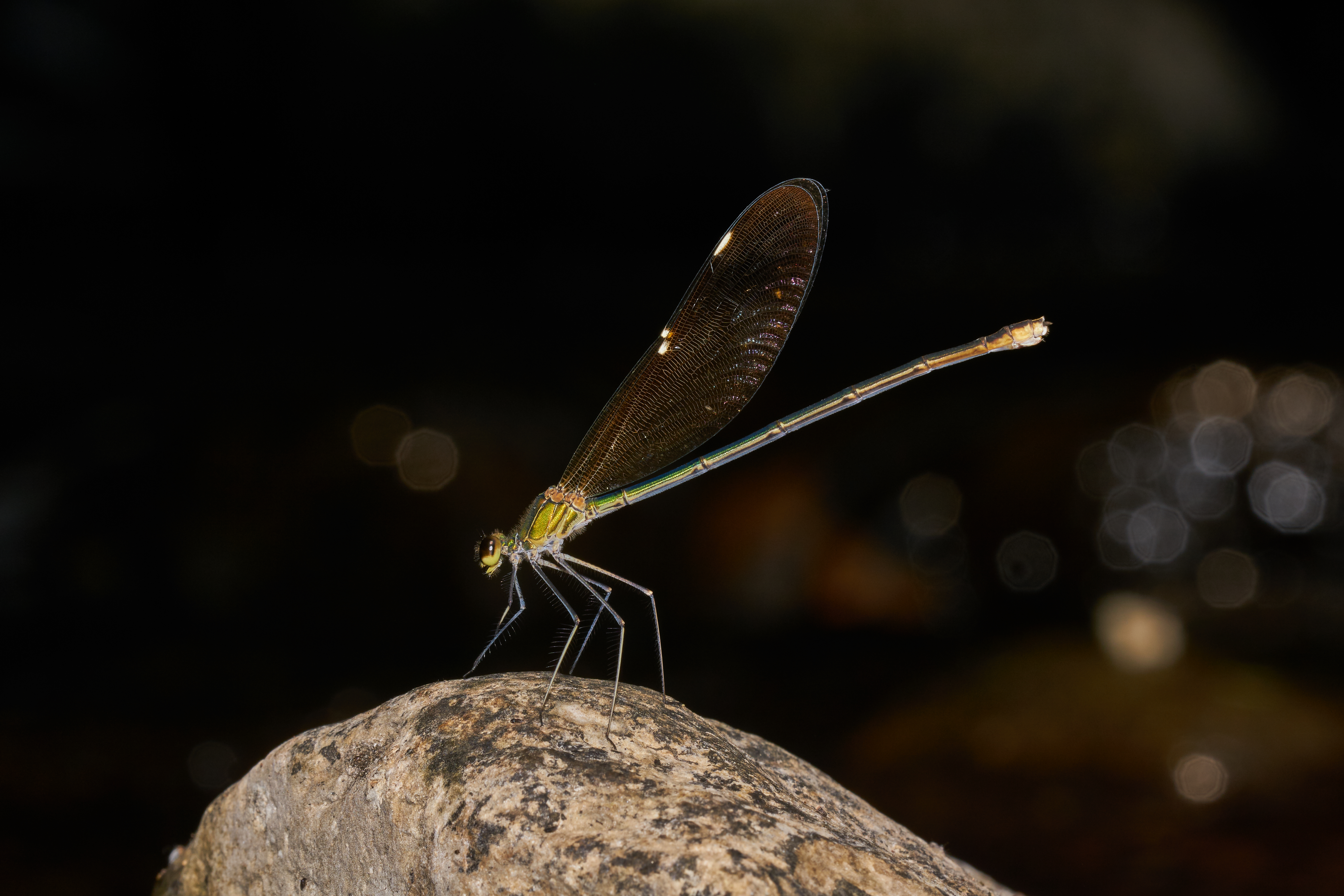
Neurobasis chinensis female

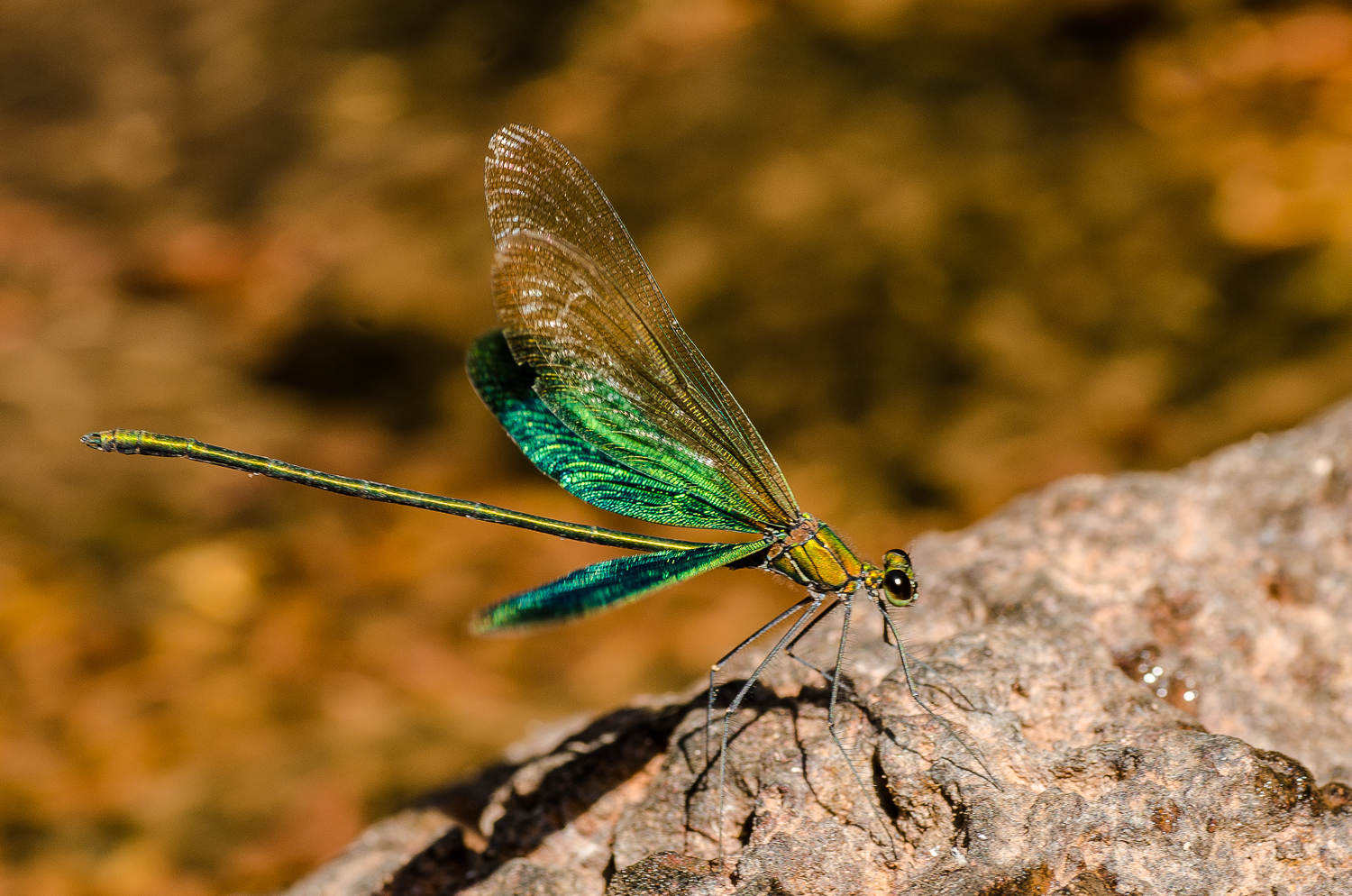
Neurobasis chinensis male (wing flashing)

==== Genus: Vestalis ====
===== Species: Vestalis apicalis =====
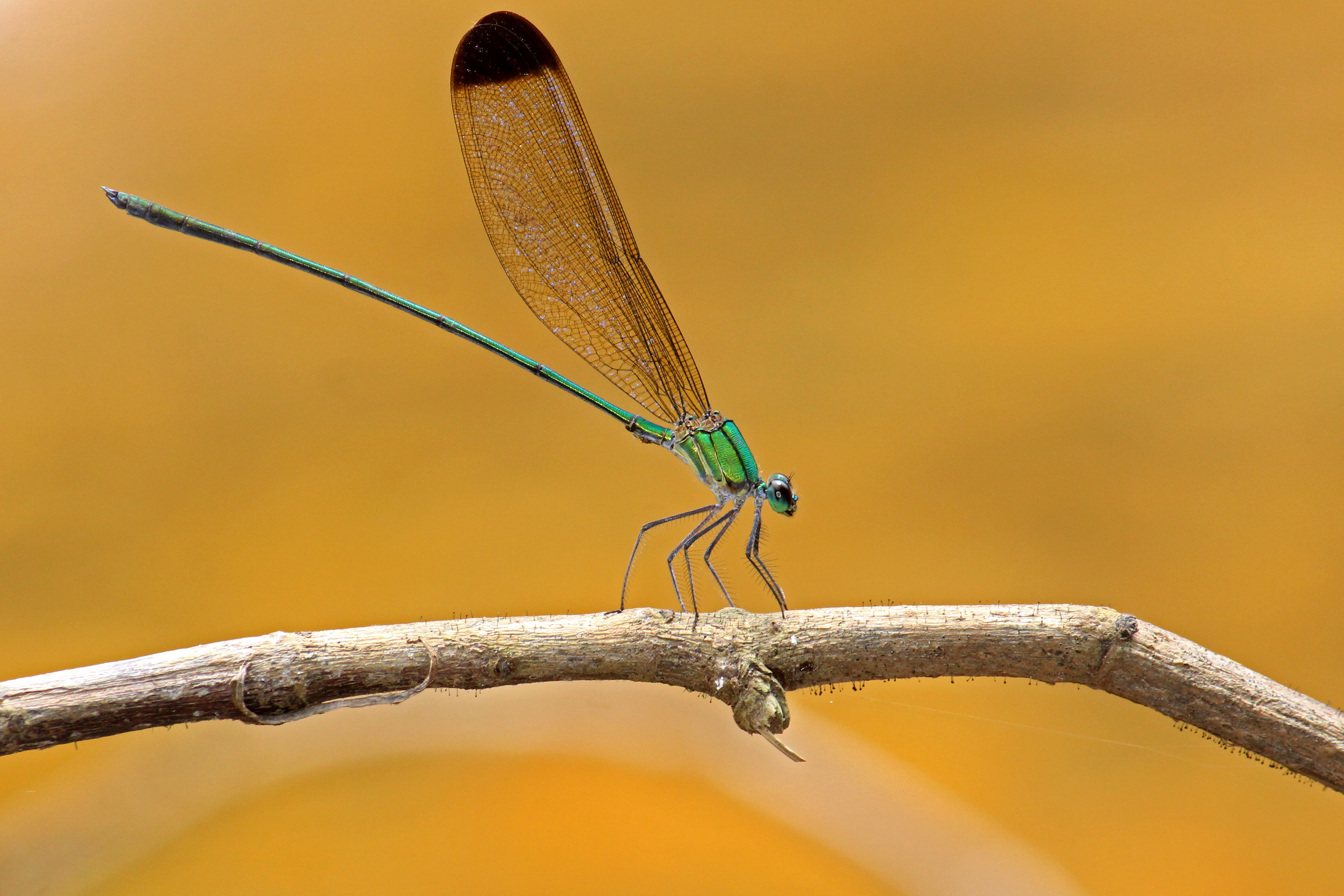
Vestalis apicalis male

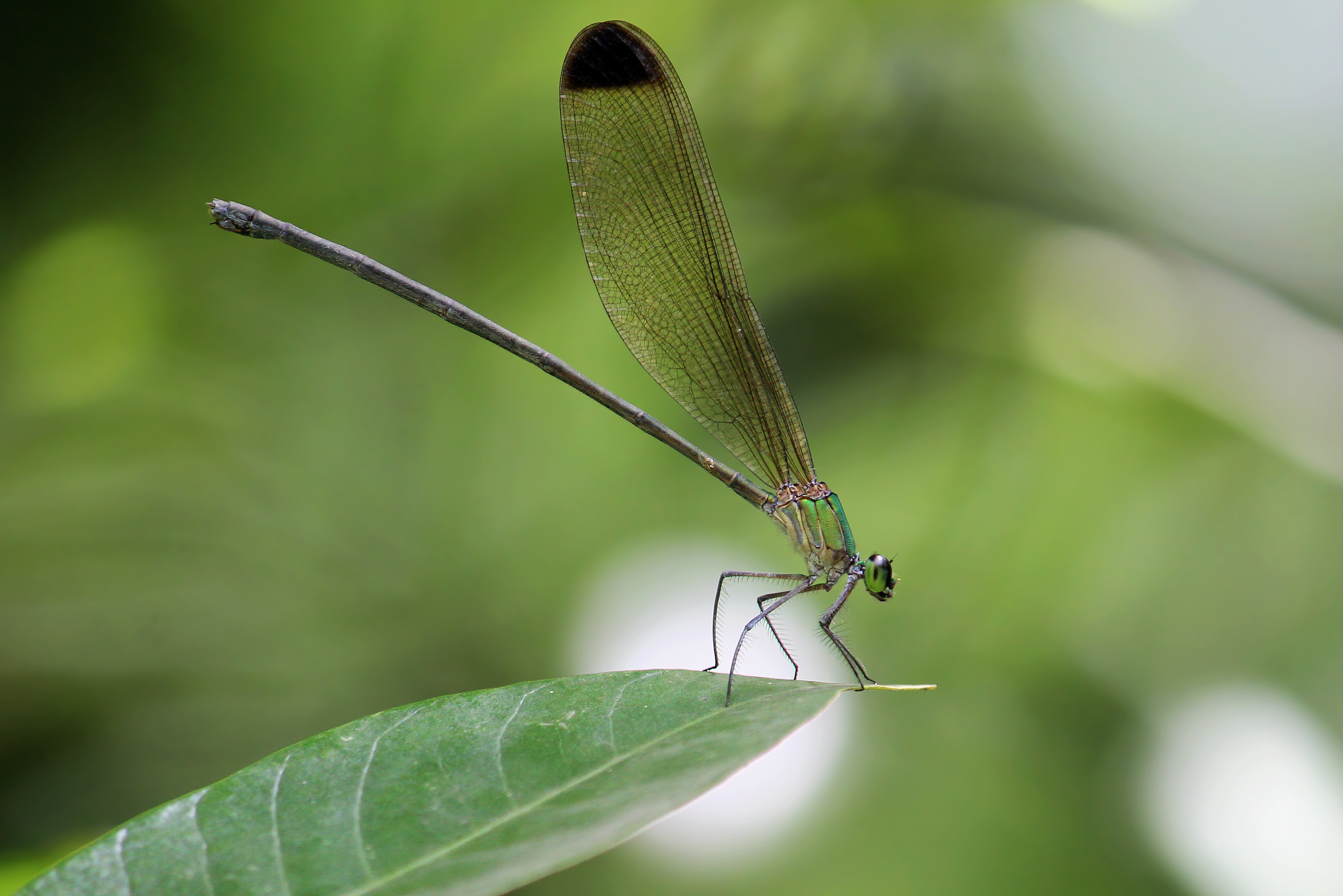
Vestalis apicalis female

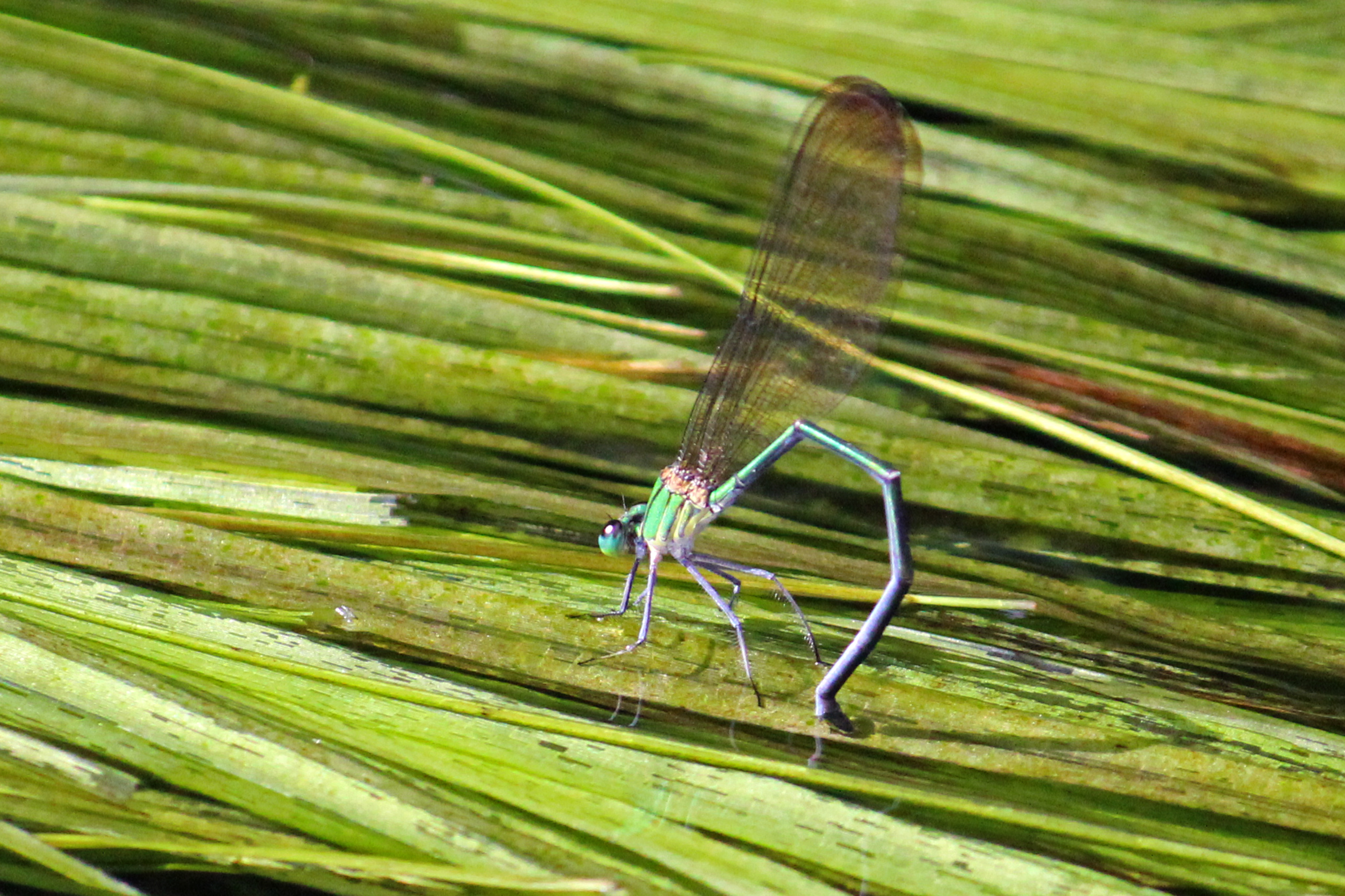
ovipositing

===== Species: Vestalis gracilis =====
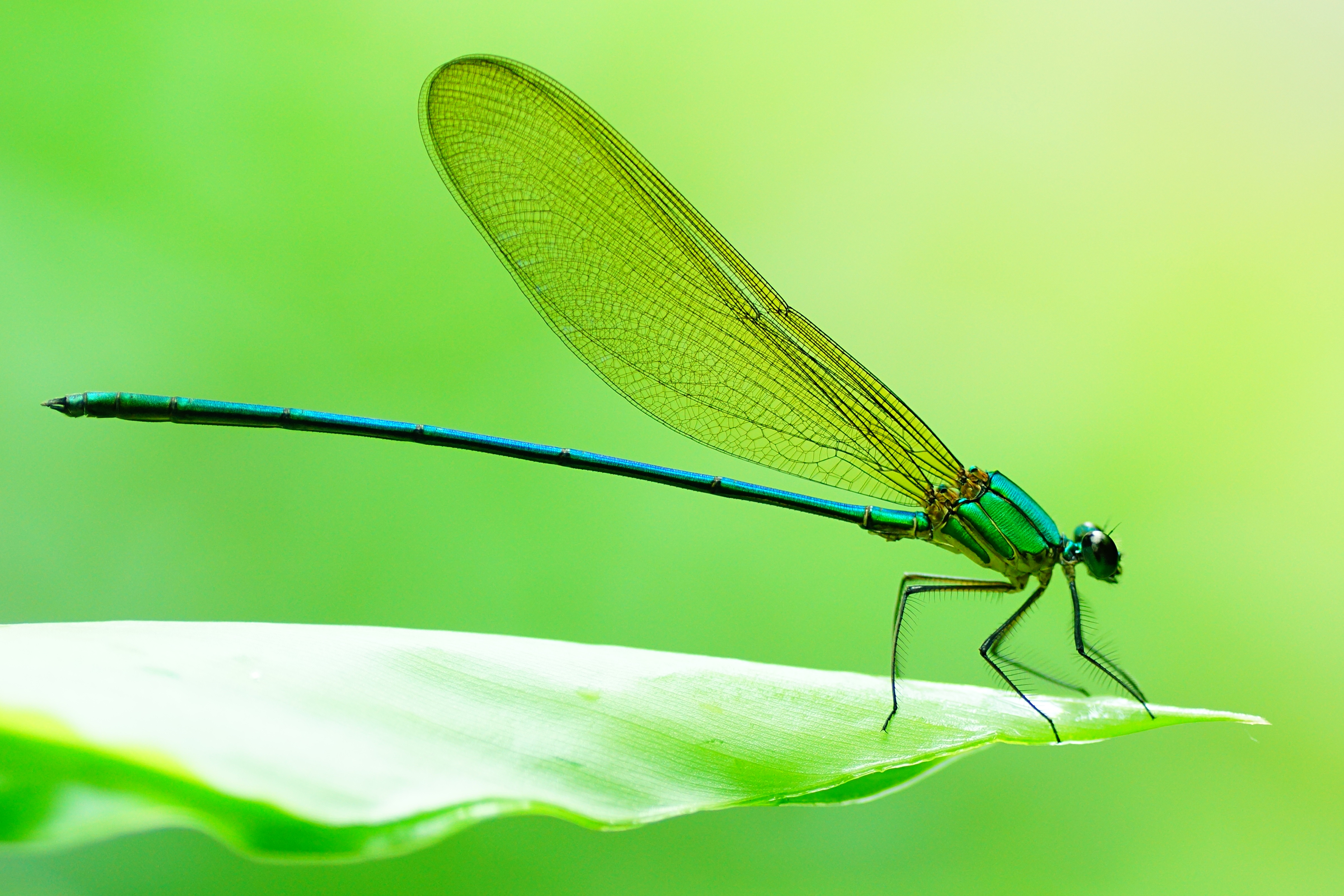
Vestalis gracilis male

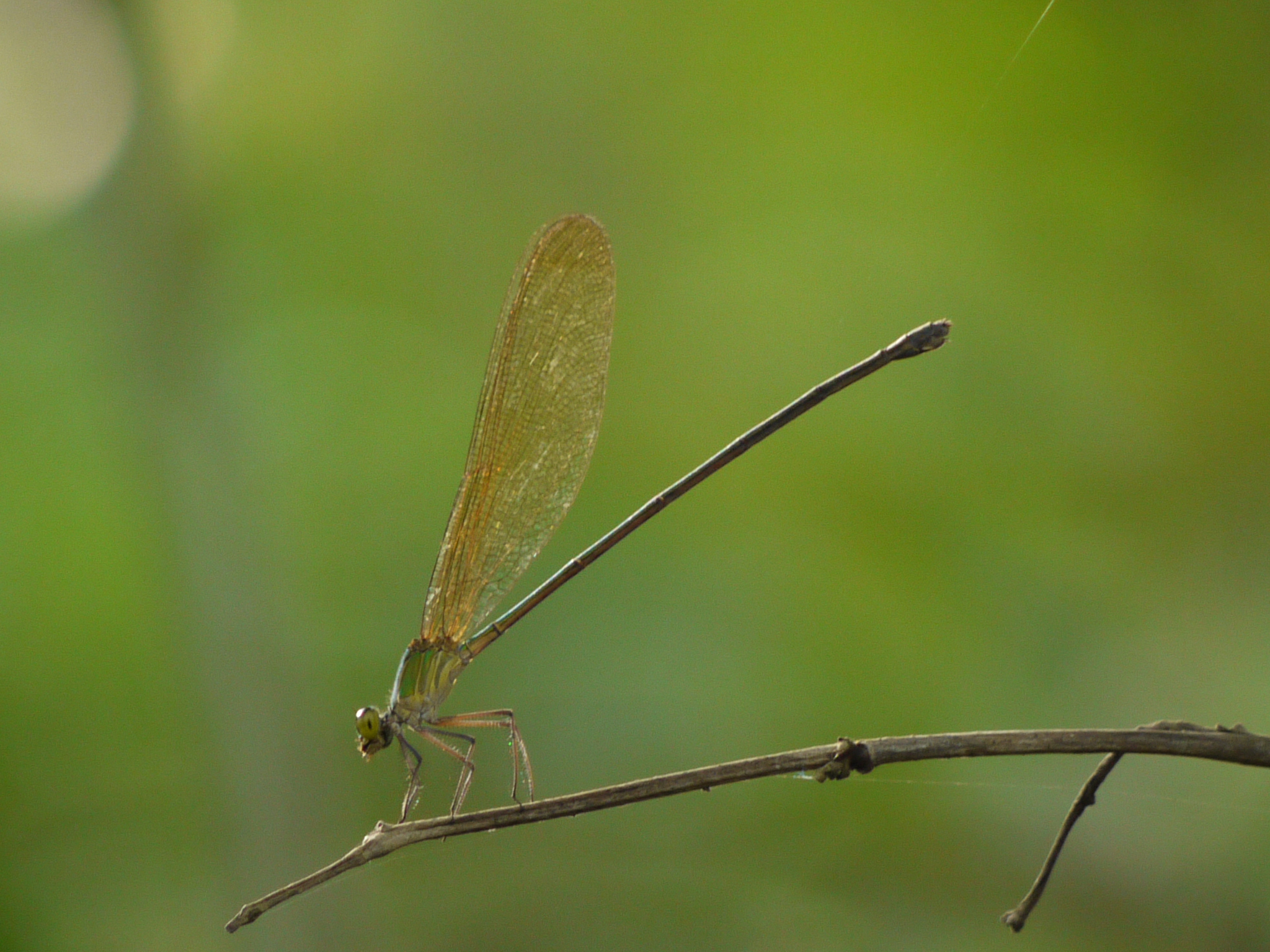
Vestalis gracilis female

===== Species: Vestalis submontana =====
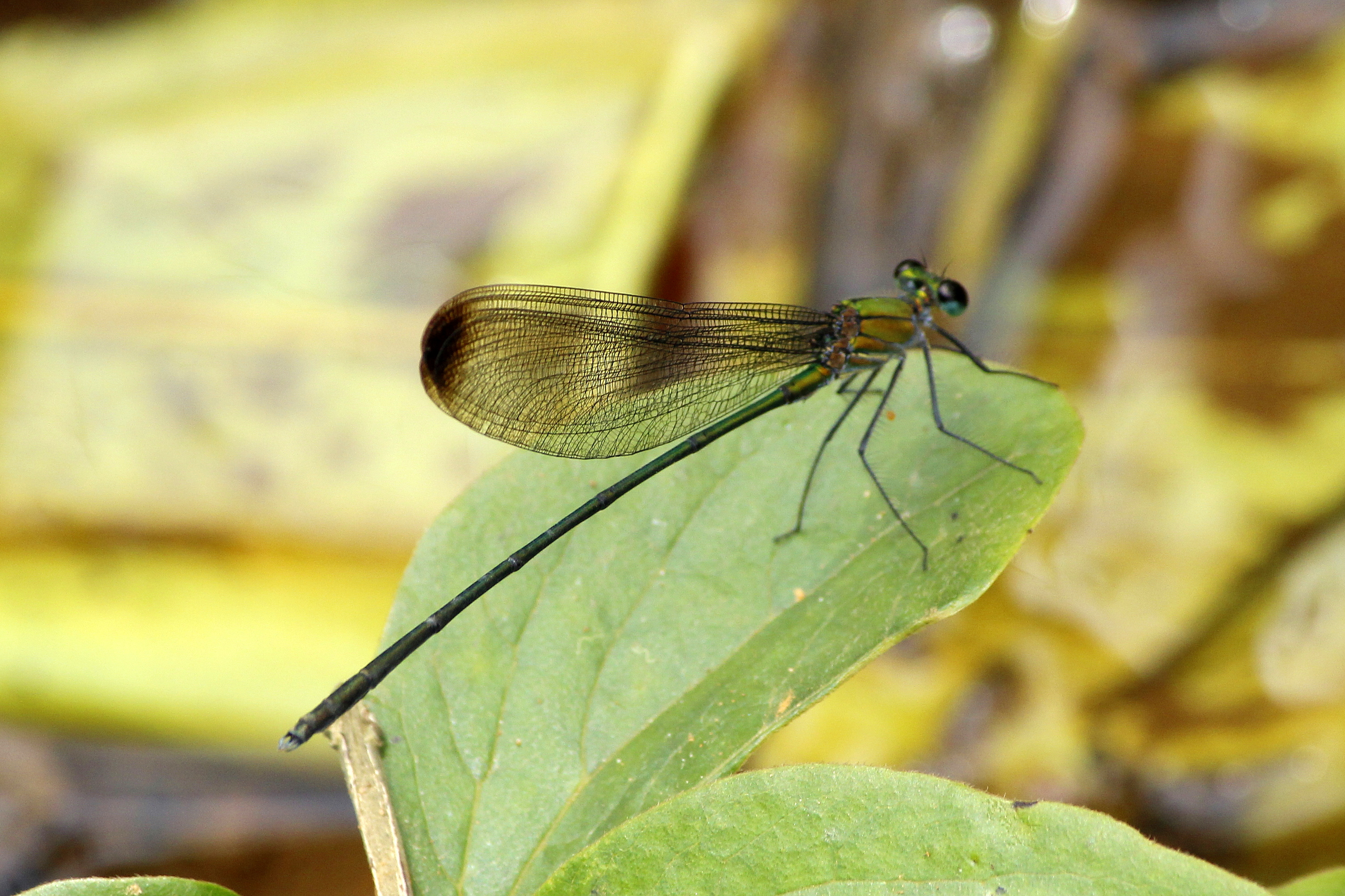
Vestalis submontana male

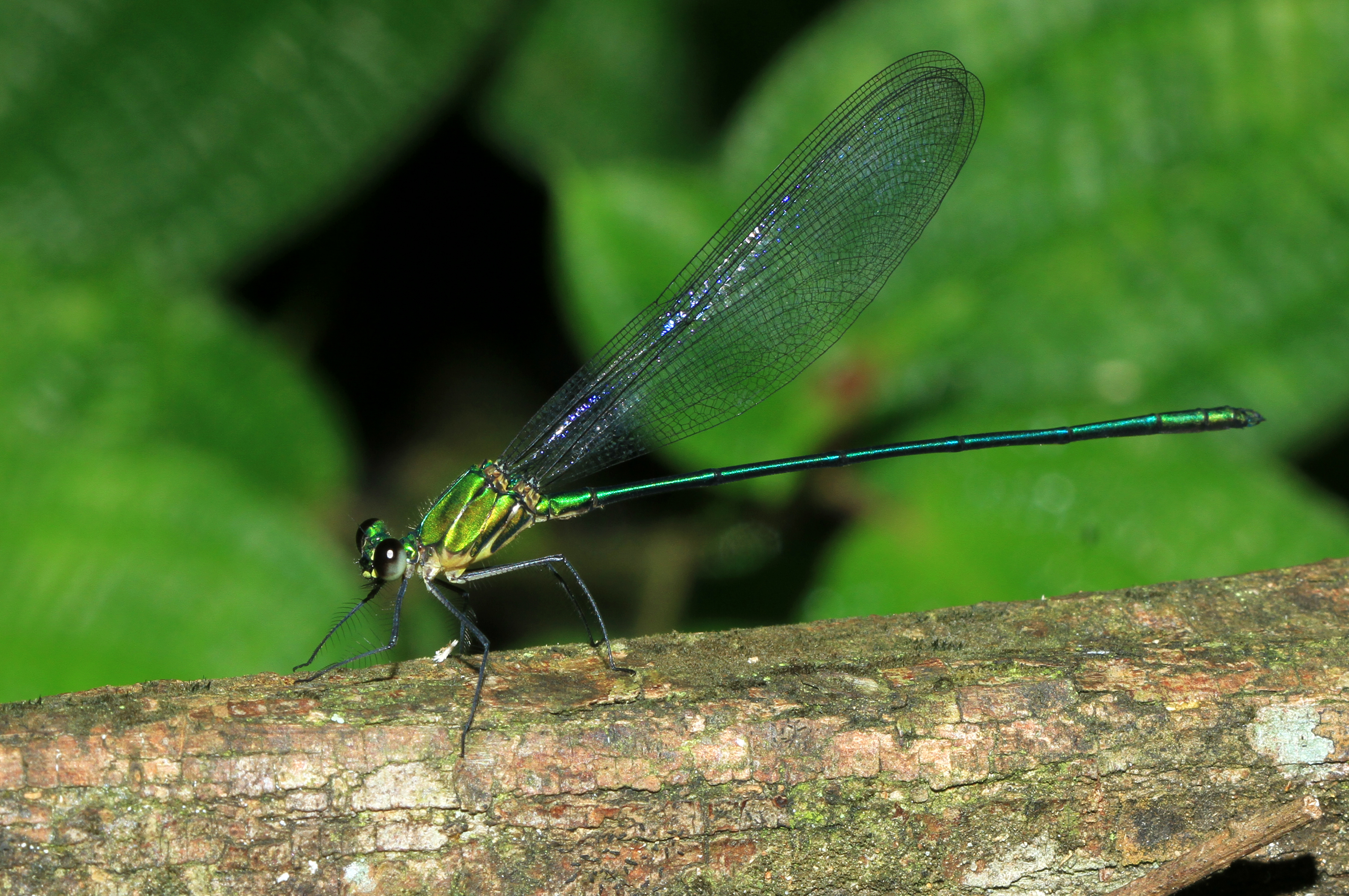
Vestalis submontana sub-adult male

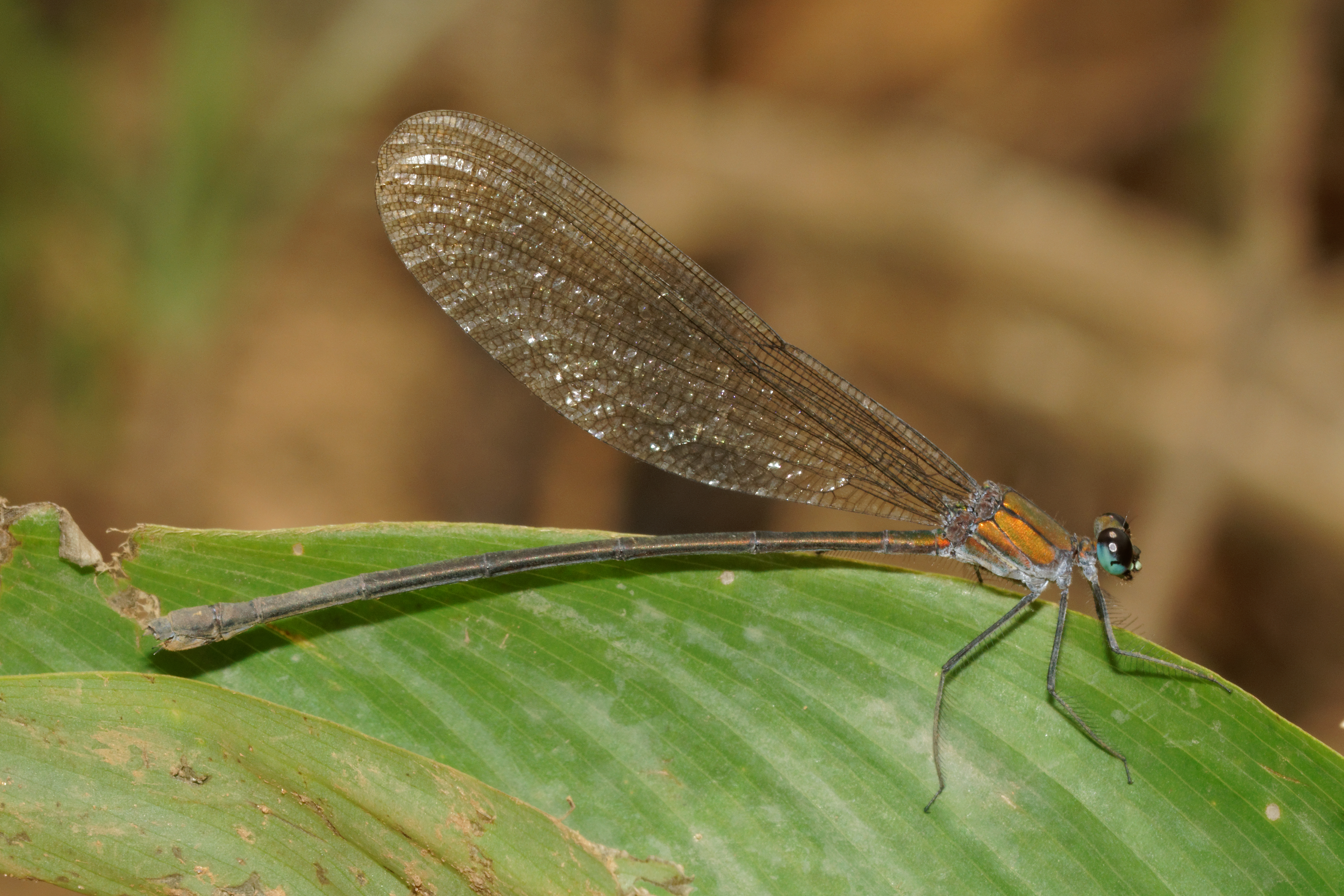
Vestalis submontana female

=== Family: Chlorocyphidae (Stream Jewels) ===
==== Genus: Calocypha ====
===== Species: Calocypha laidlawi =====
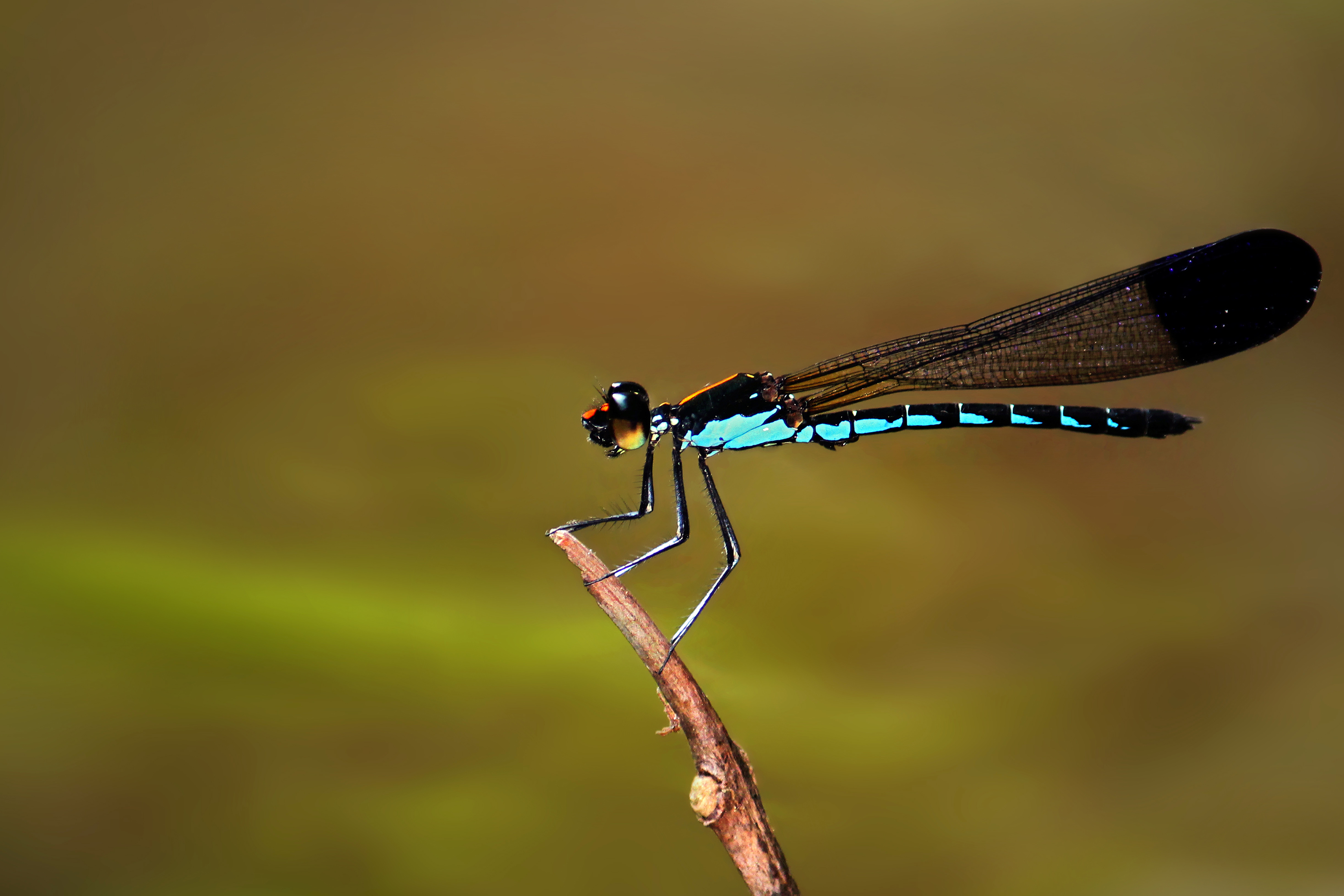
male

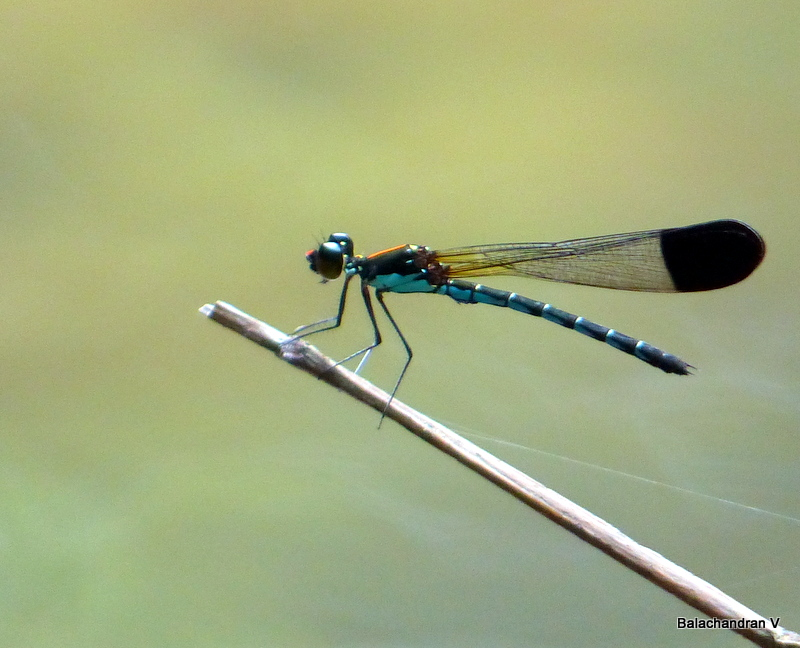
Calocypha laidlawi male

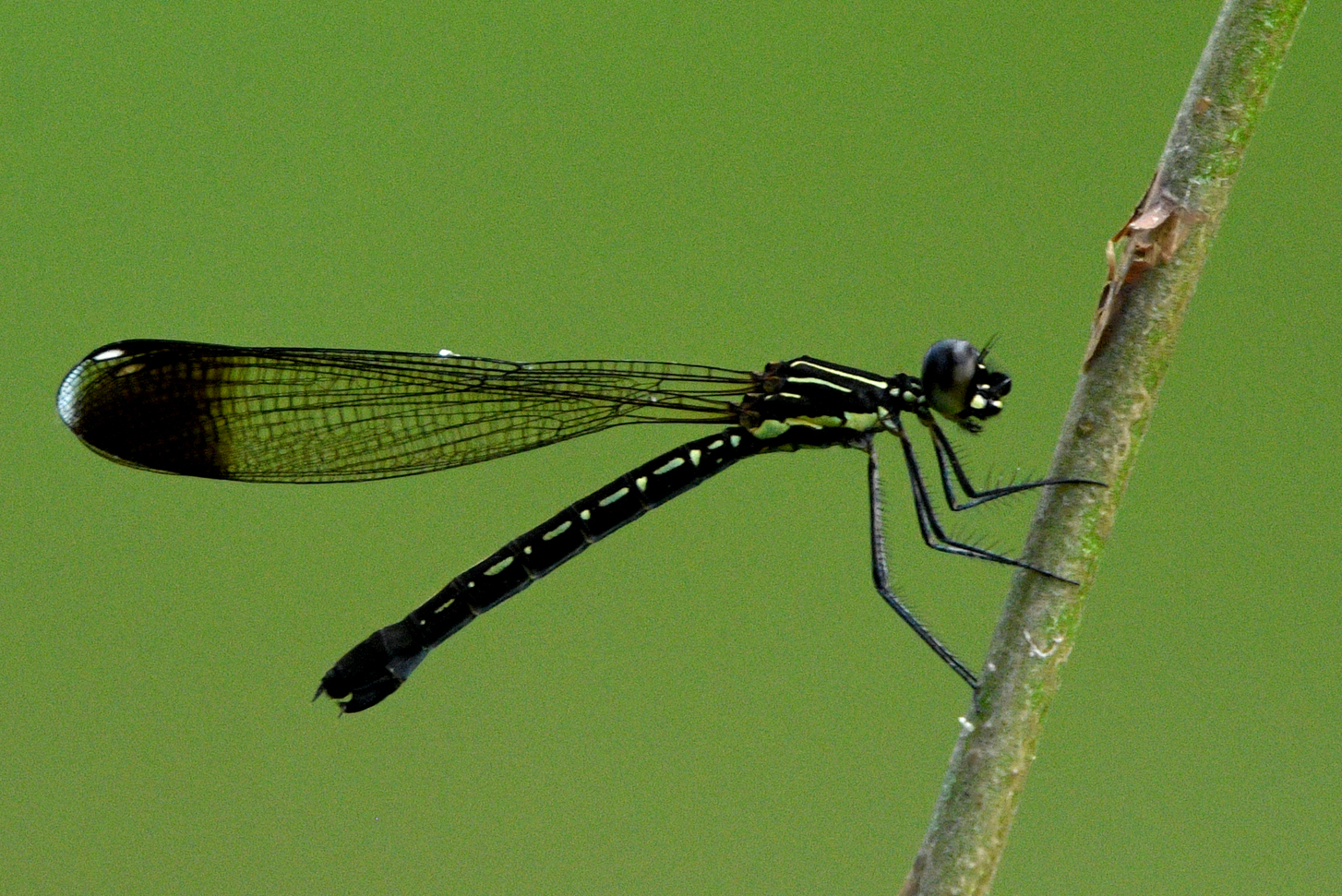
Calocypha laidlawi female

==== Genus: Heliocypha ====
===== Species: Heliocypha bisignata =====
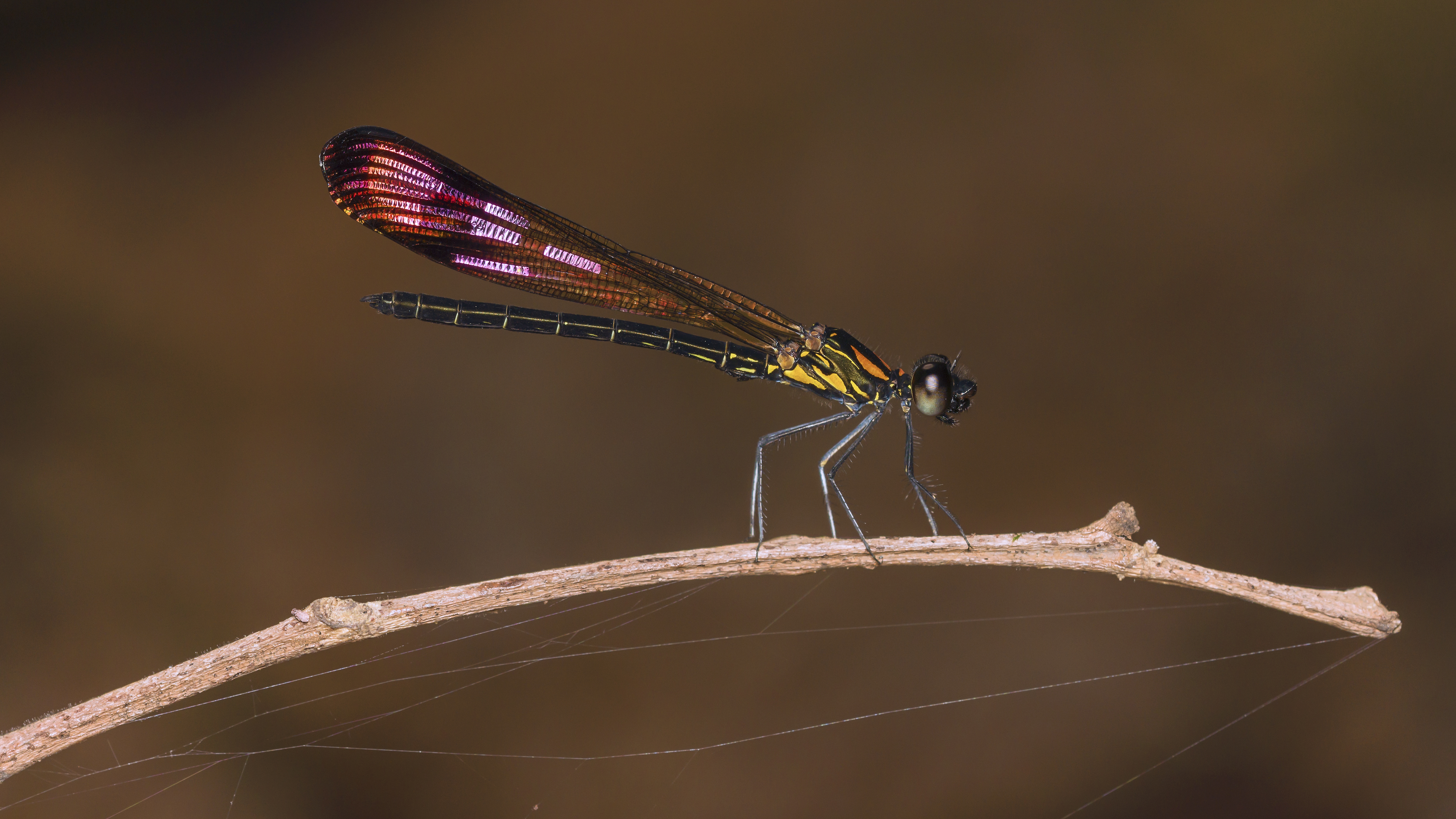
Heliocypha bisignata male

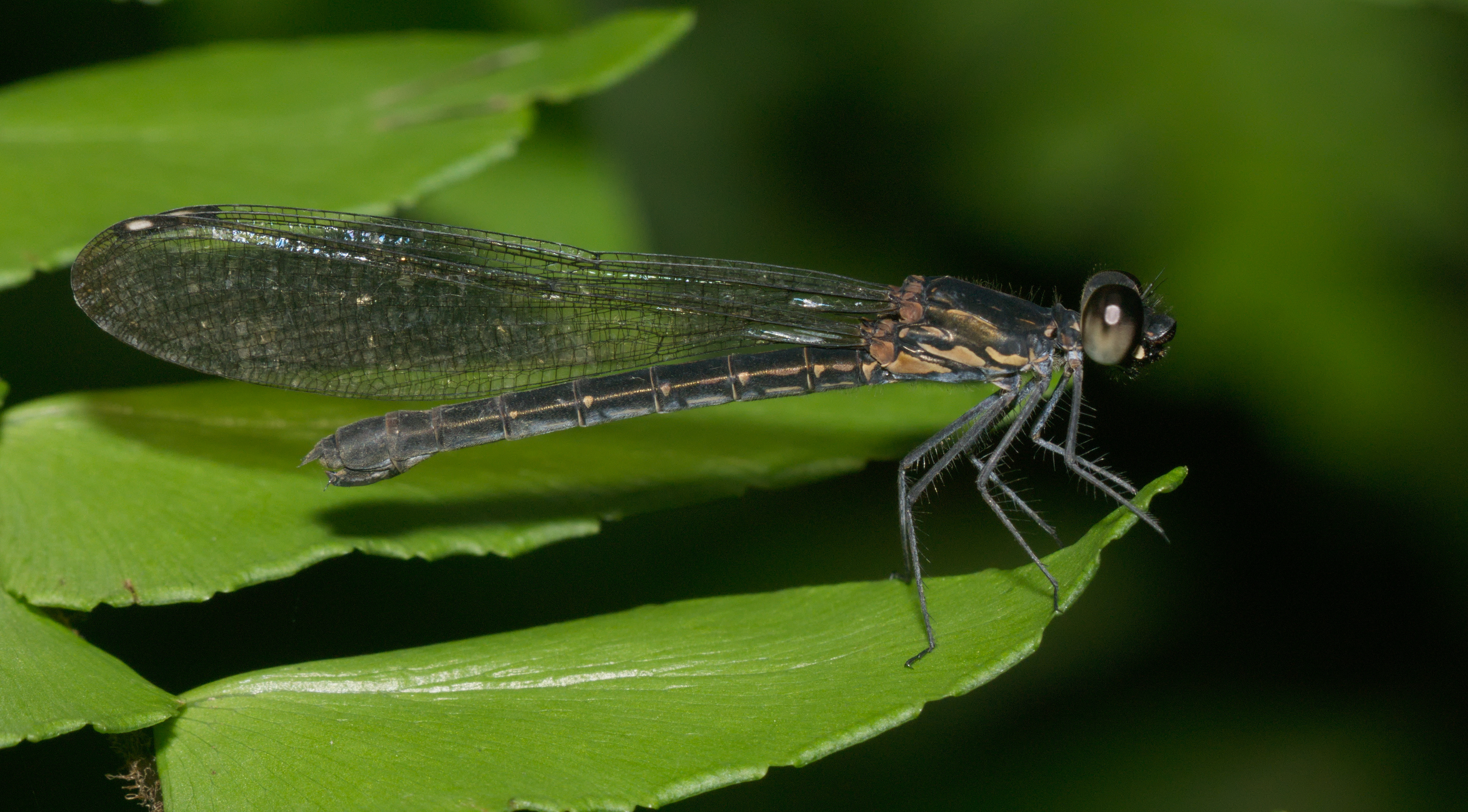
Heliocypha bisignata female

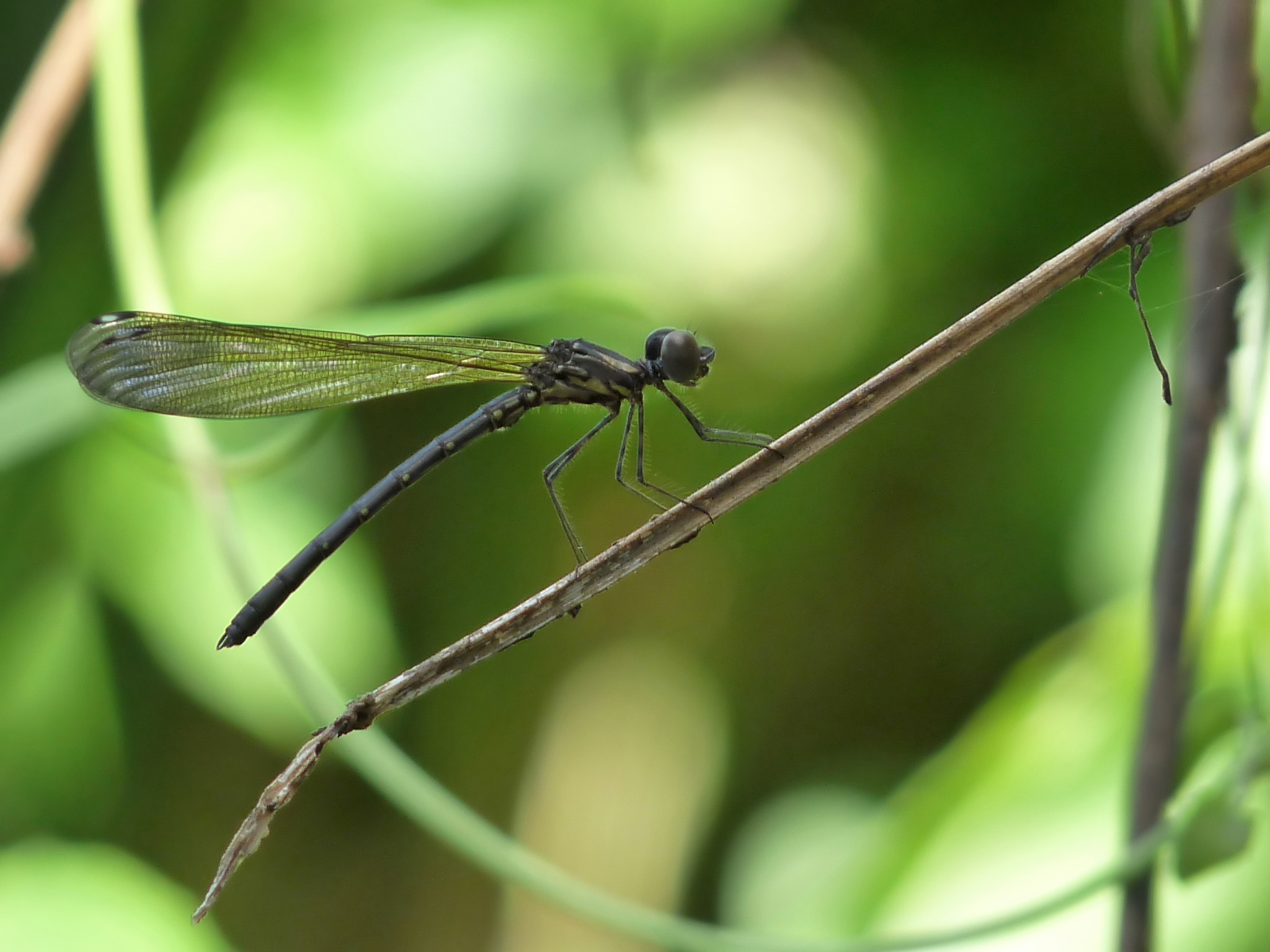
Heliocypha bisignata teneral male

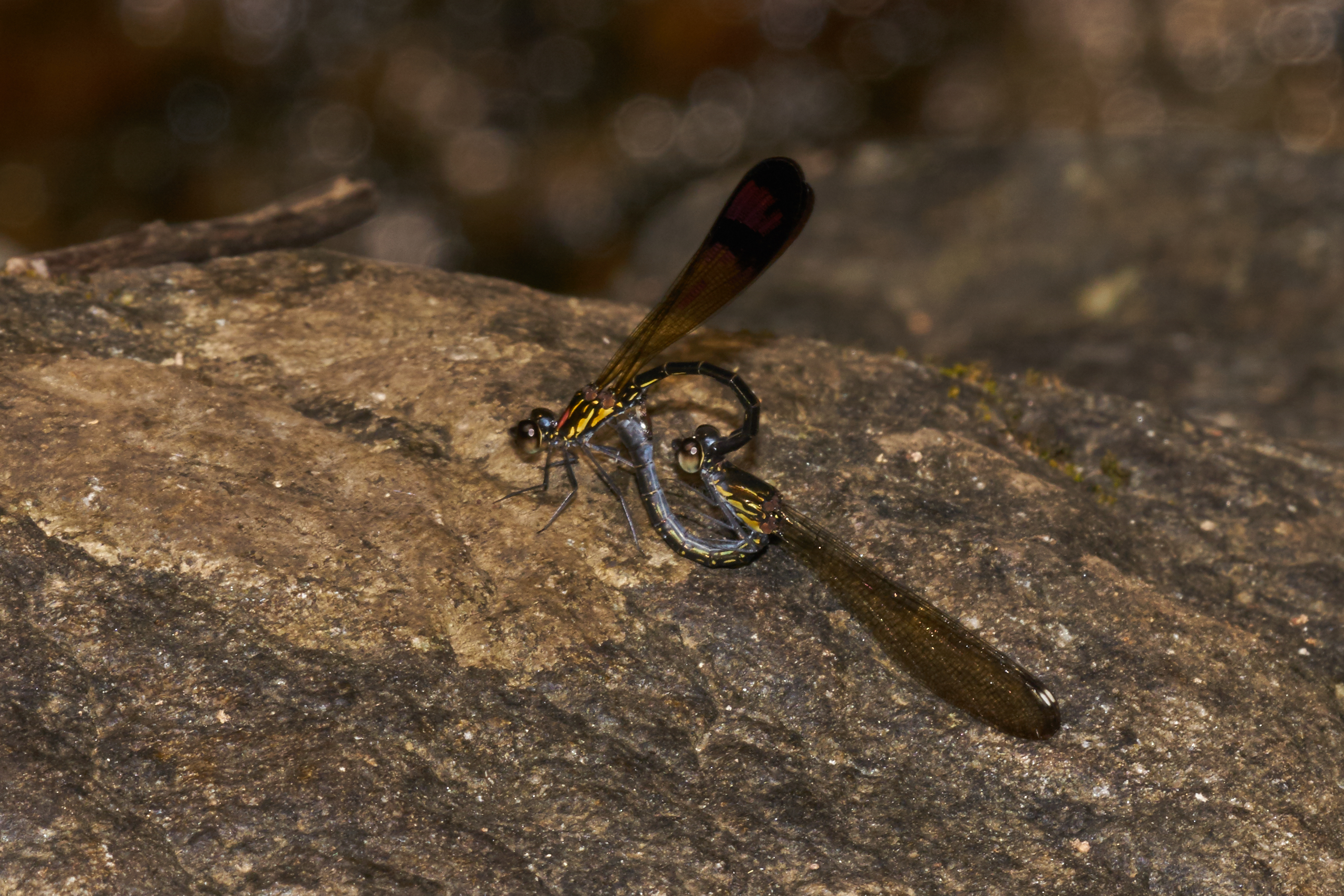
Heliocypha bisignata mating pair

==== Genus: Libellago ====
===== Species: Libellago indica =====
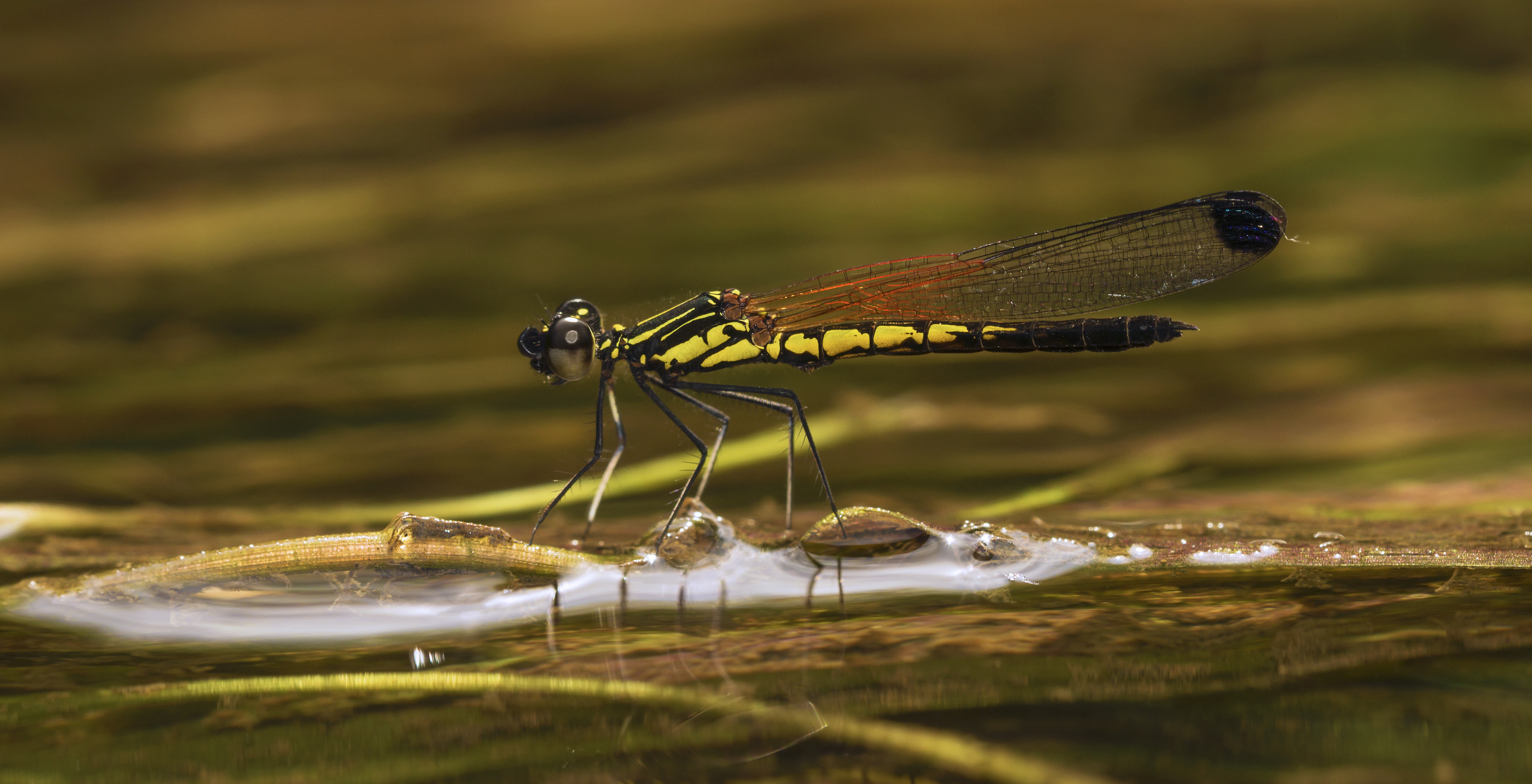
Libellago indica male

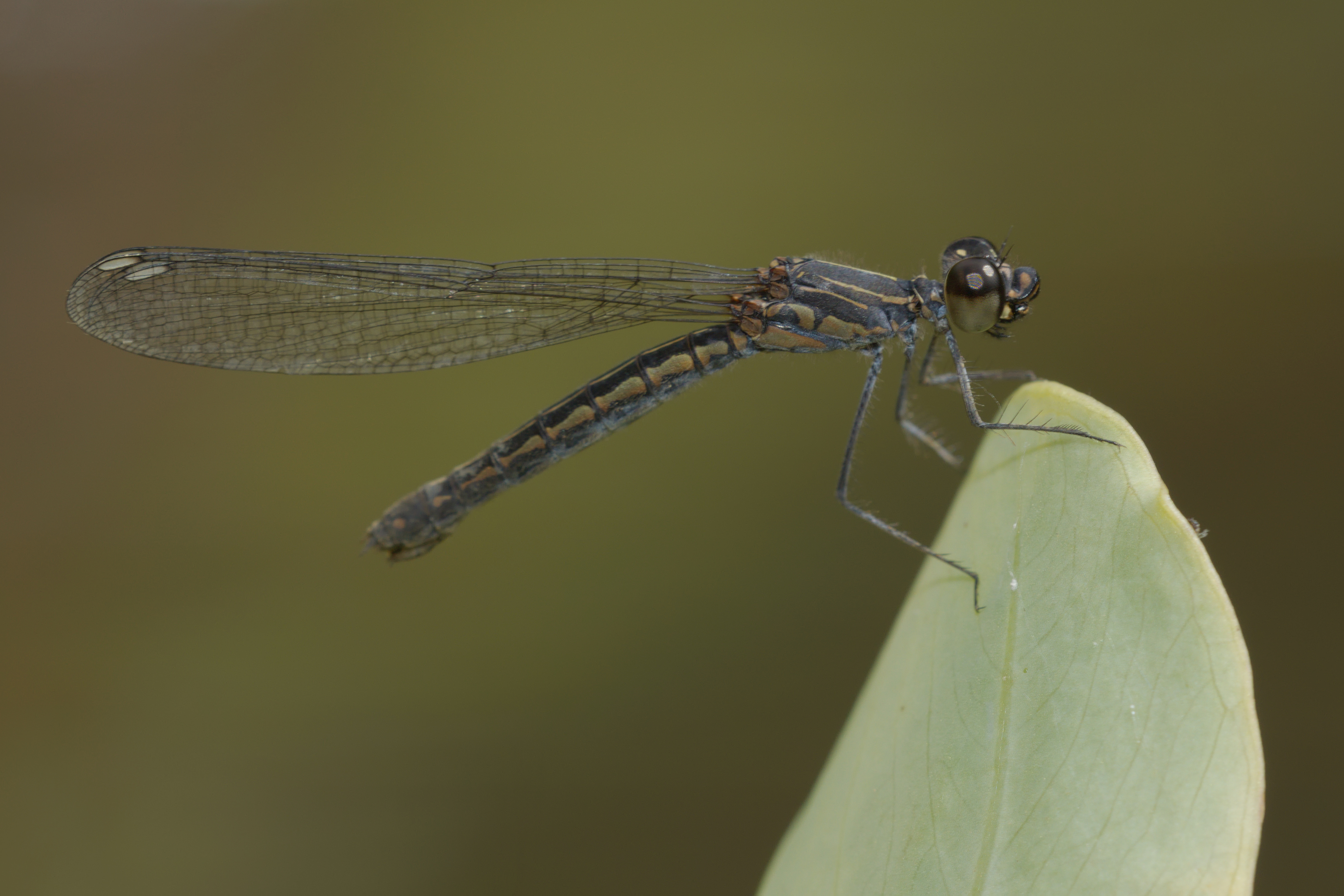
Libellago indica female

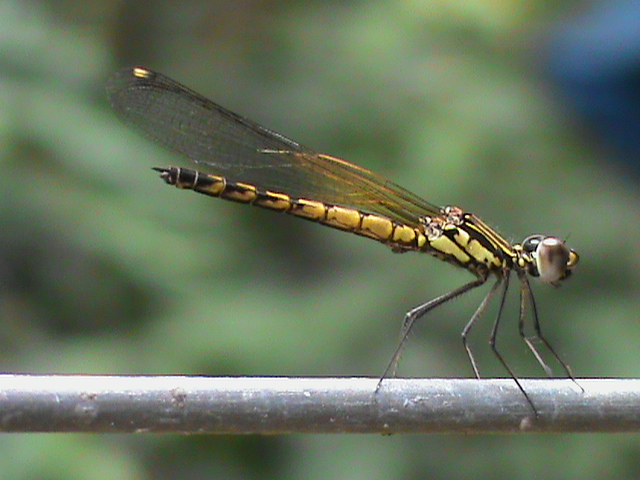
Libellago indica juvenile male

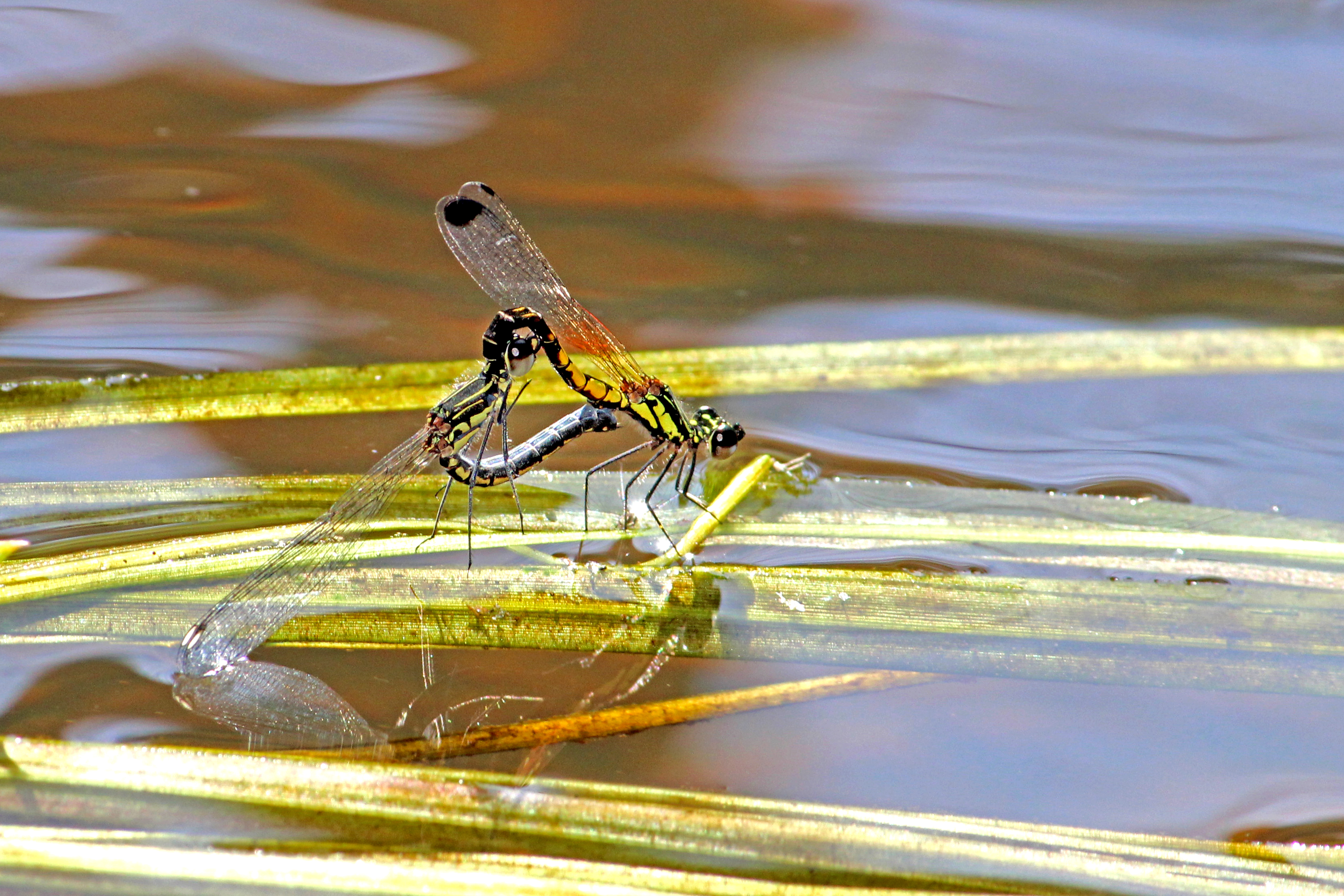
Libellago indica mating pair

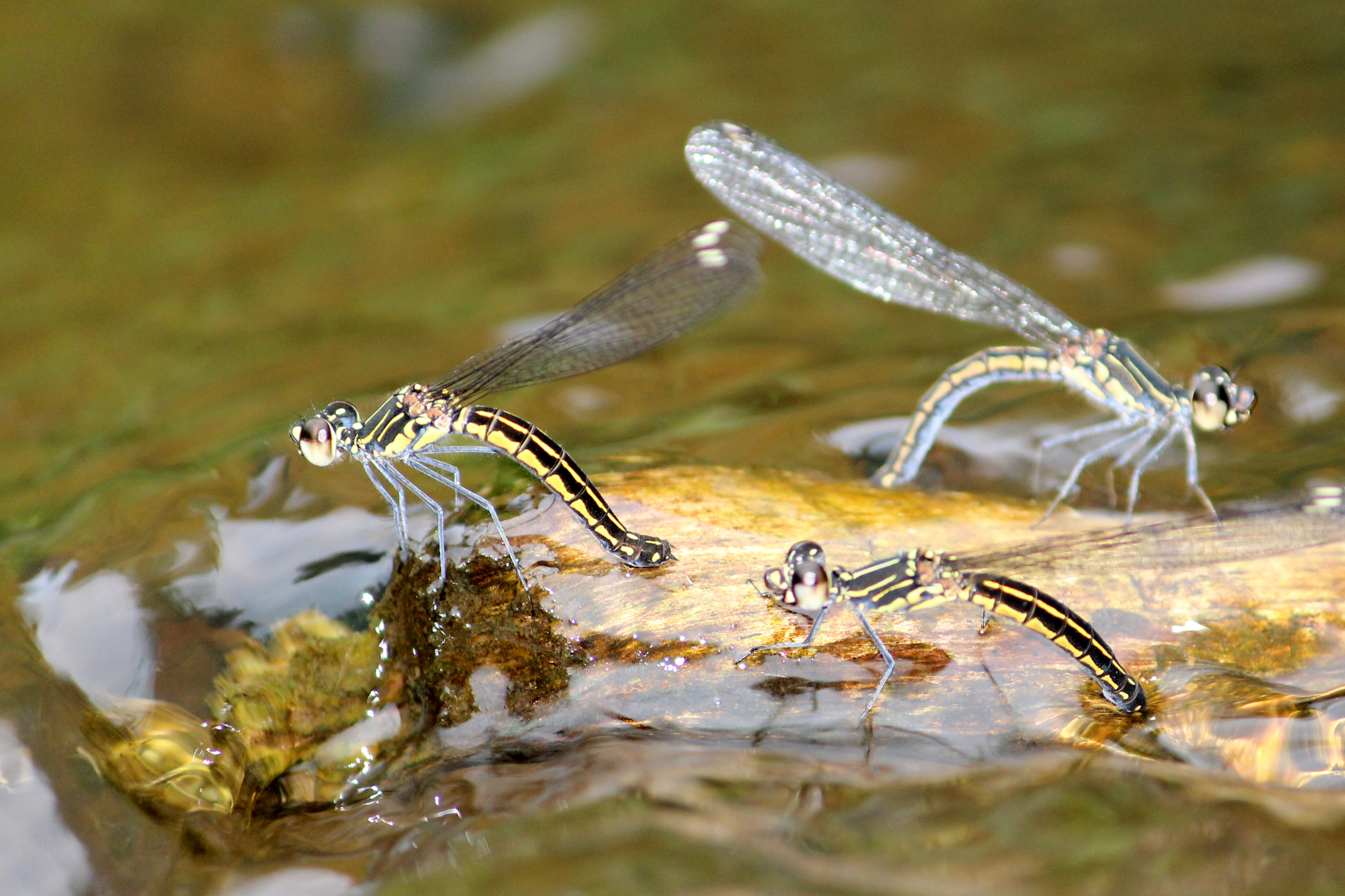
Libellago indica egg-laying

=== Family: Euphaeidae (Gossamerwinged damselflies) ===
==== Genus: Dysphaea ====
===== Species: Dysphaea ethela =====
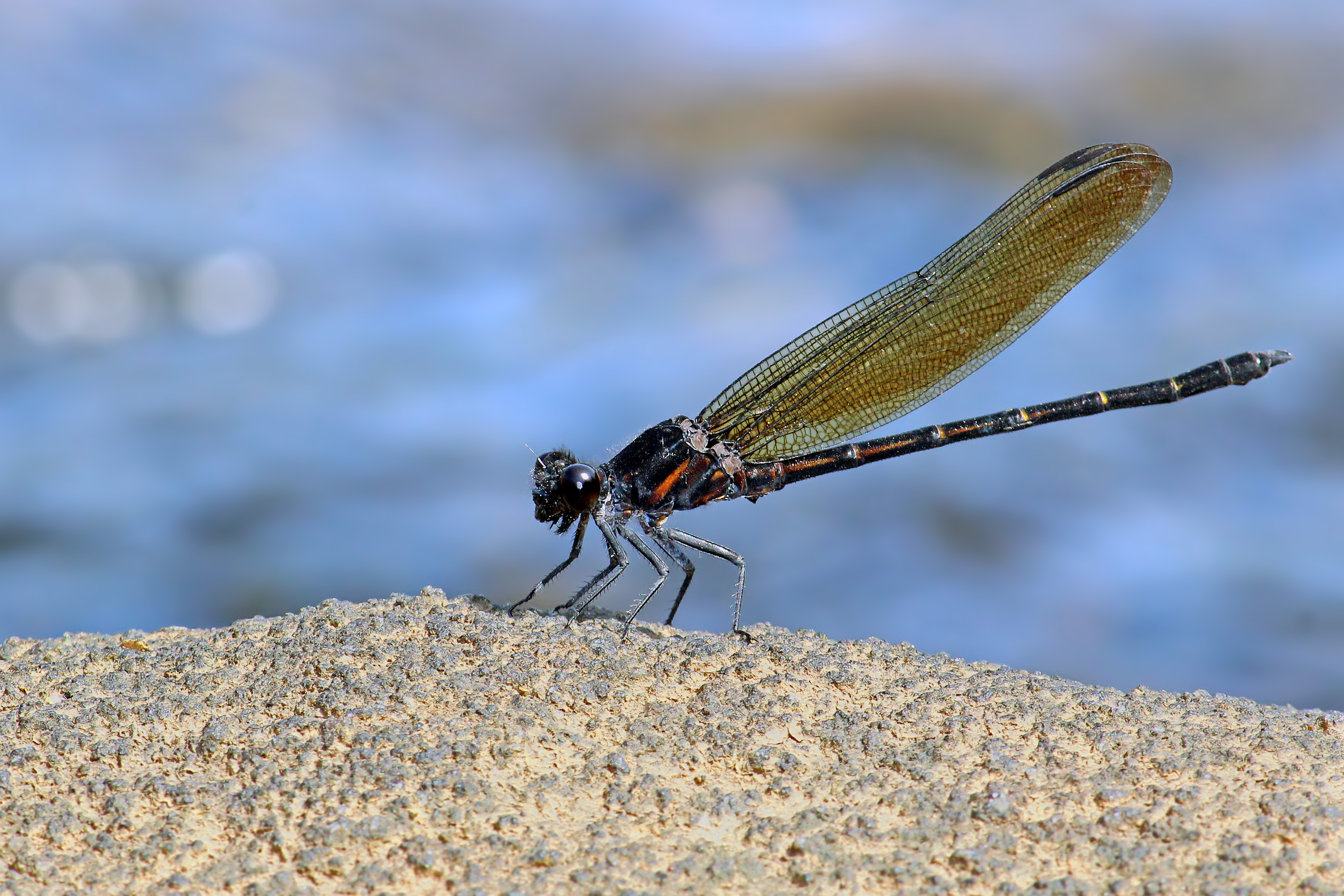
Dysphaea ethela male

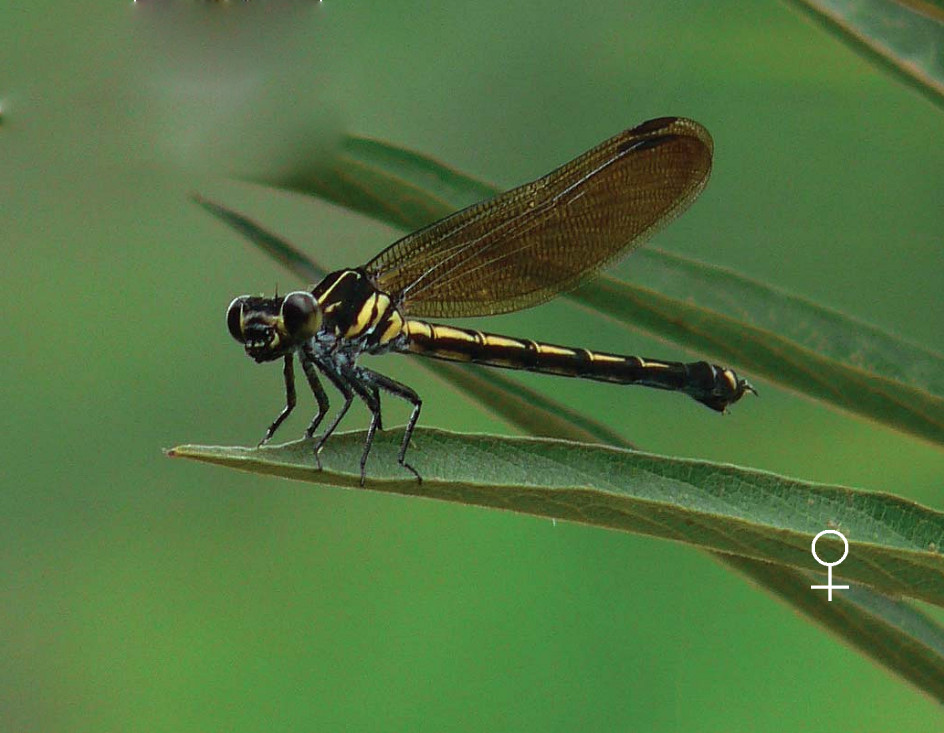
Dysphaea ethela female

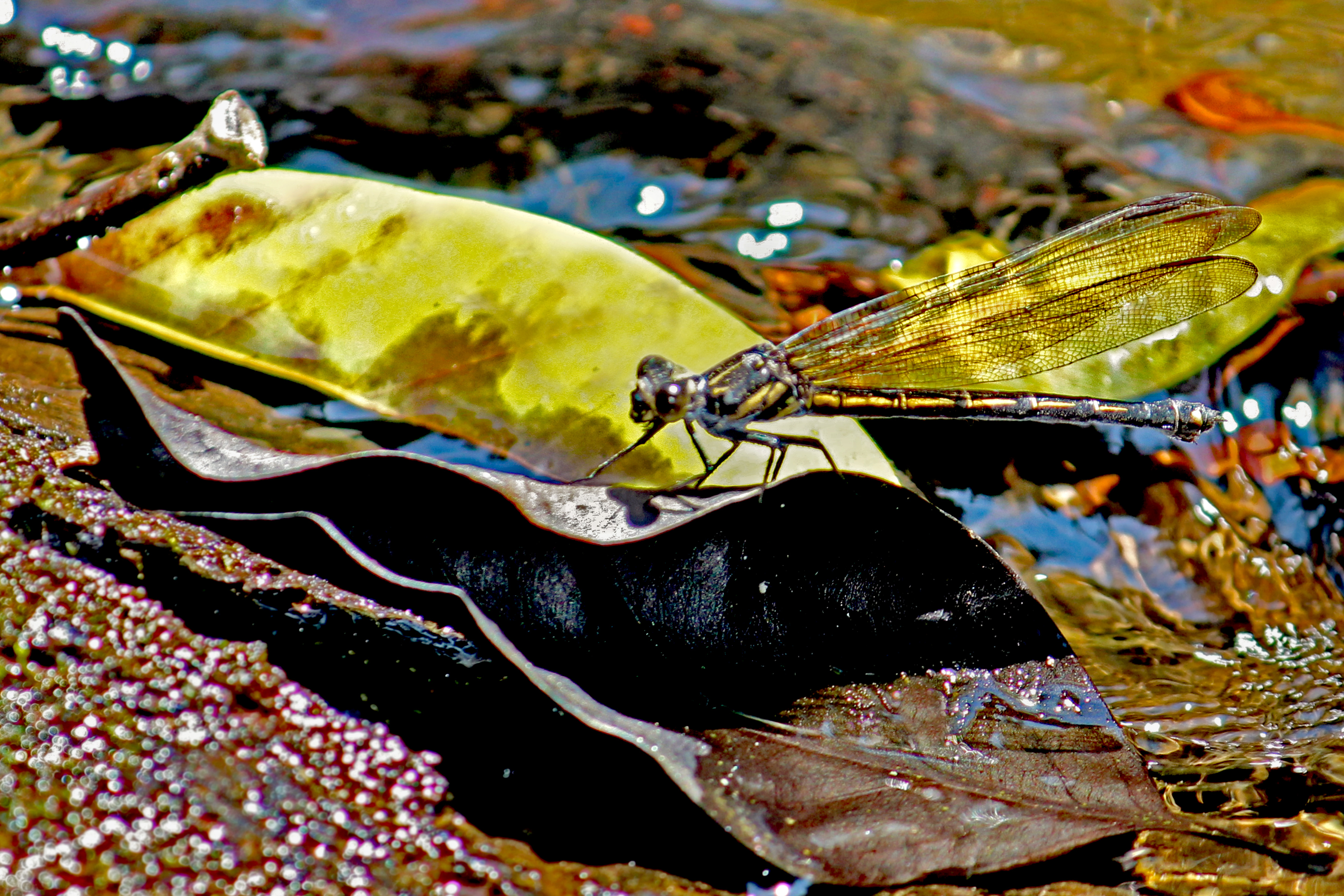
female

==== Genus: Euphaea ====
===== Species: Euphaea cardinalis =====
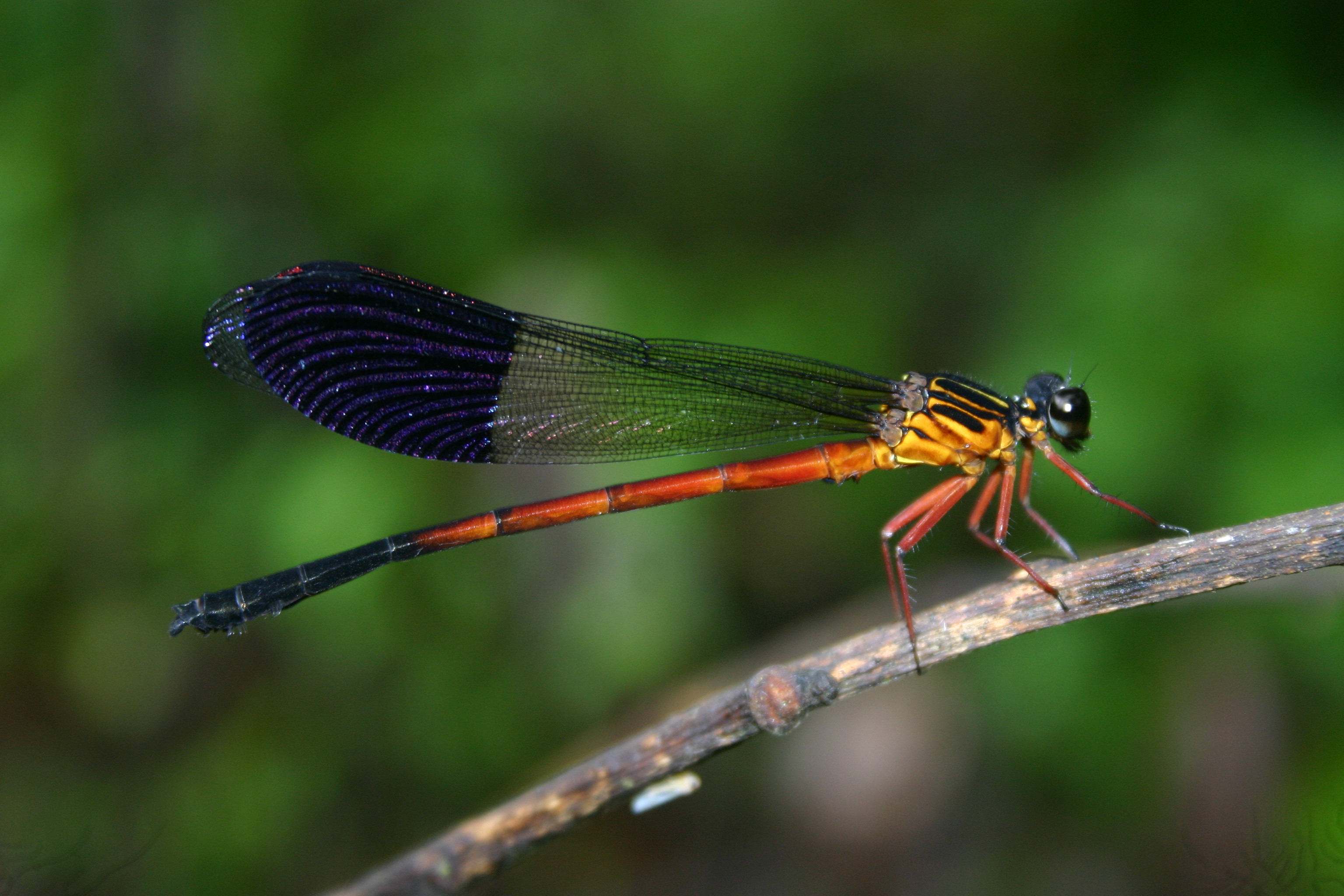
Euphaea cardinalis male

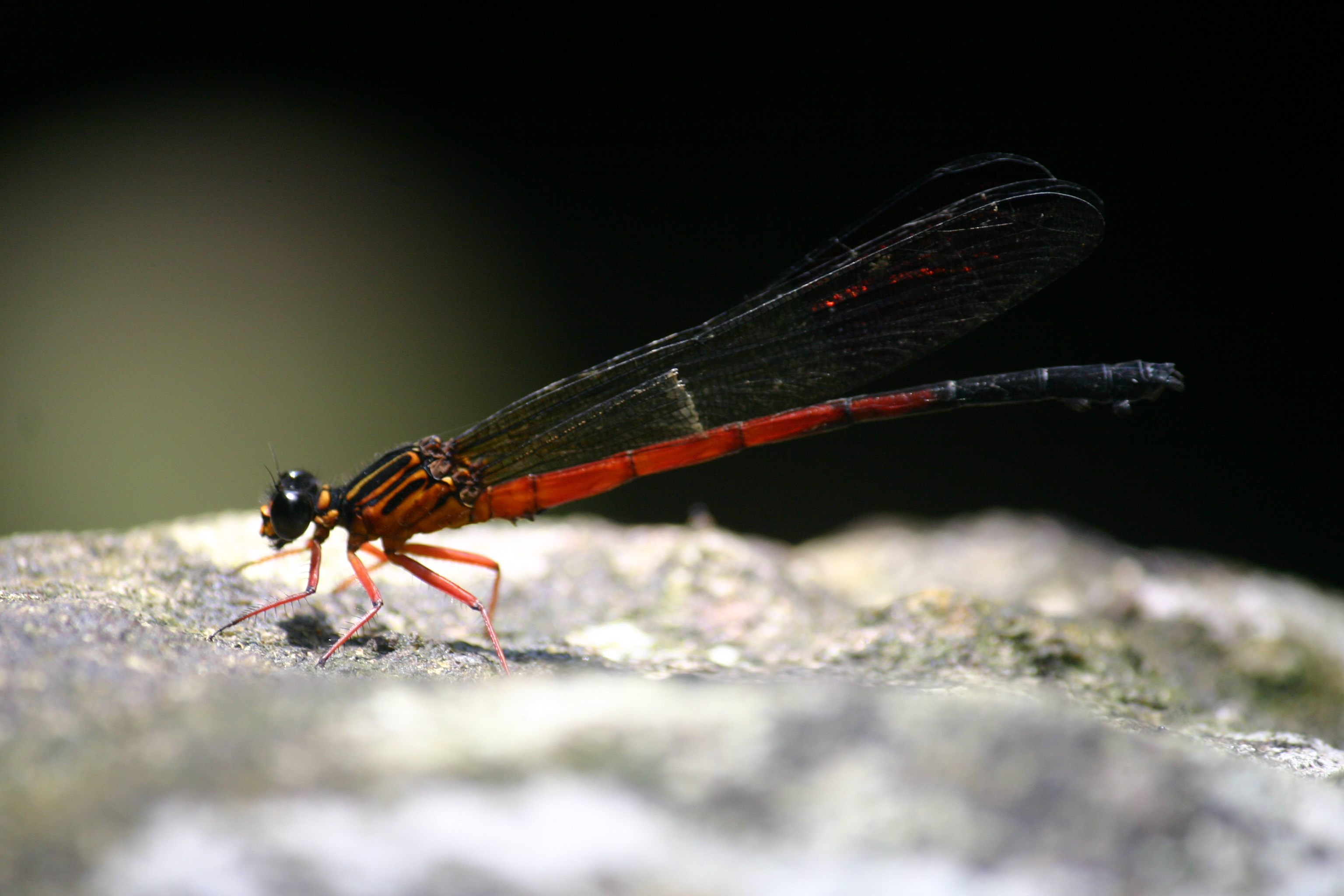
male

===== Species: Euphaea dispar =====
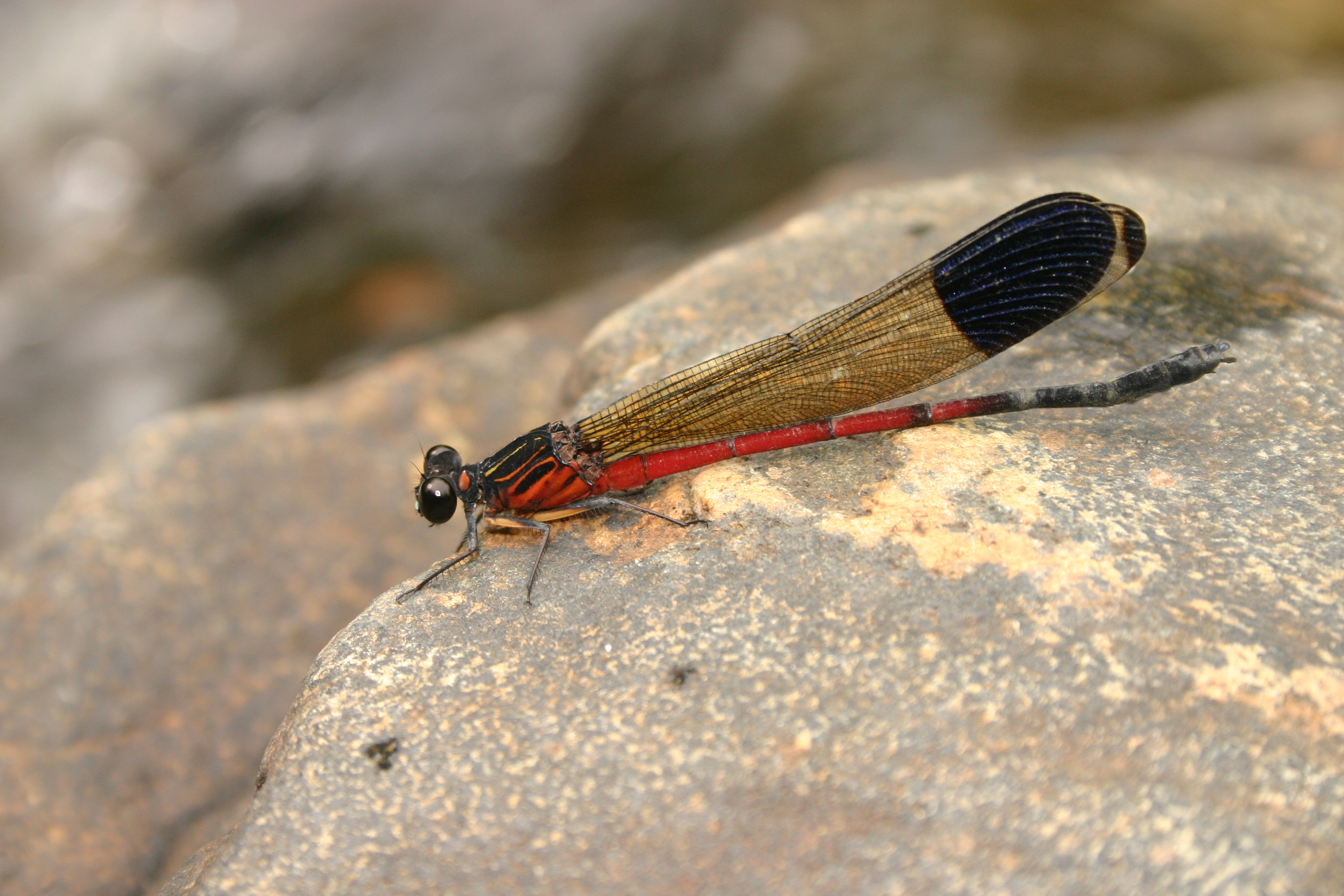
Euphaea dispar male

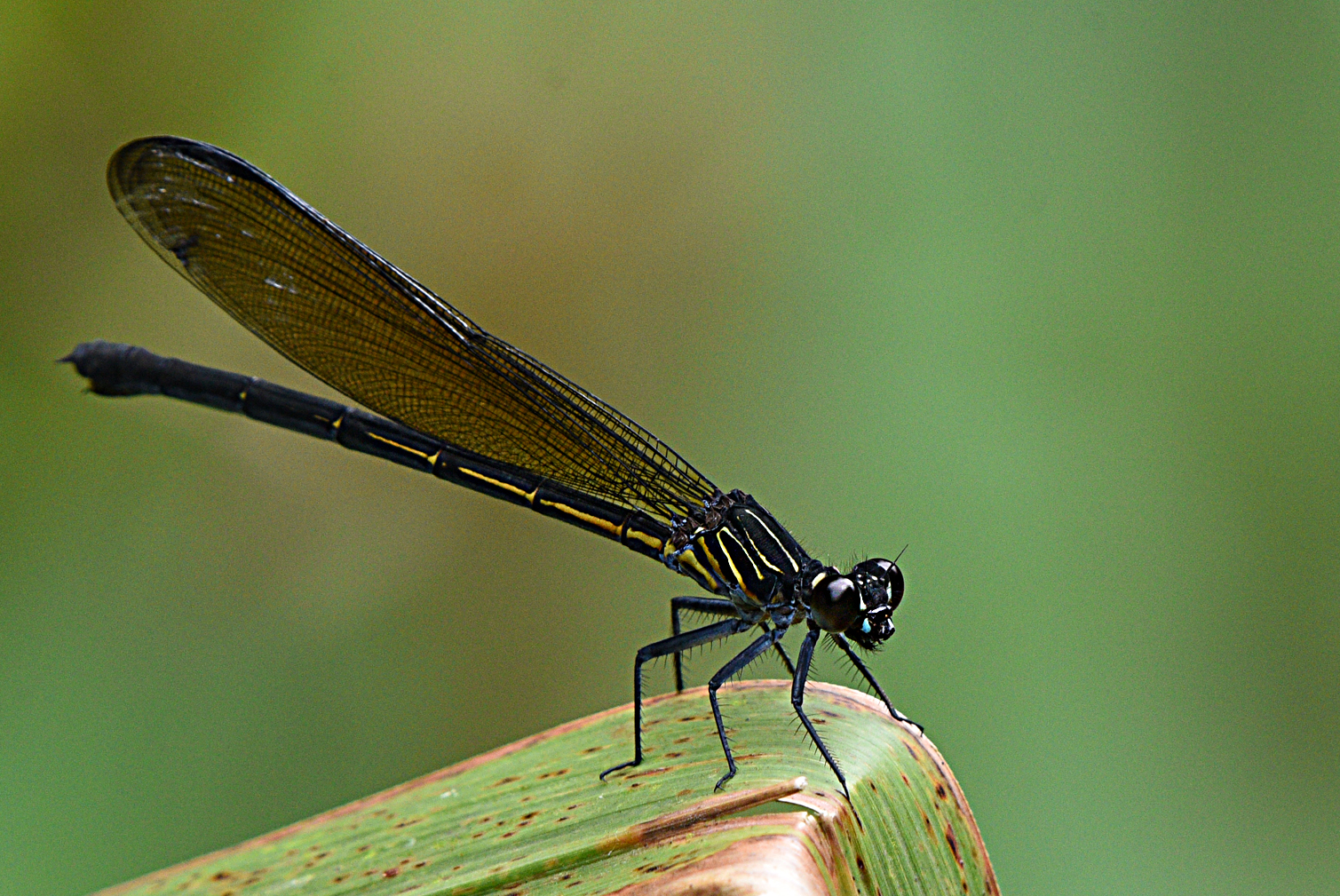
Female

===== Species: Euphaea fraseri =====
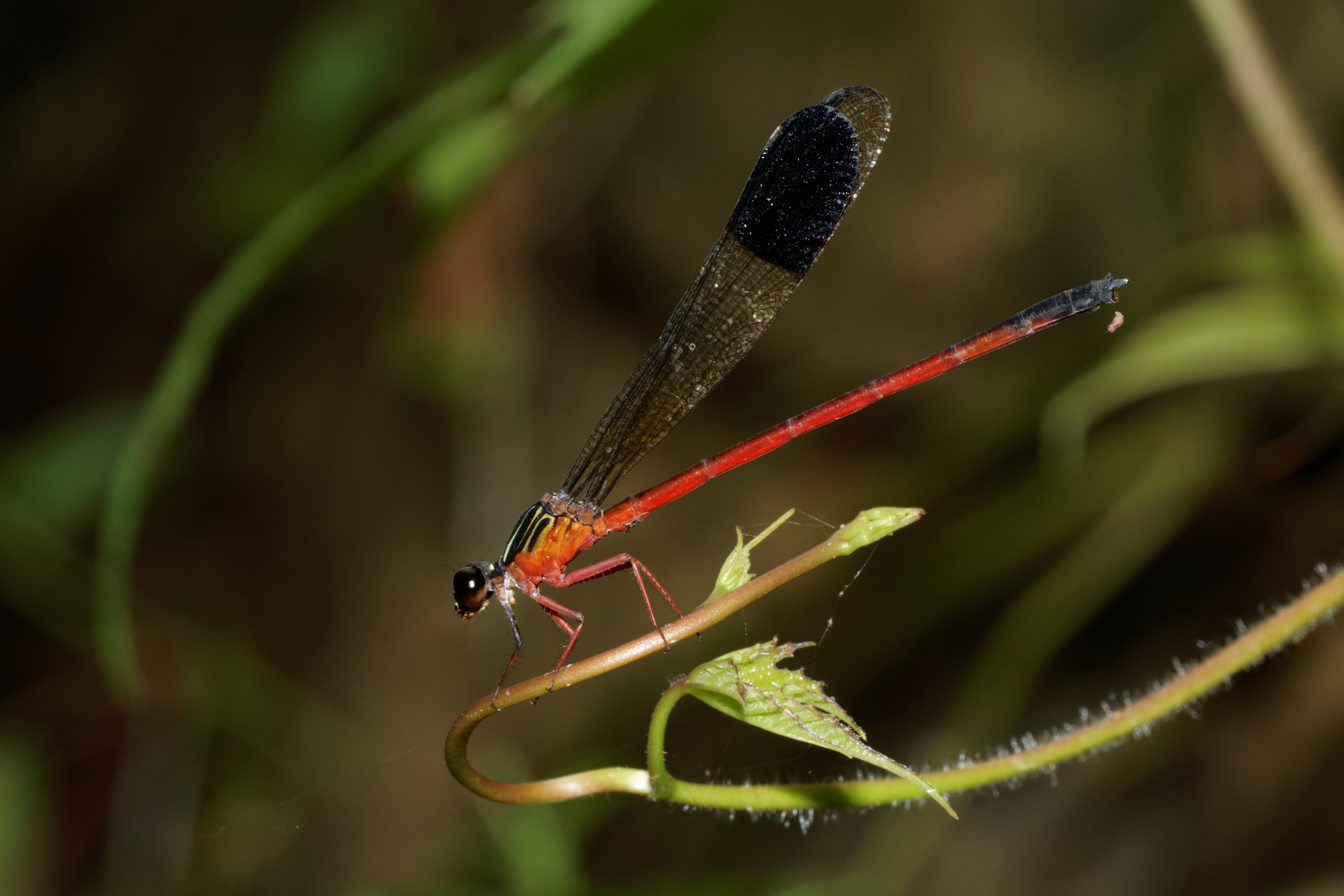
Euphaea fraseri male

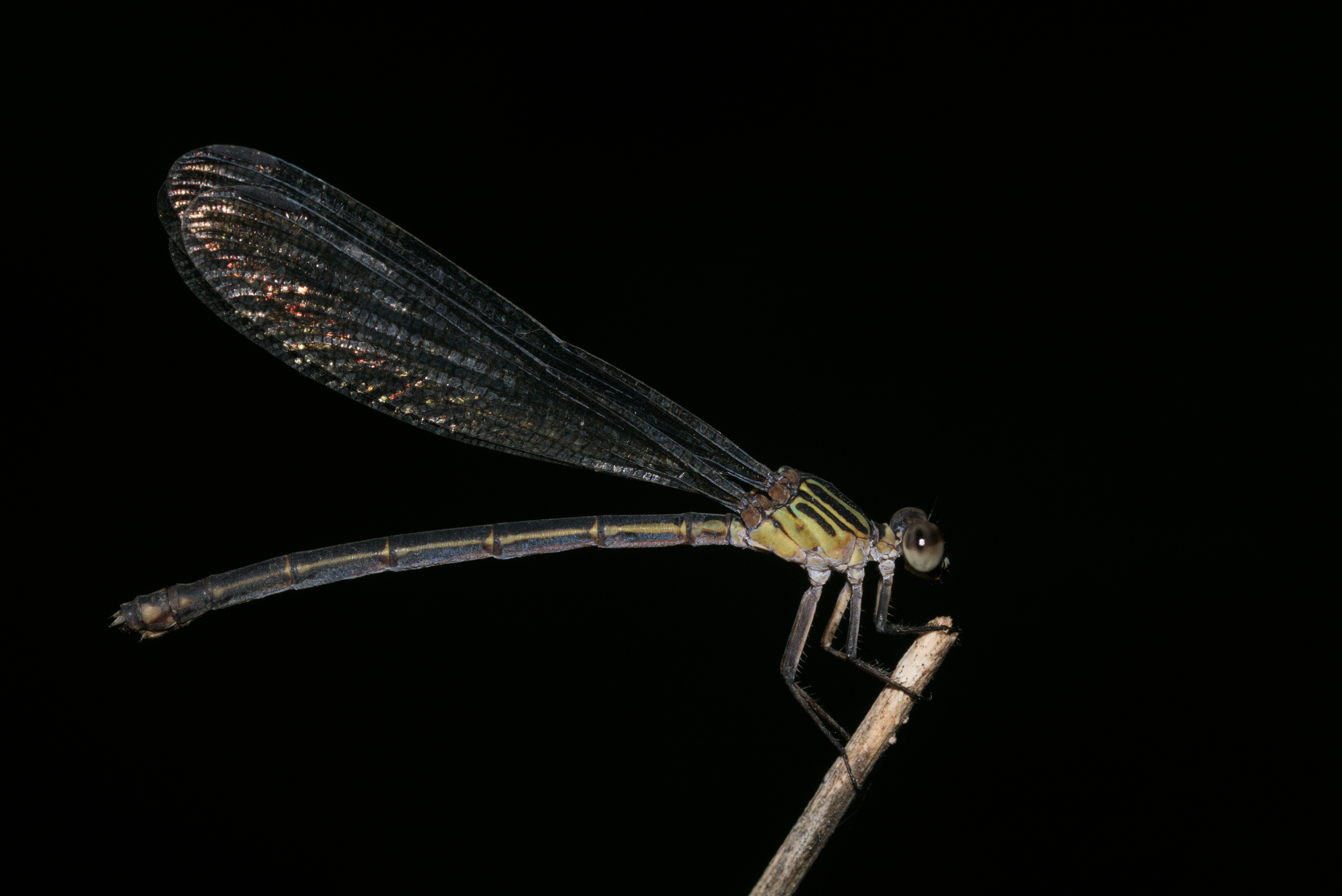
Euphaea fraseri female

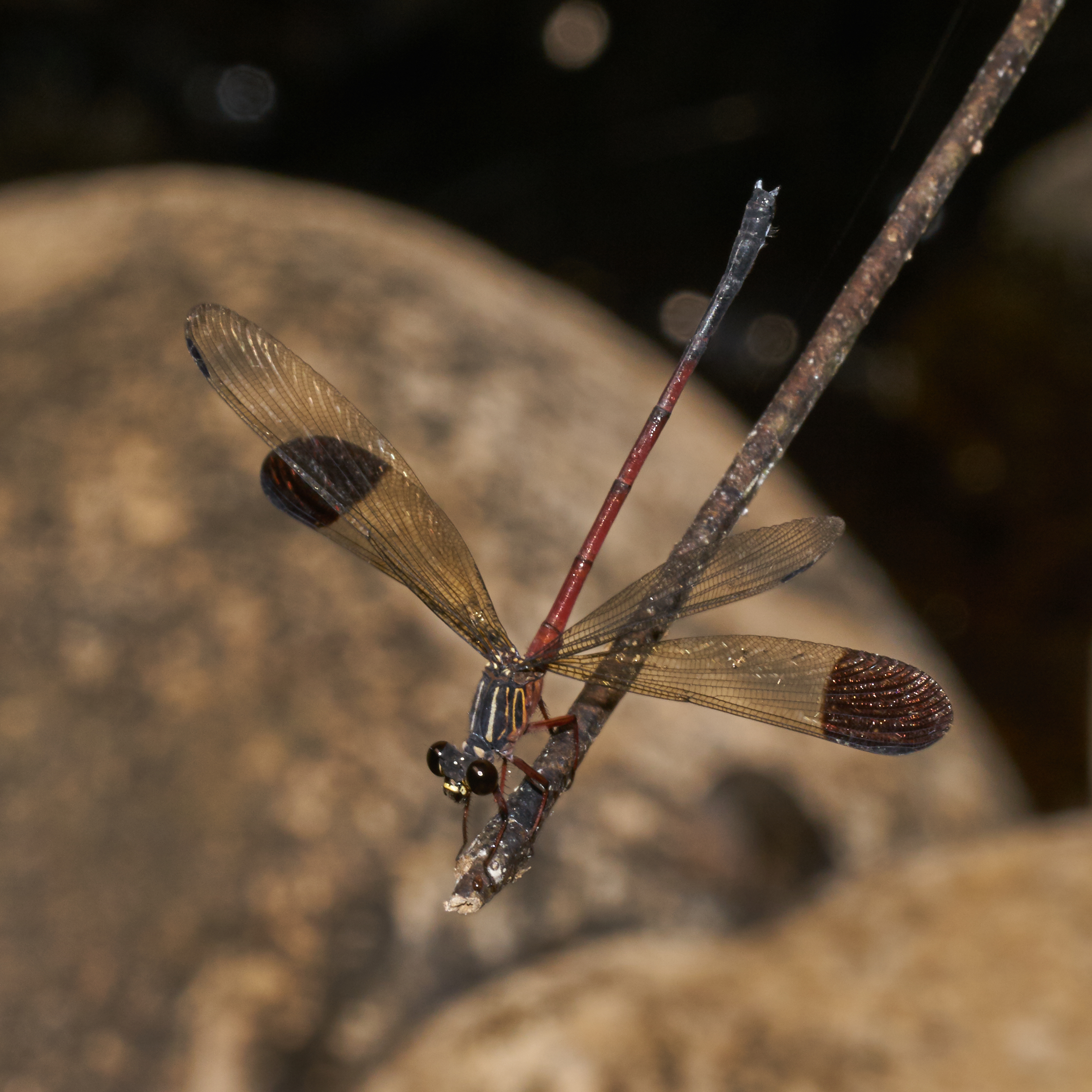
Euphaea fraseri male (wing flashing)

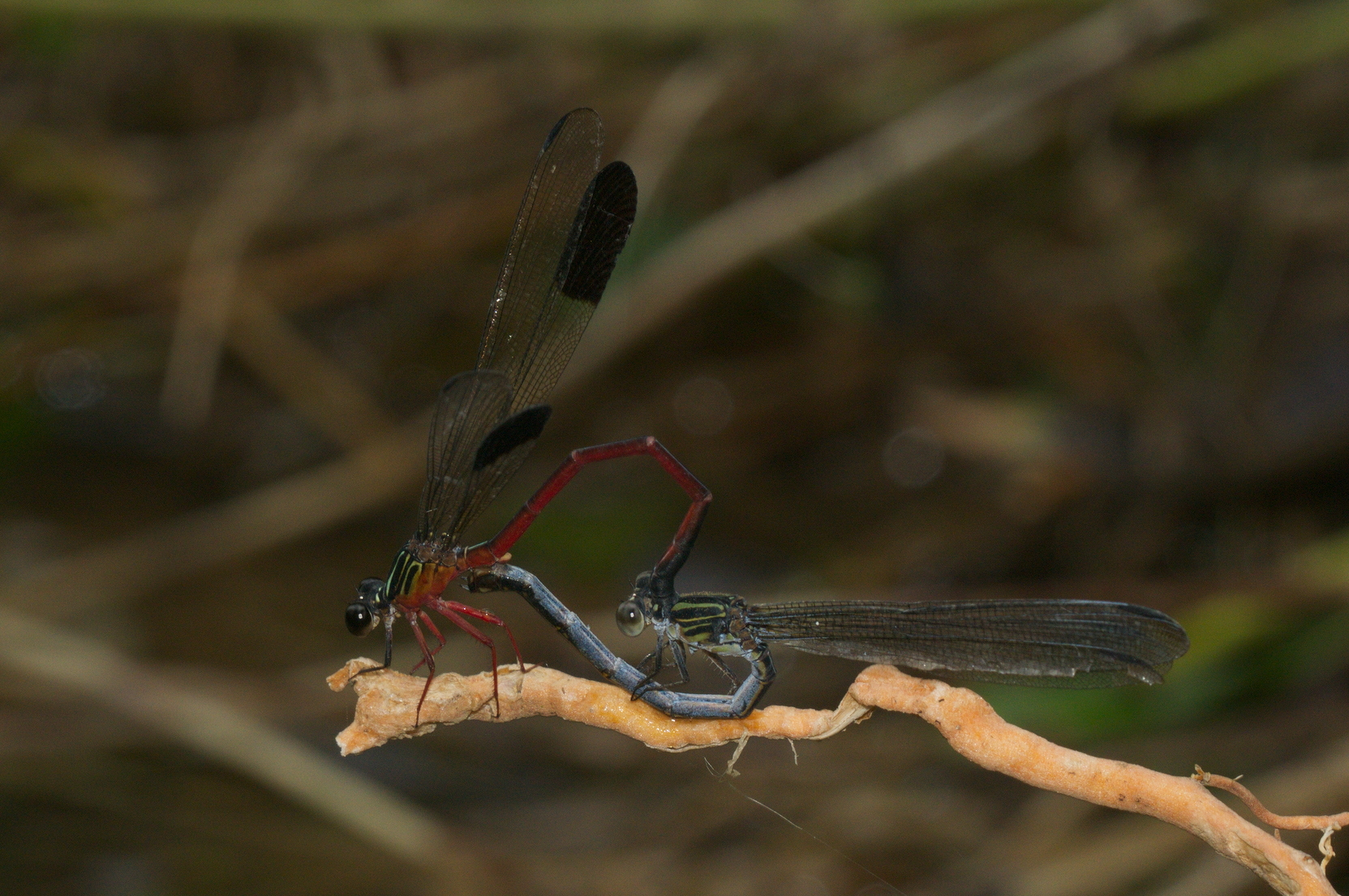
Euphaea fraseri mating pair

===== Species: Euphaea pseudodispar =====
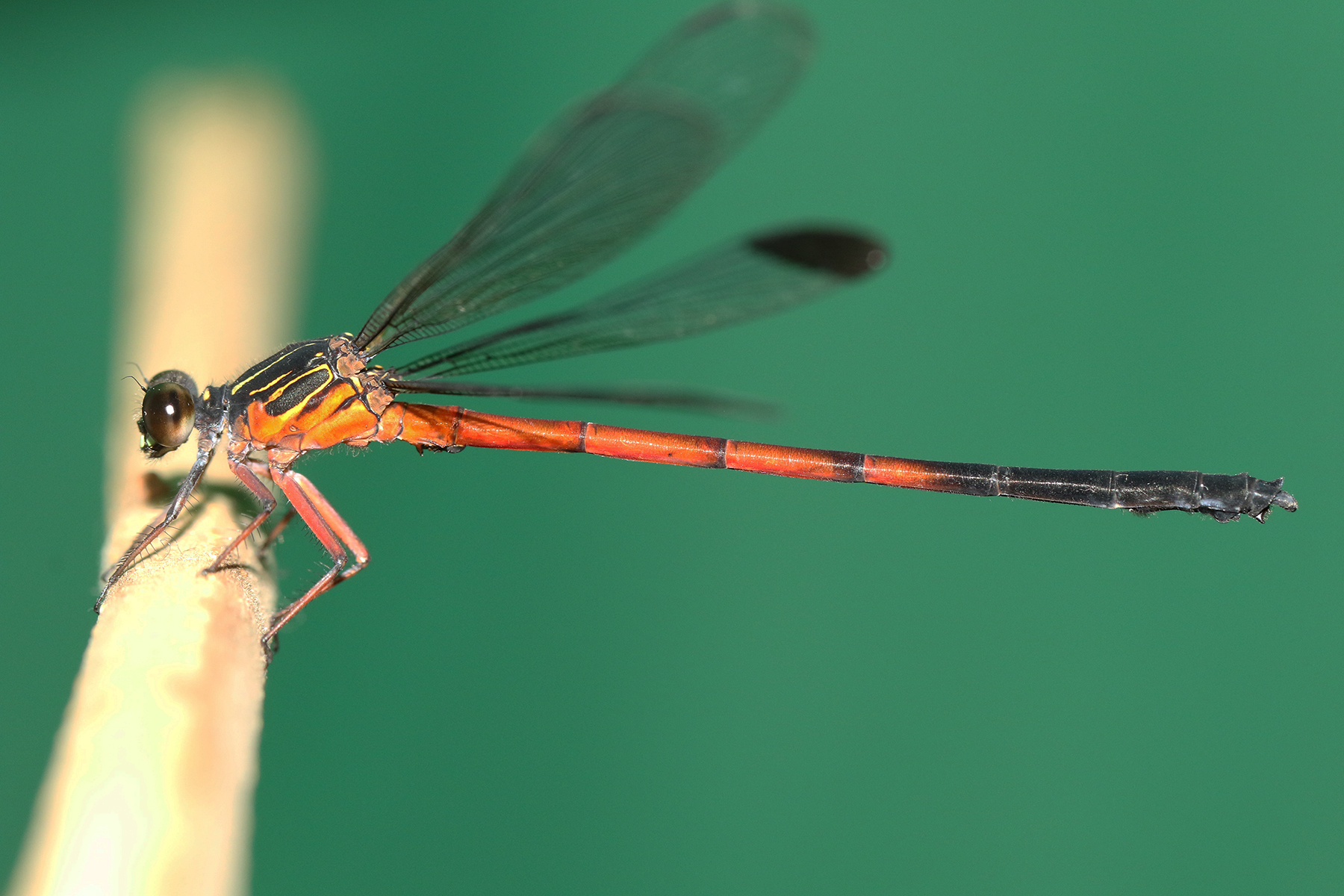
male

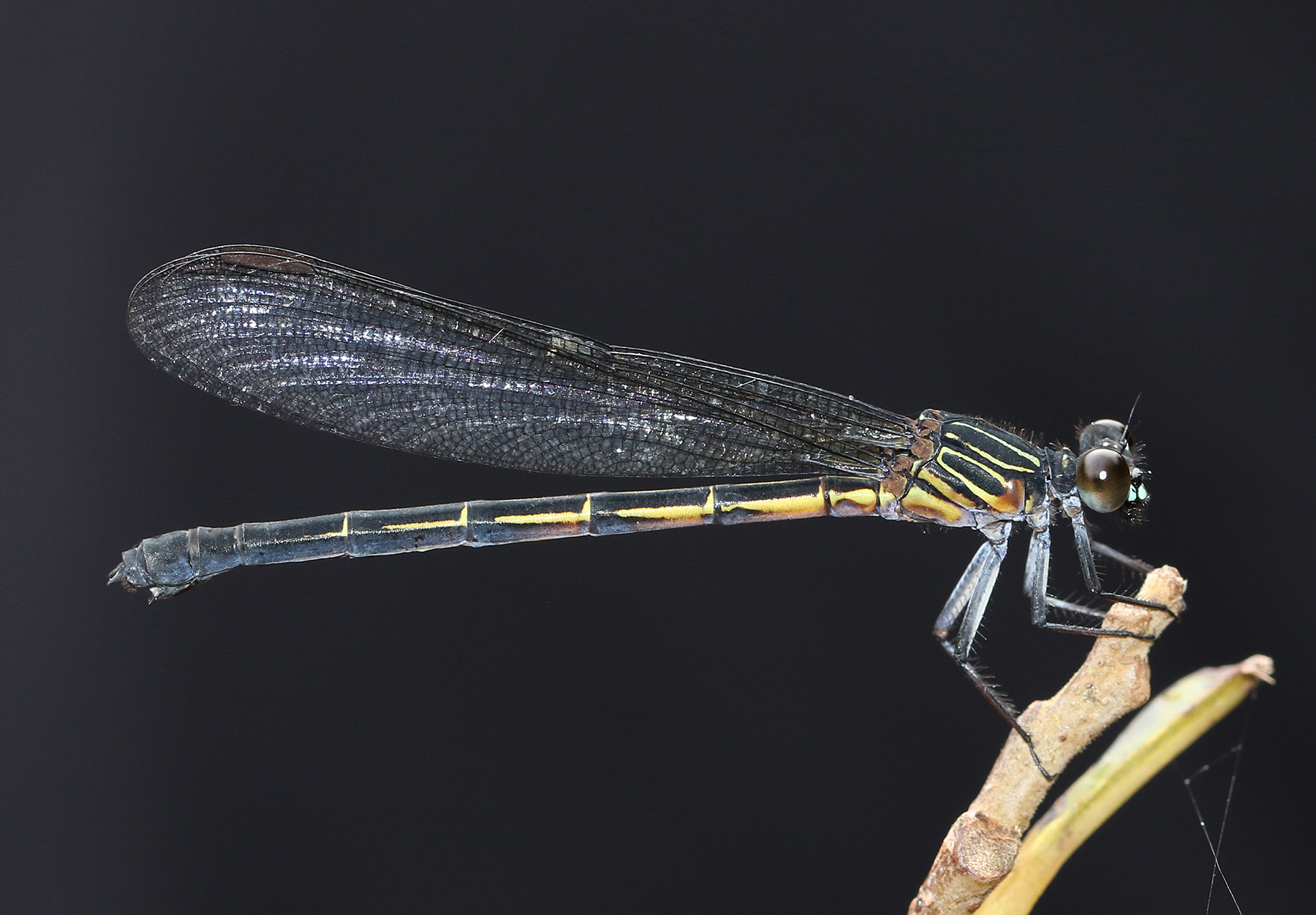
female

===== Species: Euphaea wayanadensis =====
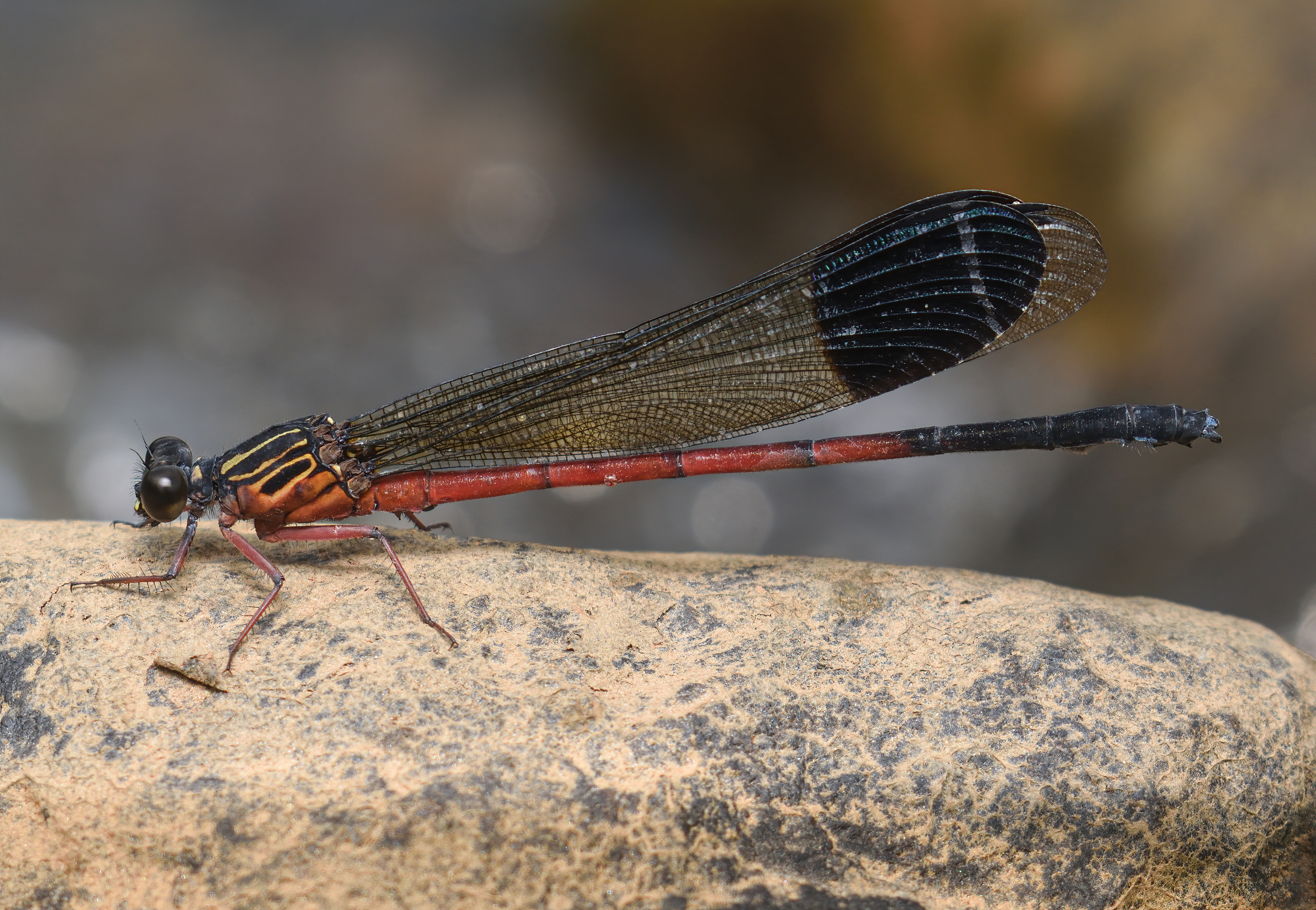
male

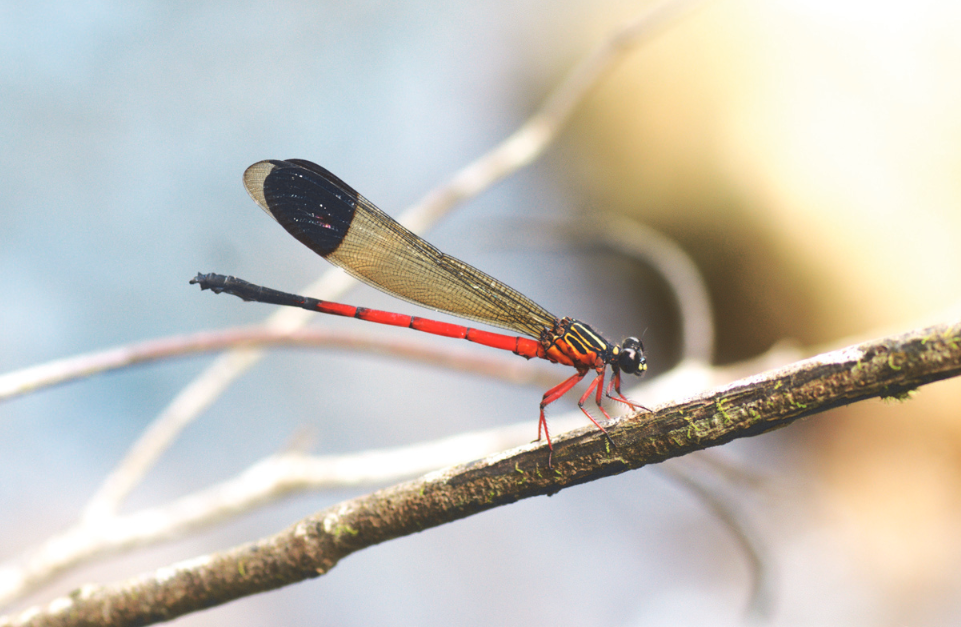
male

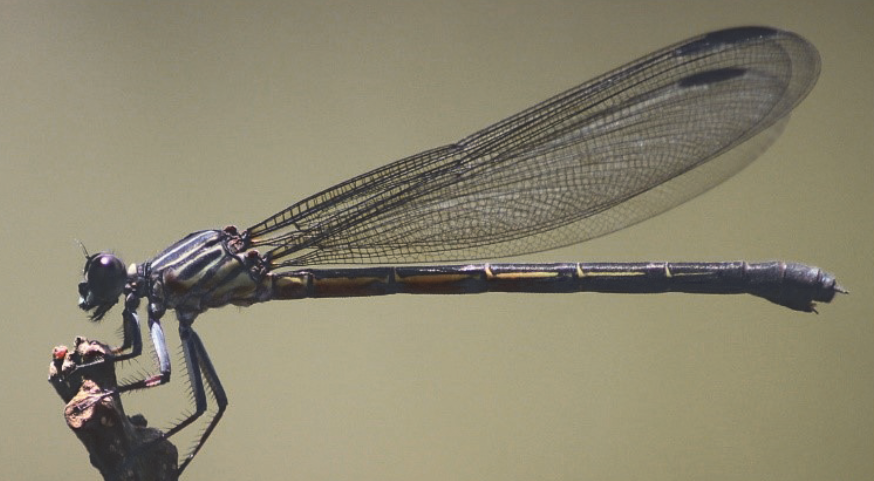
female

=== Family: Platycnemididae (White-legged damselflies) ===
==== Genus: Caconeura ====
===== Species: Caconeura gomphoides =====
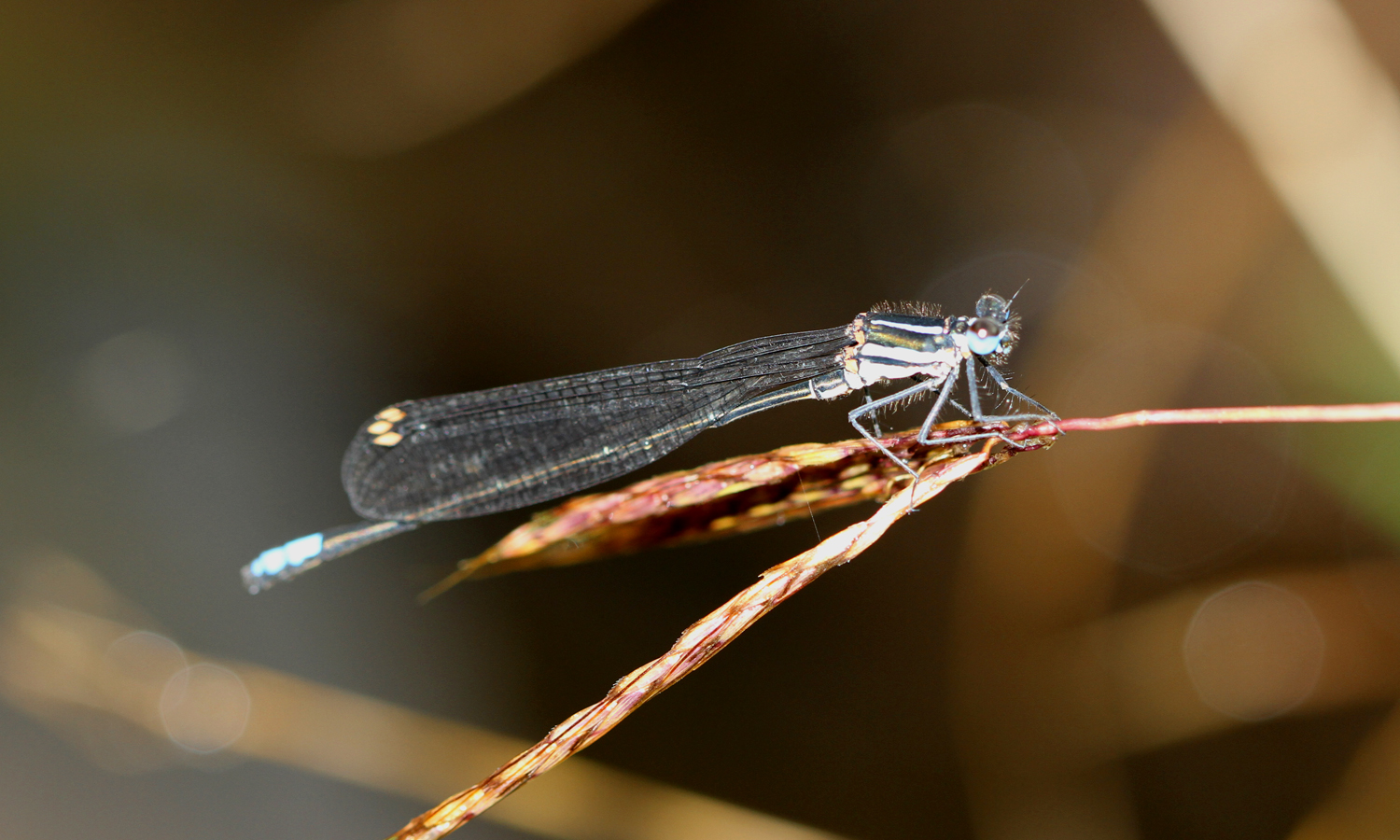
Male

===== Species: Caconeura ramburi =====
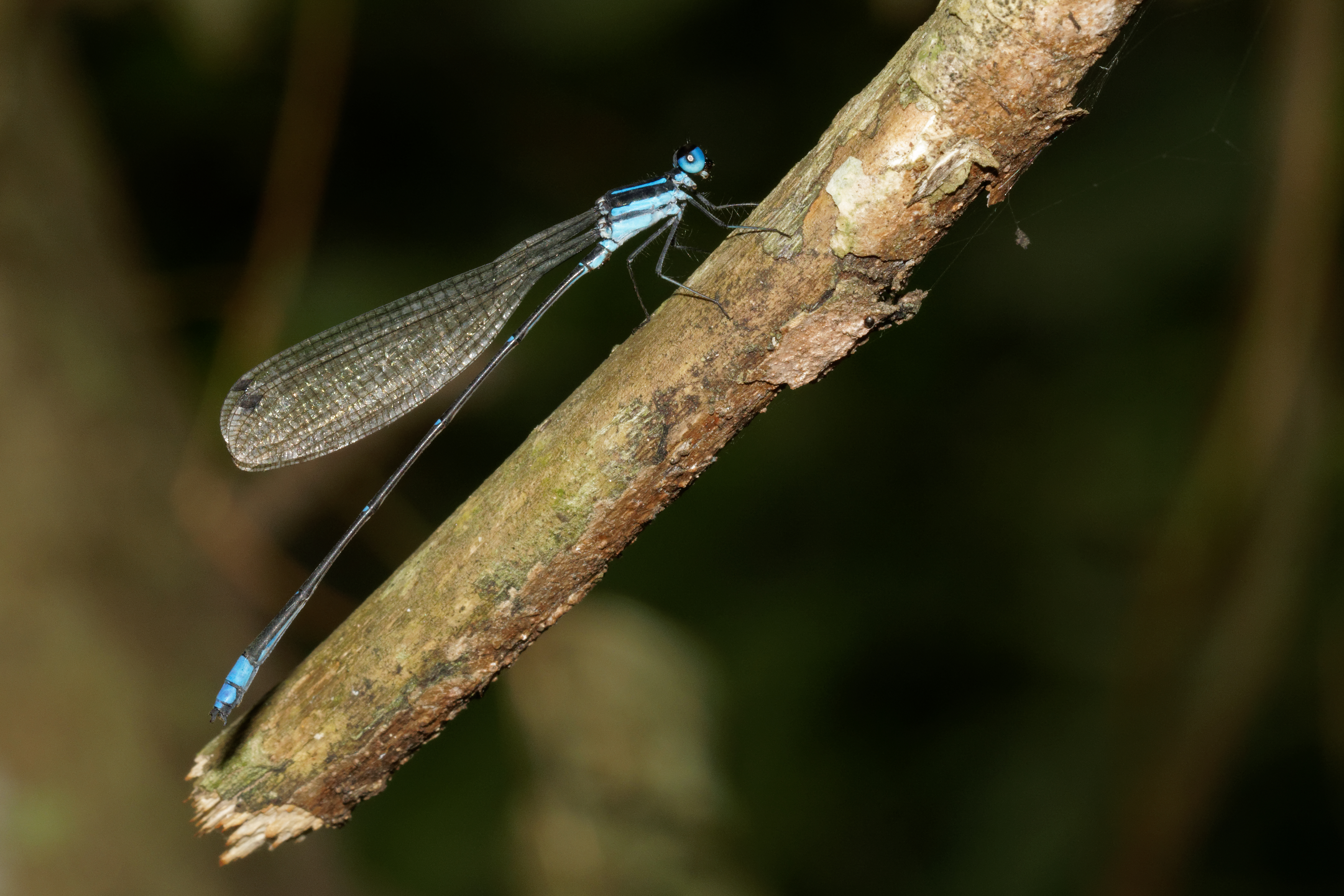
Caconeura ramburi male

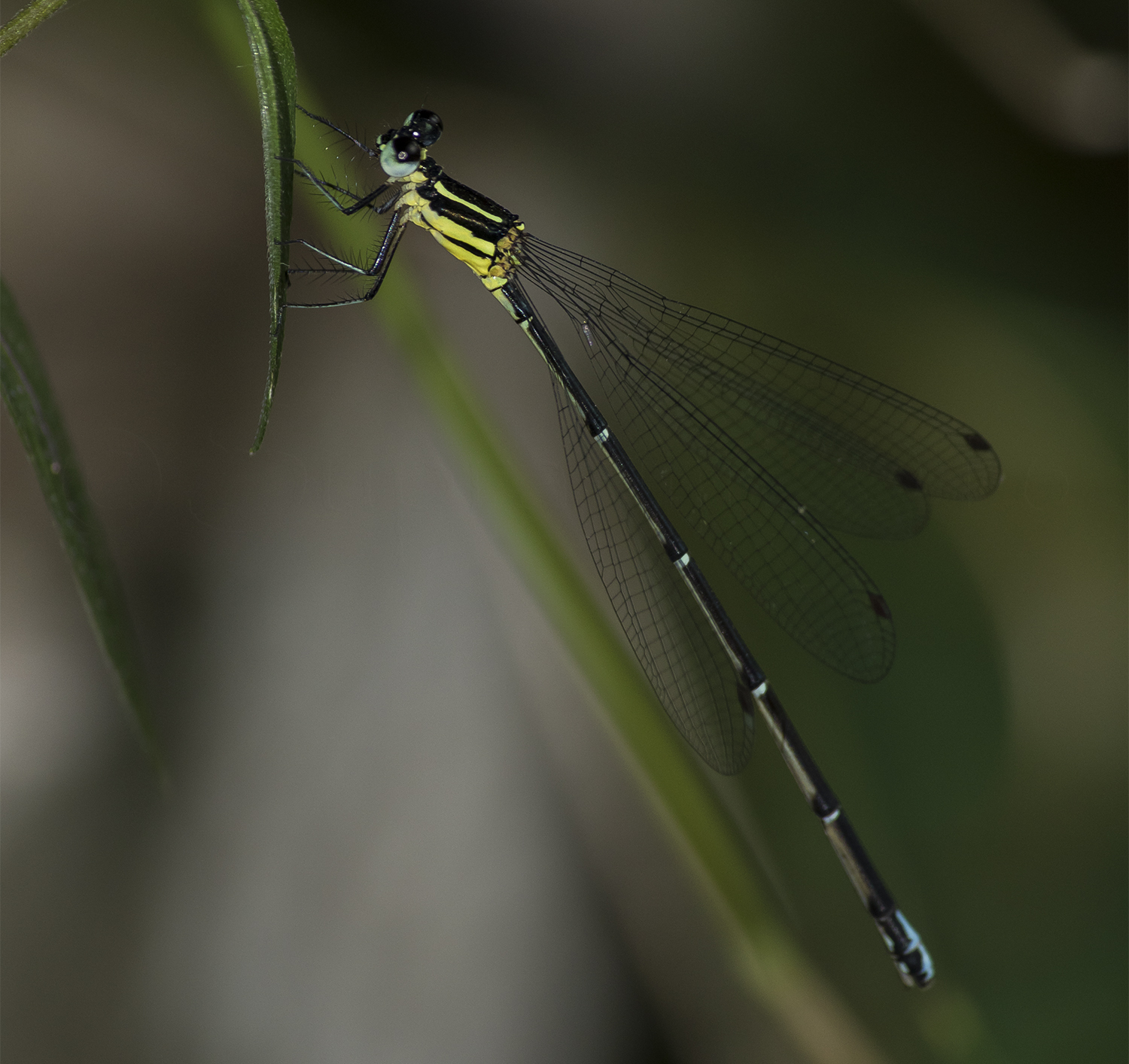
Caconeura ramburi female

===== Species: Caconeura risi =====
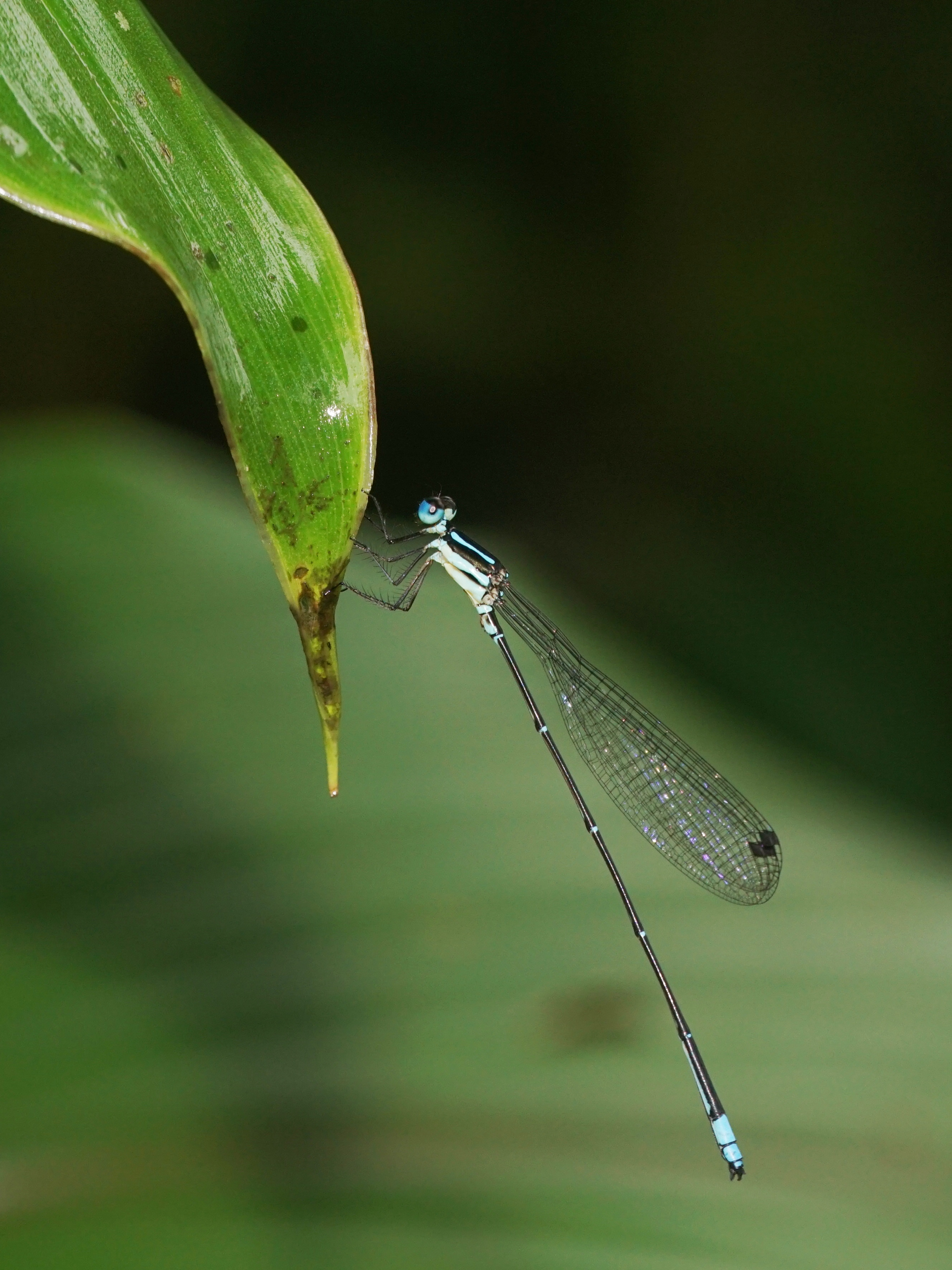
male

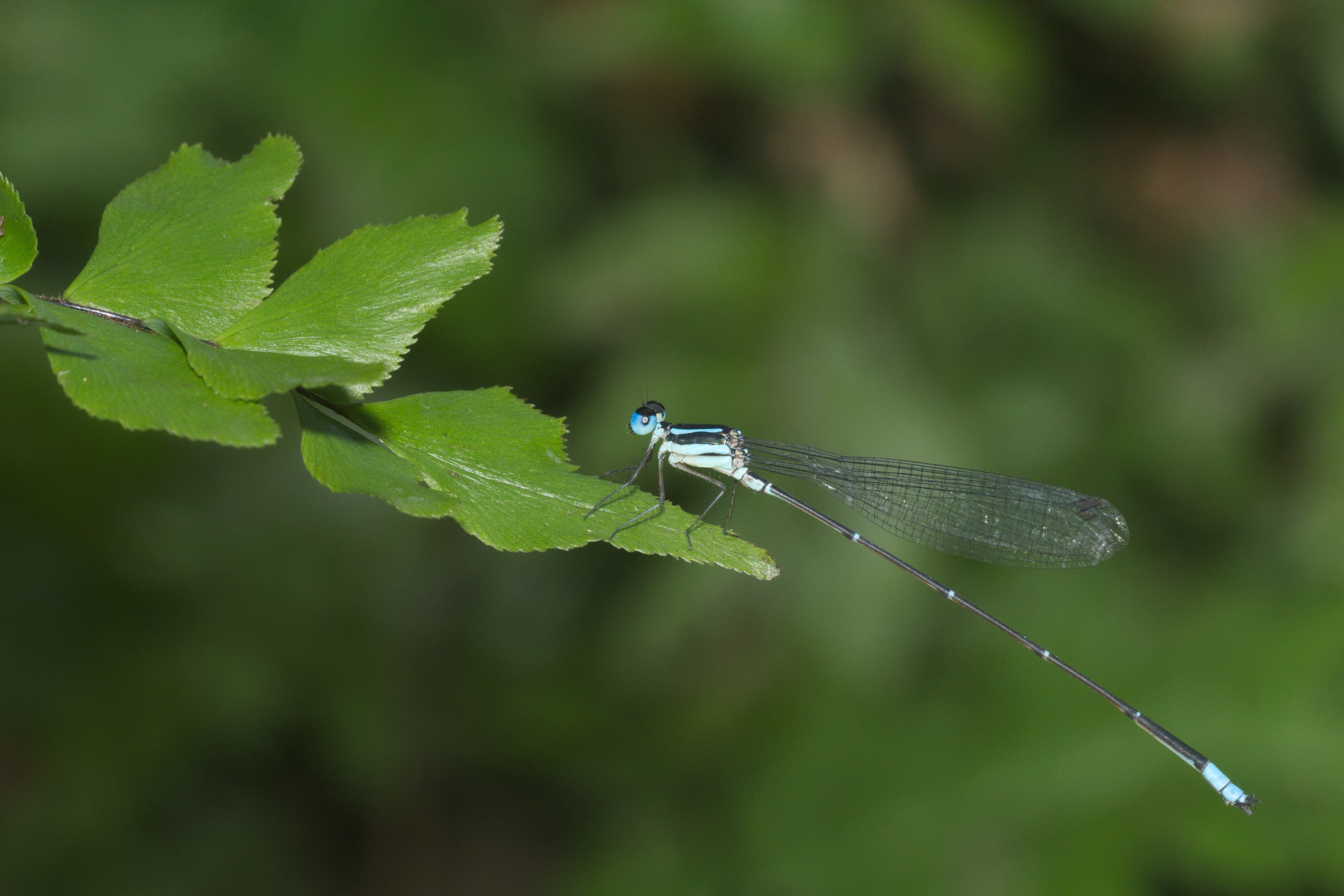
male

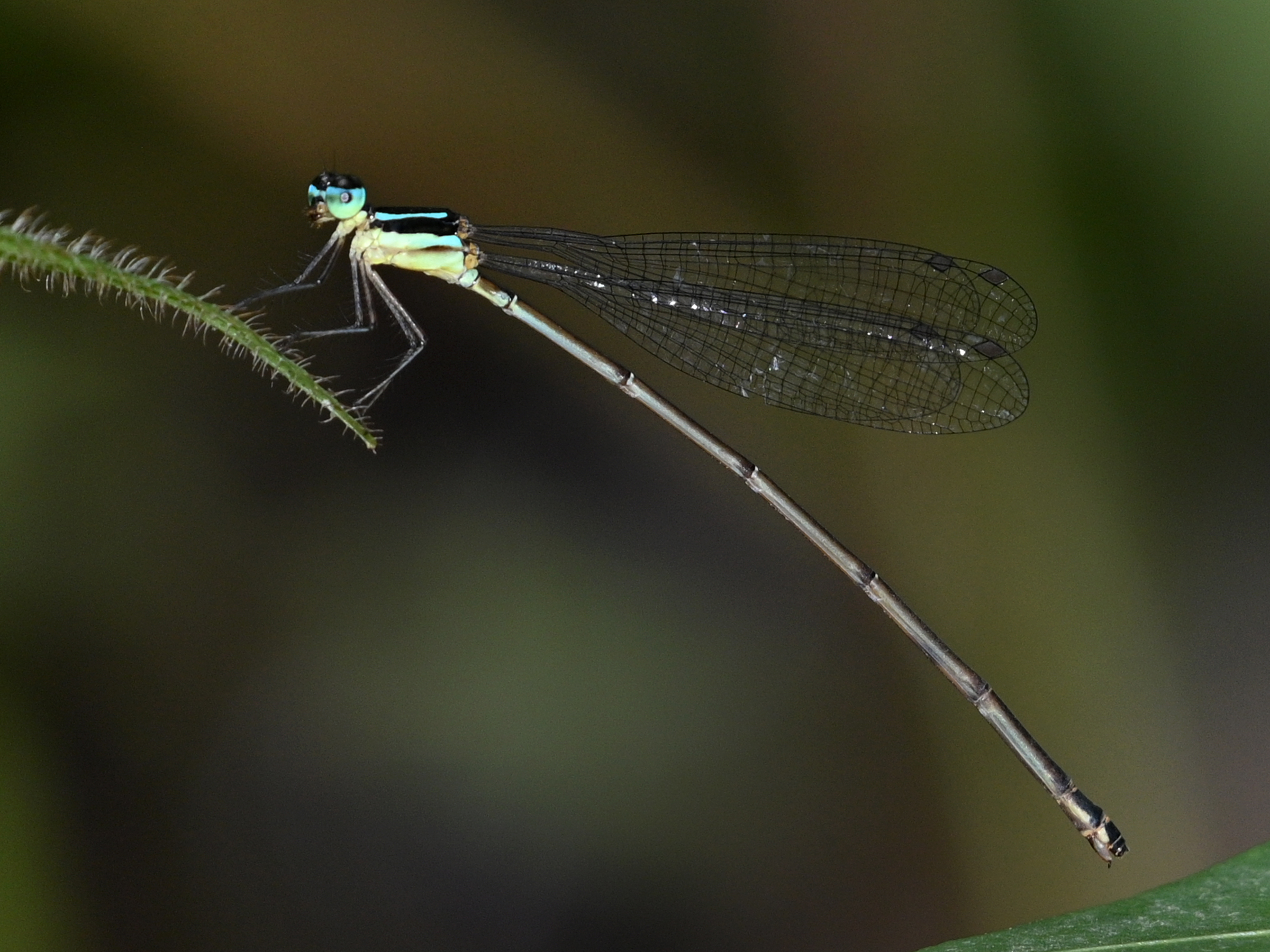
Caconeura risi female

==== Genus: Copera ====
===== Species: Copera marginipes =====
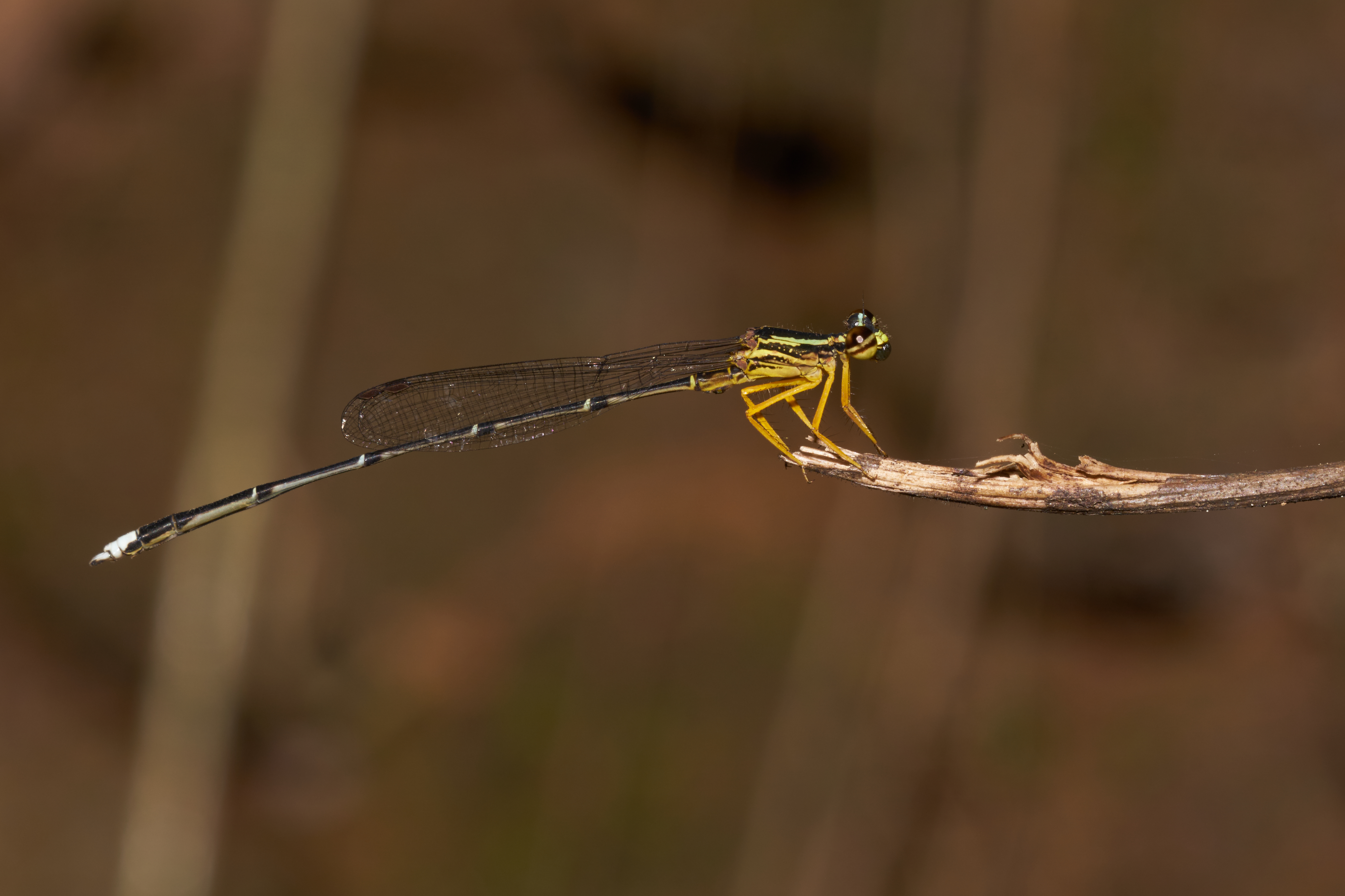
Copera marginipes male

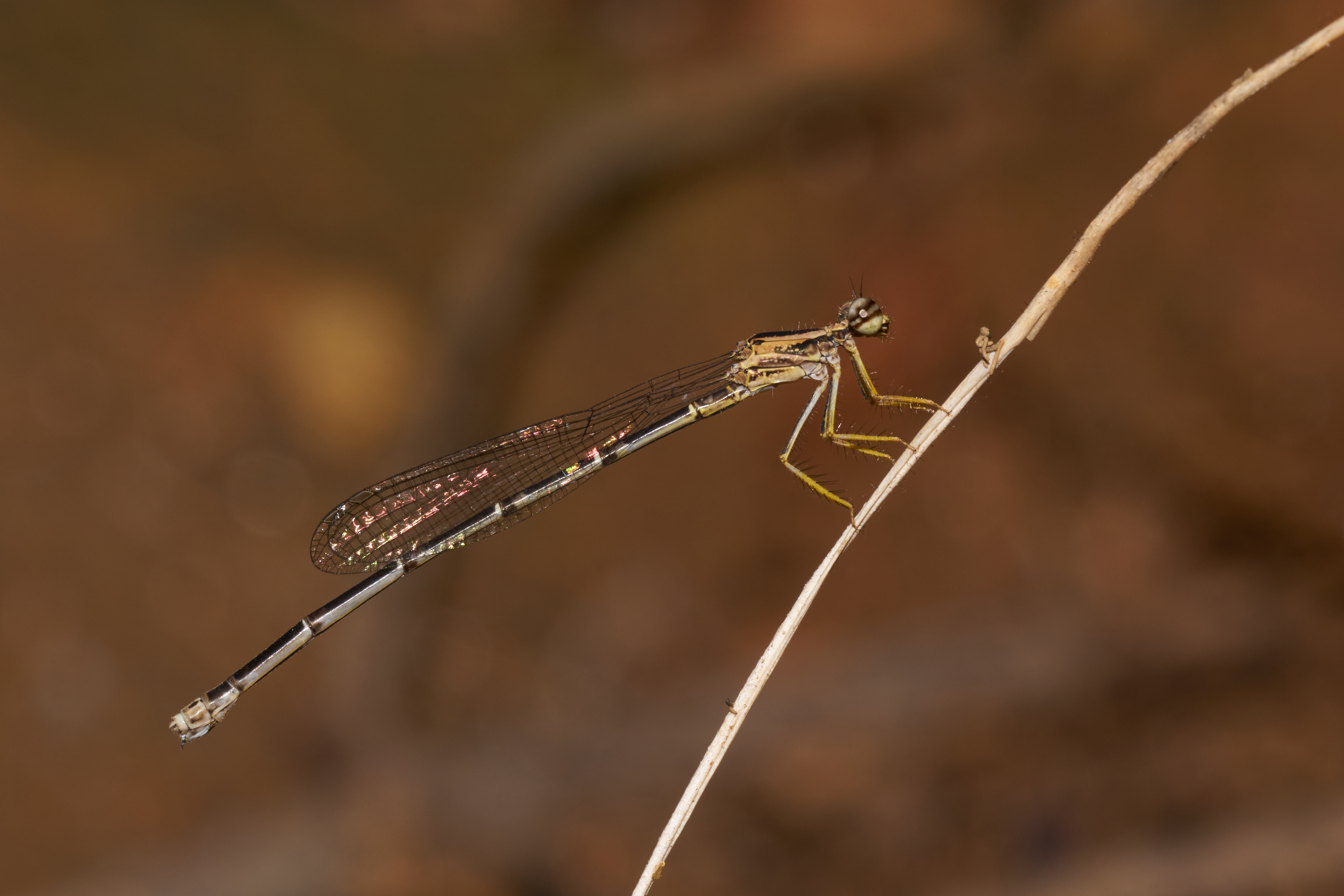
Copera marginipes female

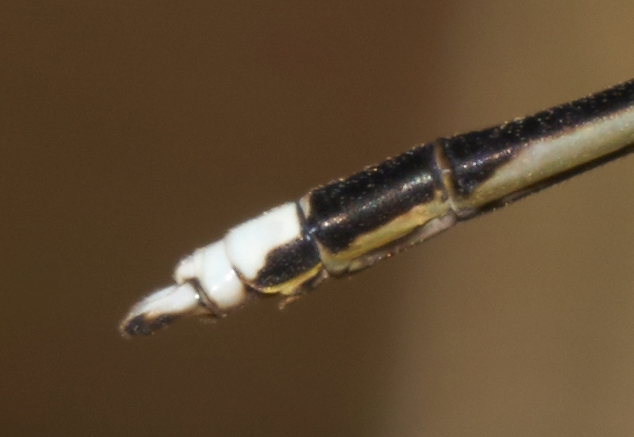
Appendages (male)

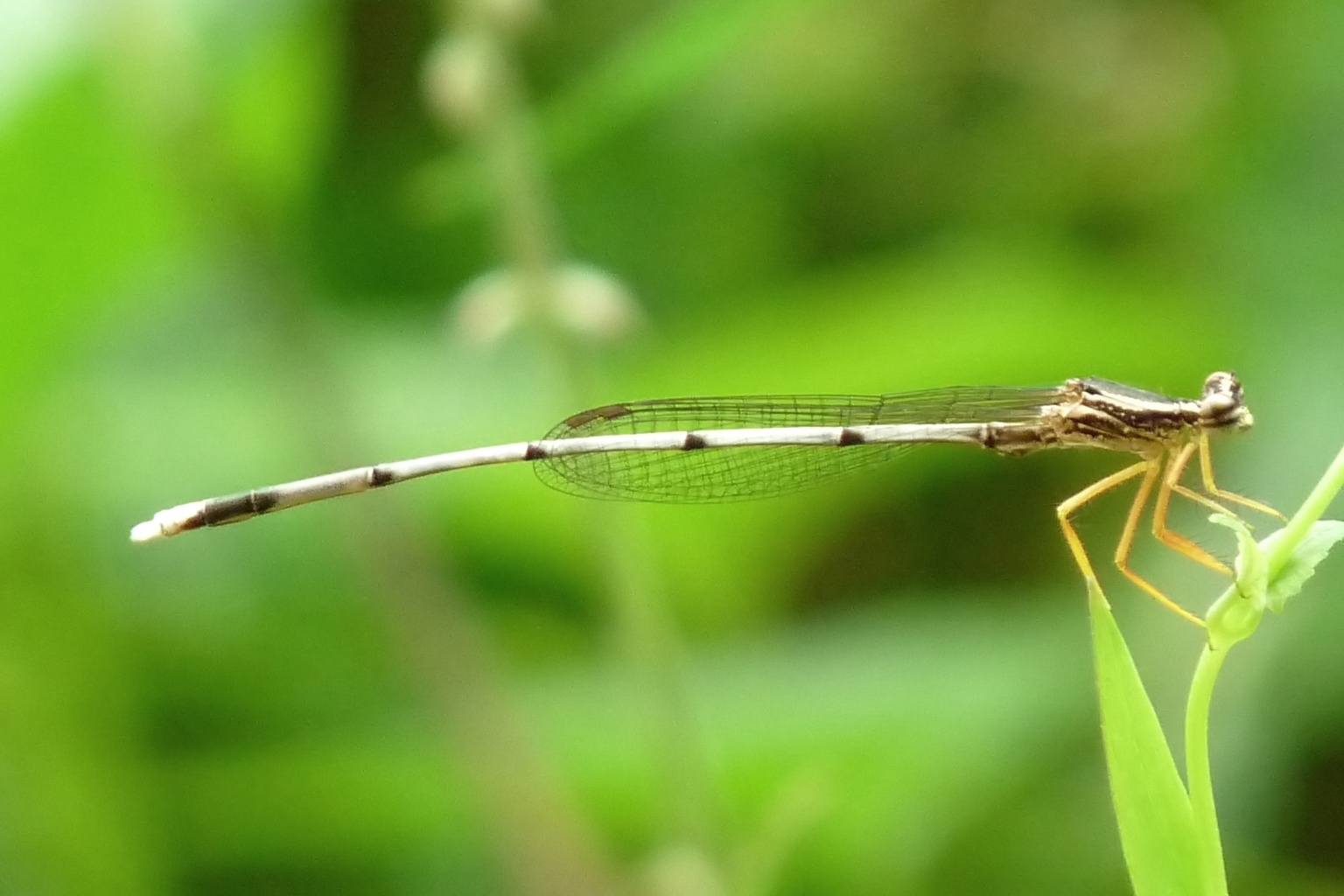
Copera marginipes juvenile male

===== Species: Copera vittata =====
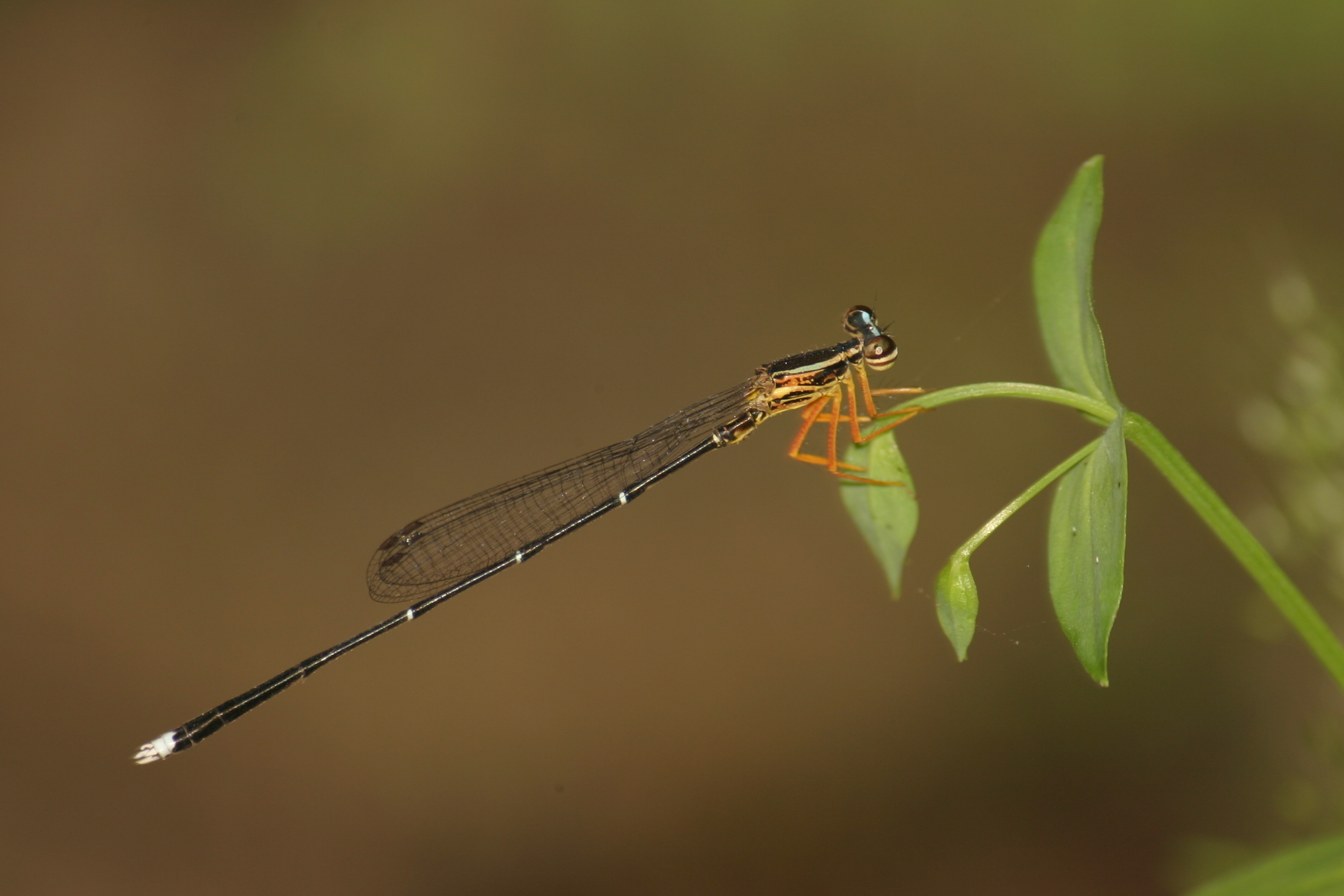
Copera vittata male

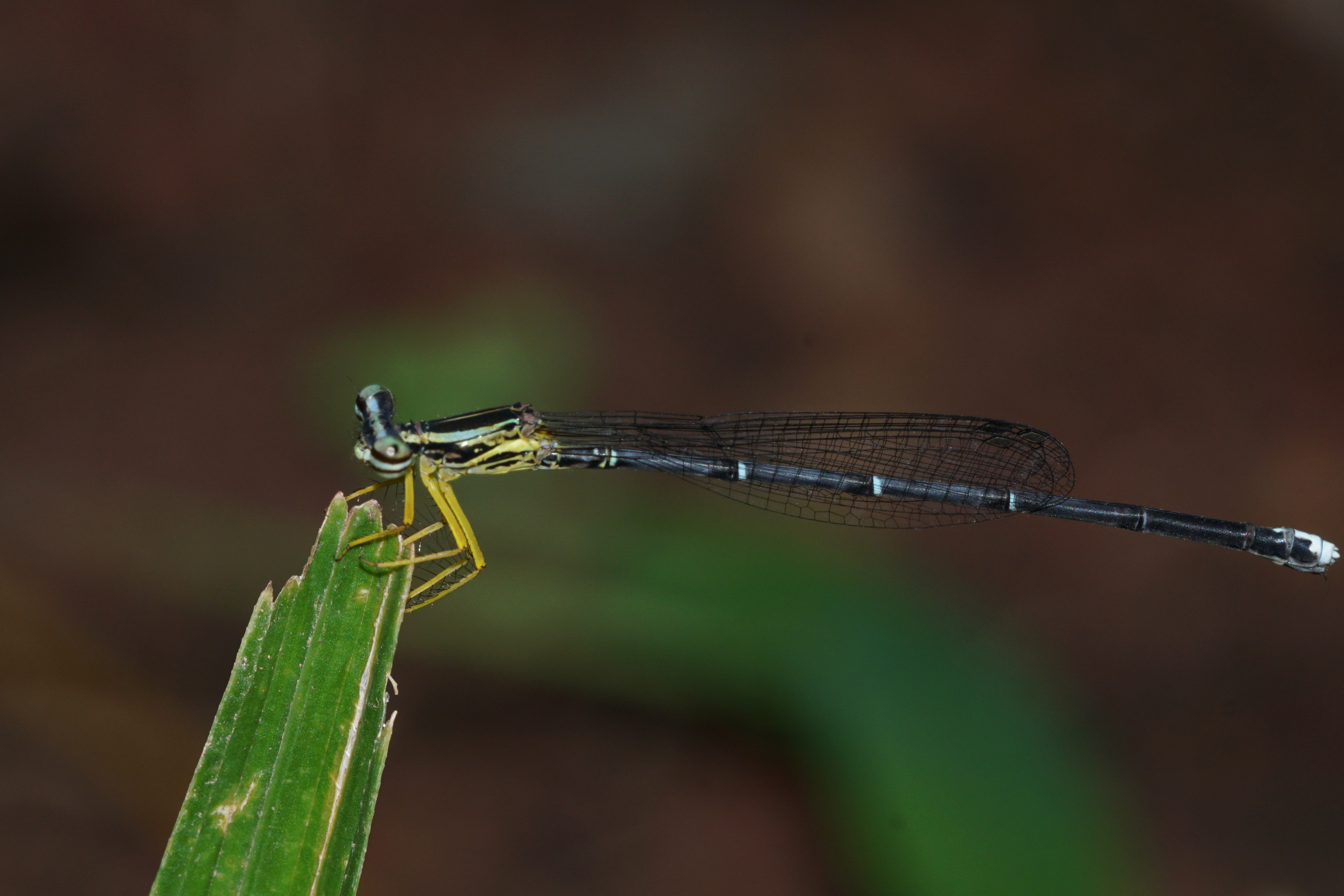
Copera vittata female

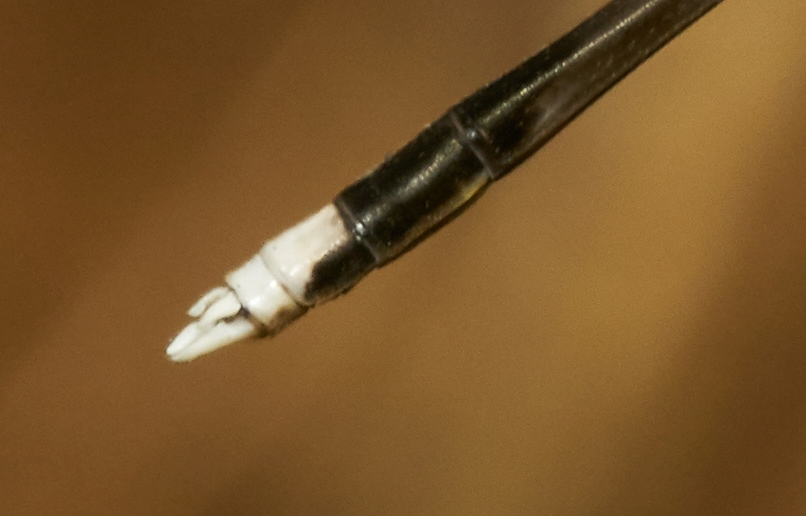
Appendages (male)

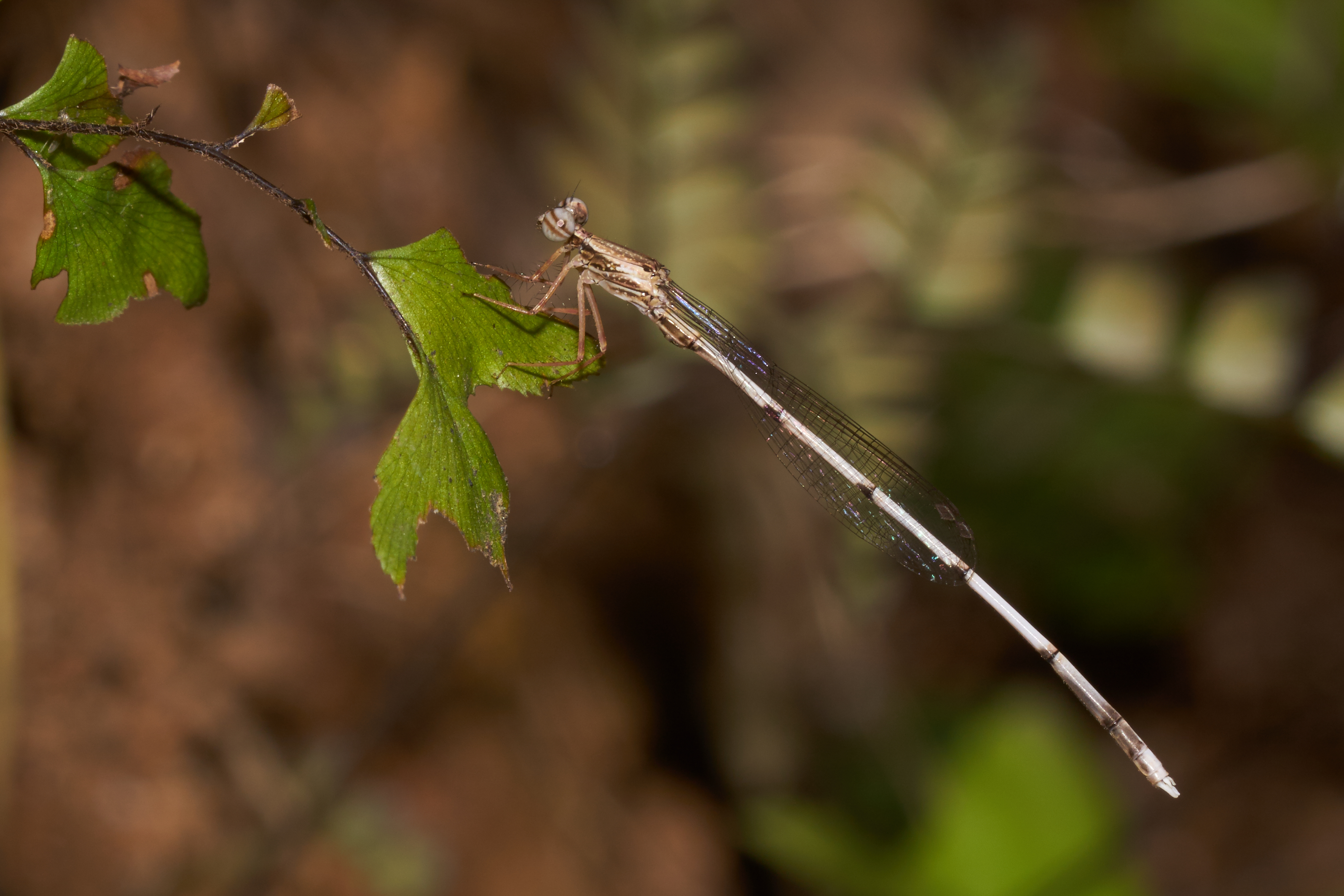
Copera vittata juvenile male

==== Genus: Disparoneura ====
===== Species: Disparoneura apicalis =====
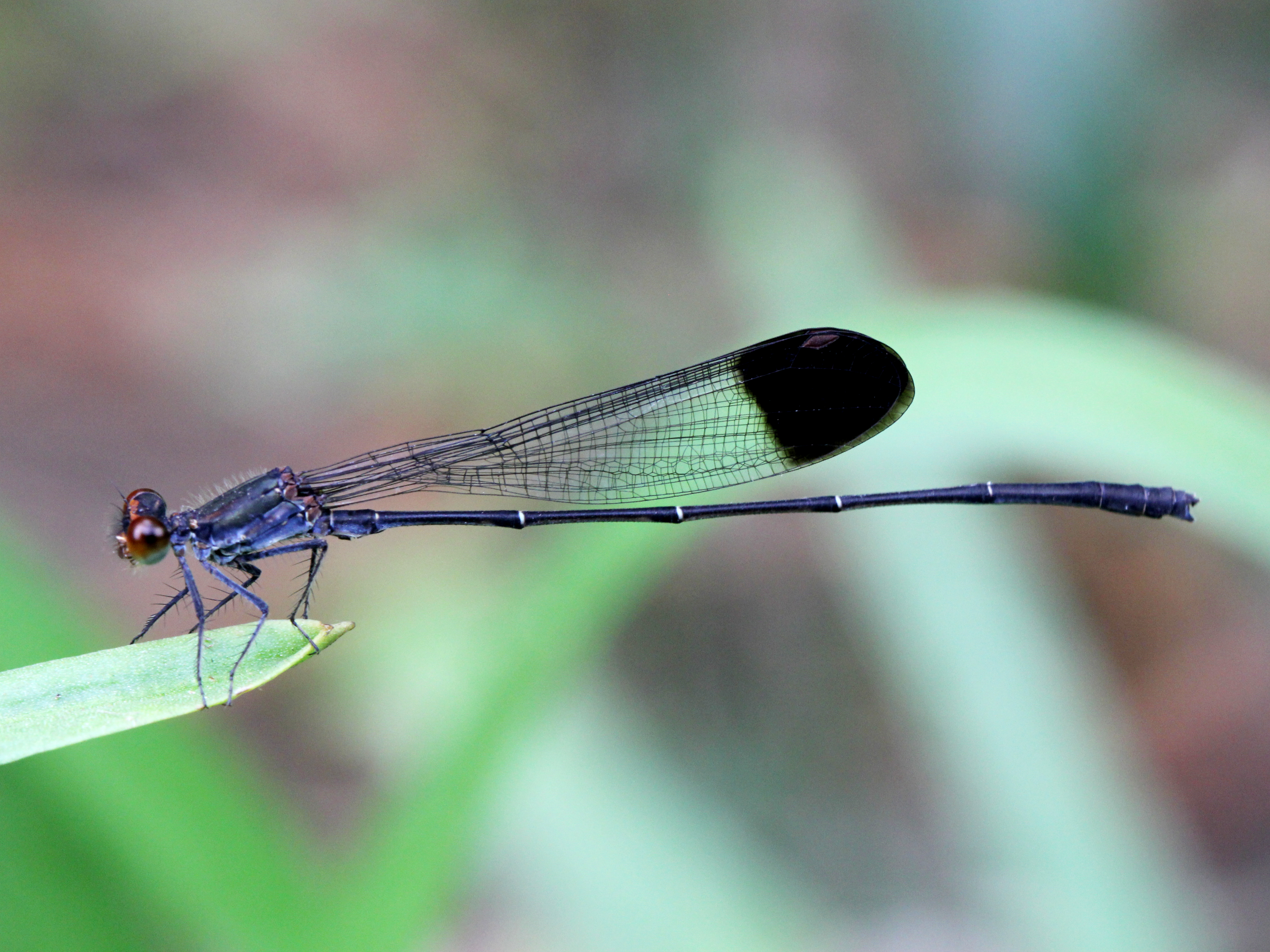
male

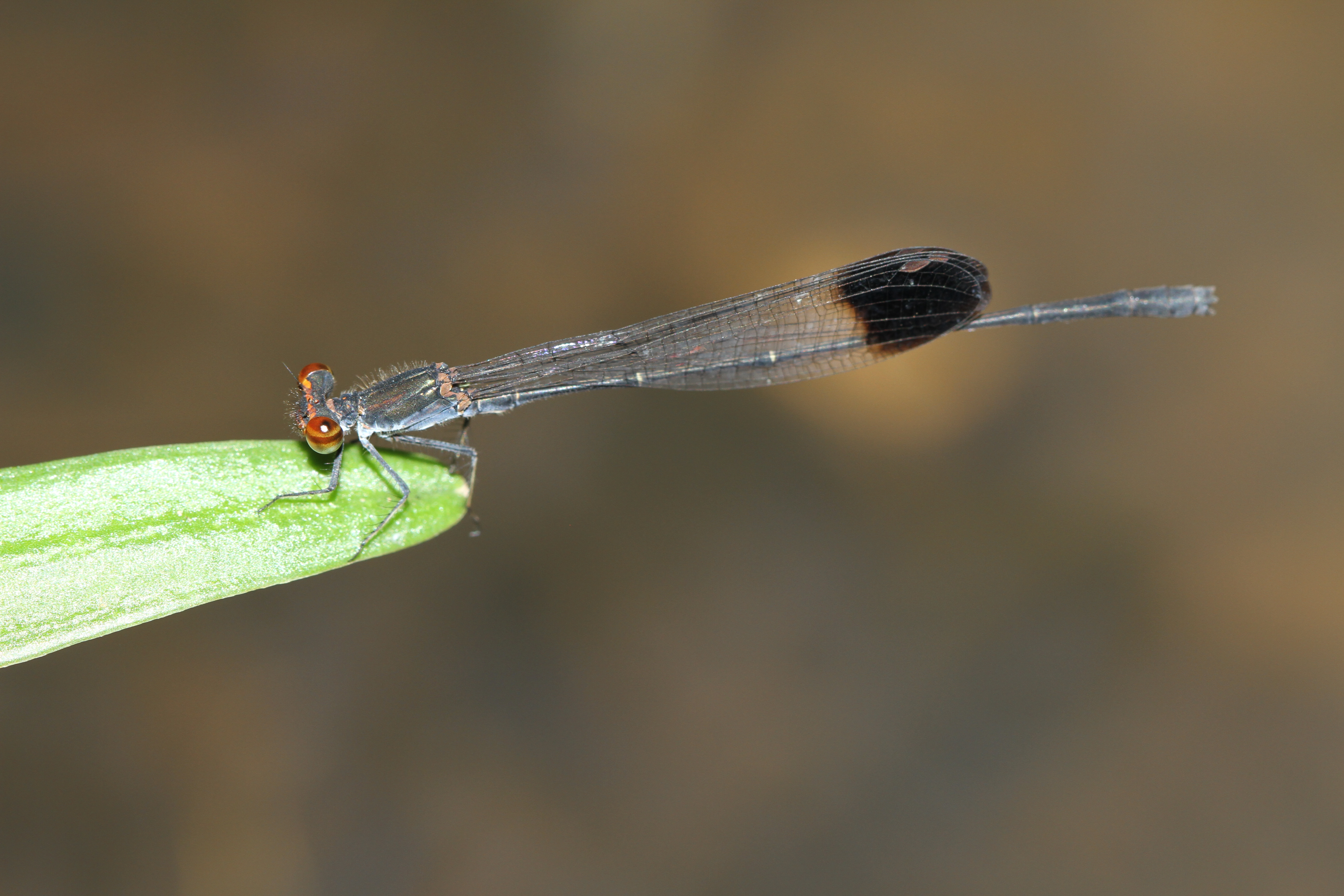
Disparoneura apicalis male

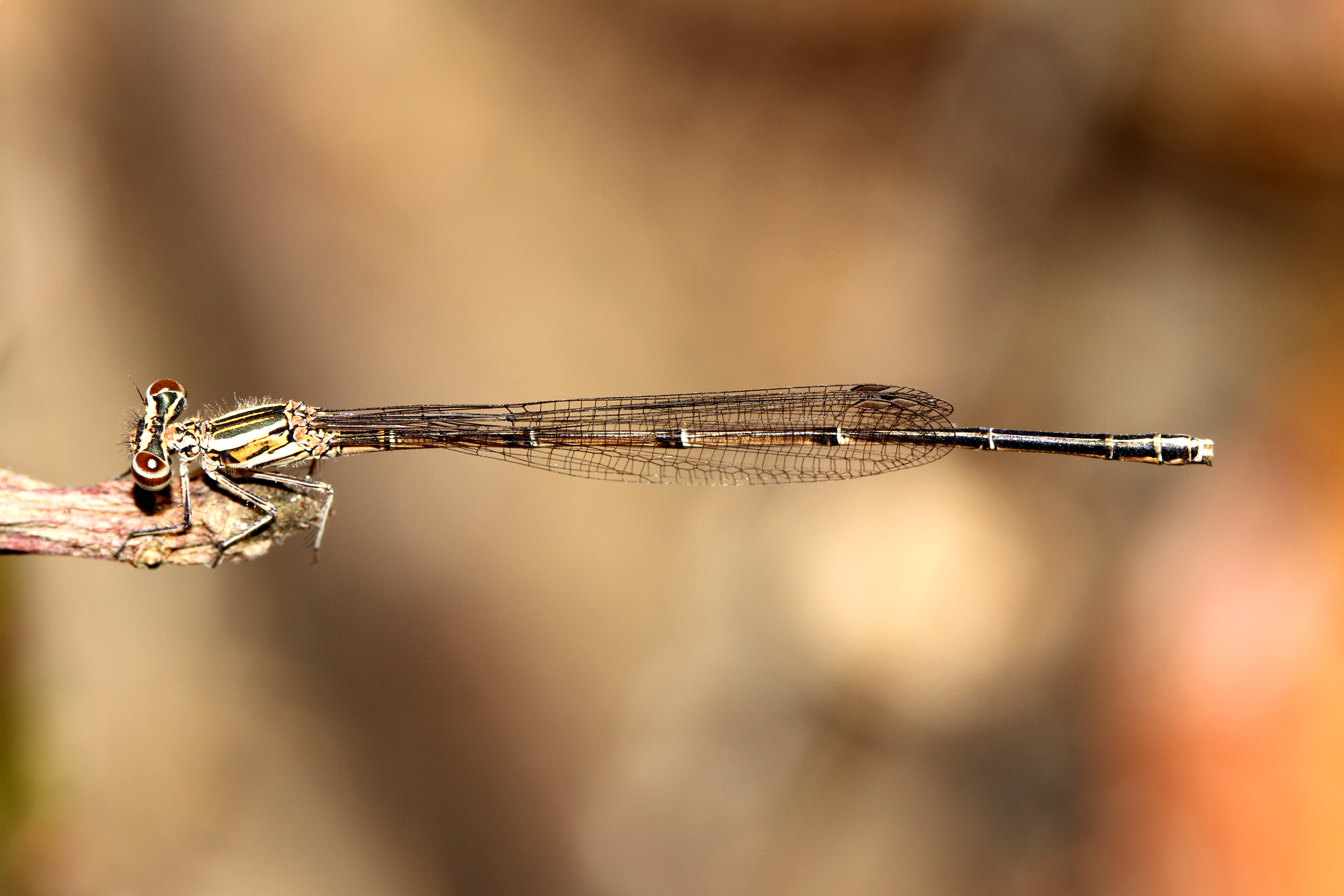
Disparoneura apicalis female

===== Species: Disparoneura quadrimaculata =====
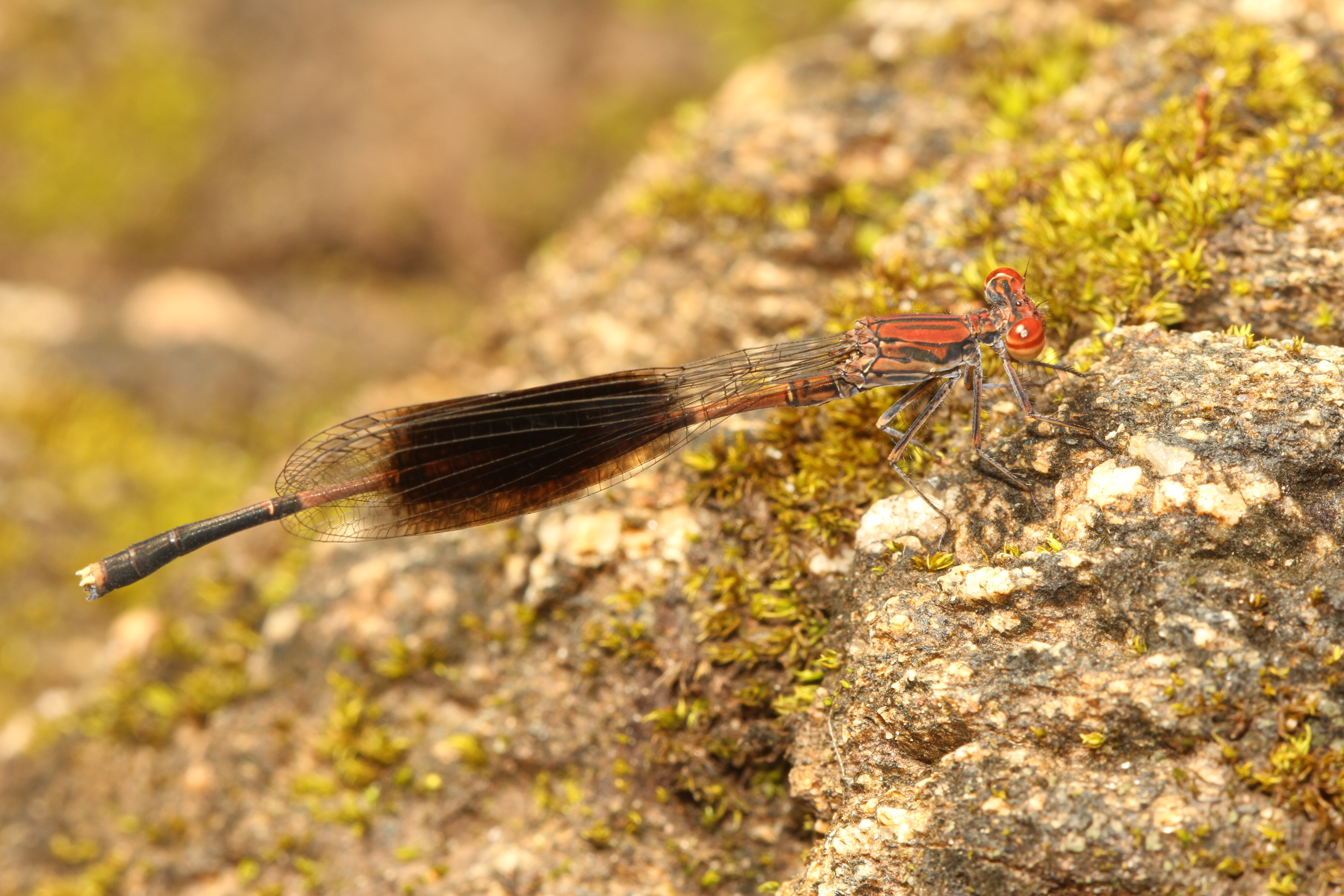
Disparoneura quadrimaculata male

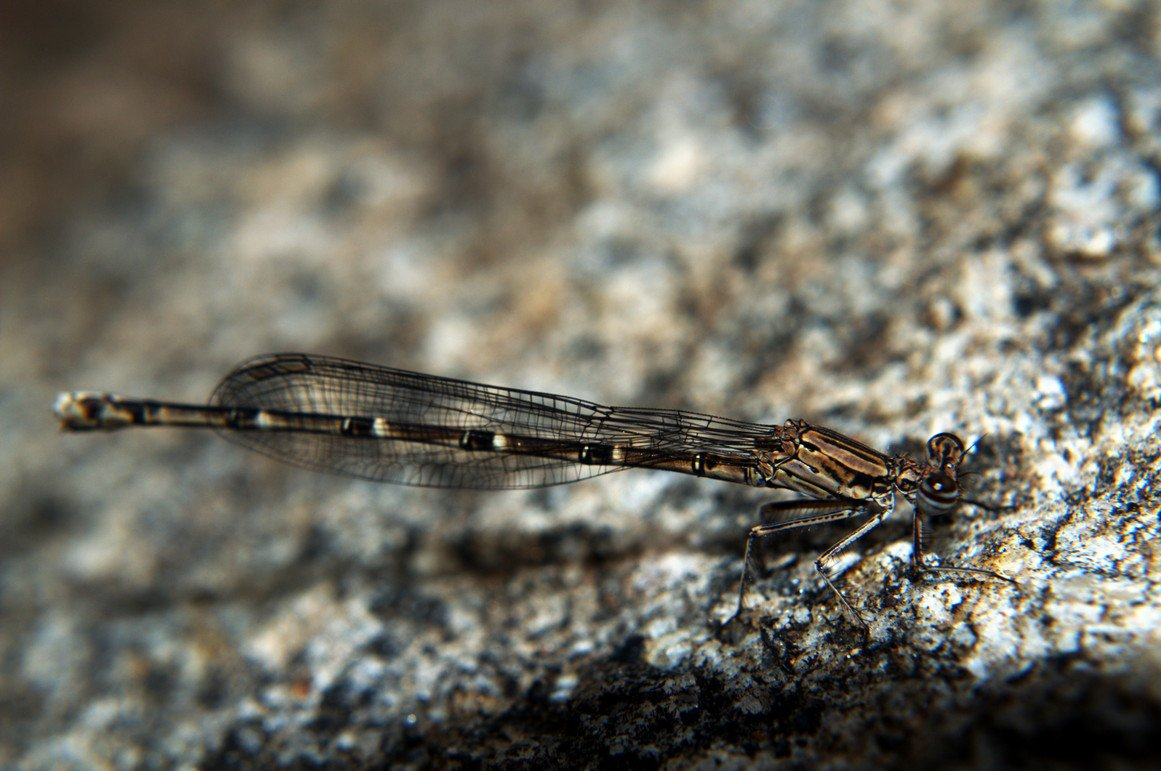
Disparoneura quadrimaculata female

==== Genus: Elattoneura ====
===== Species: Elattoneura souteri =====
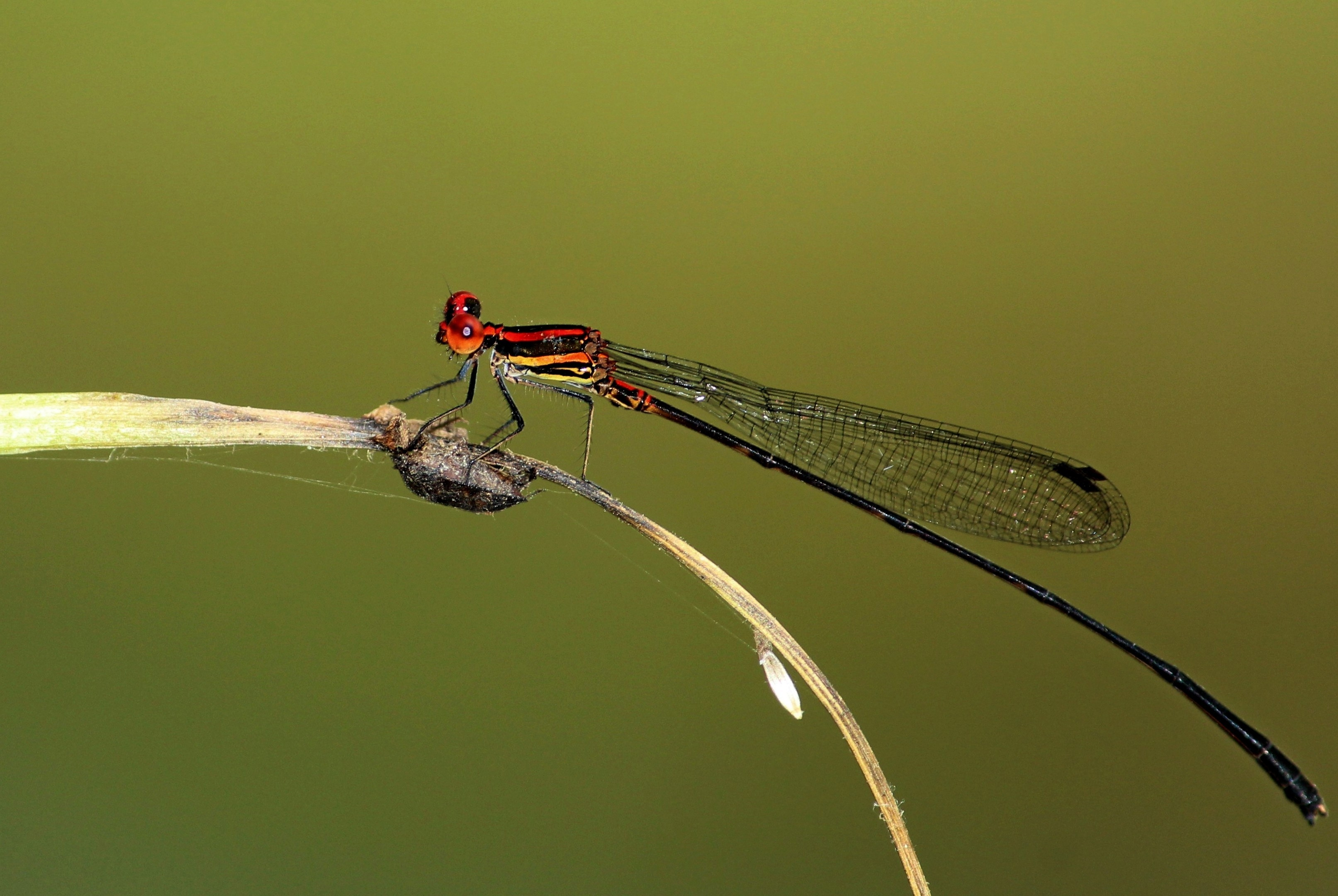
male

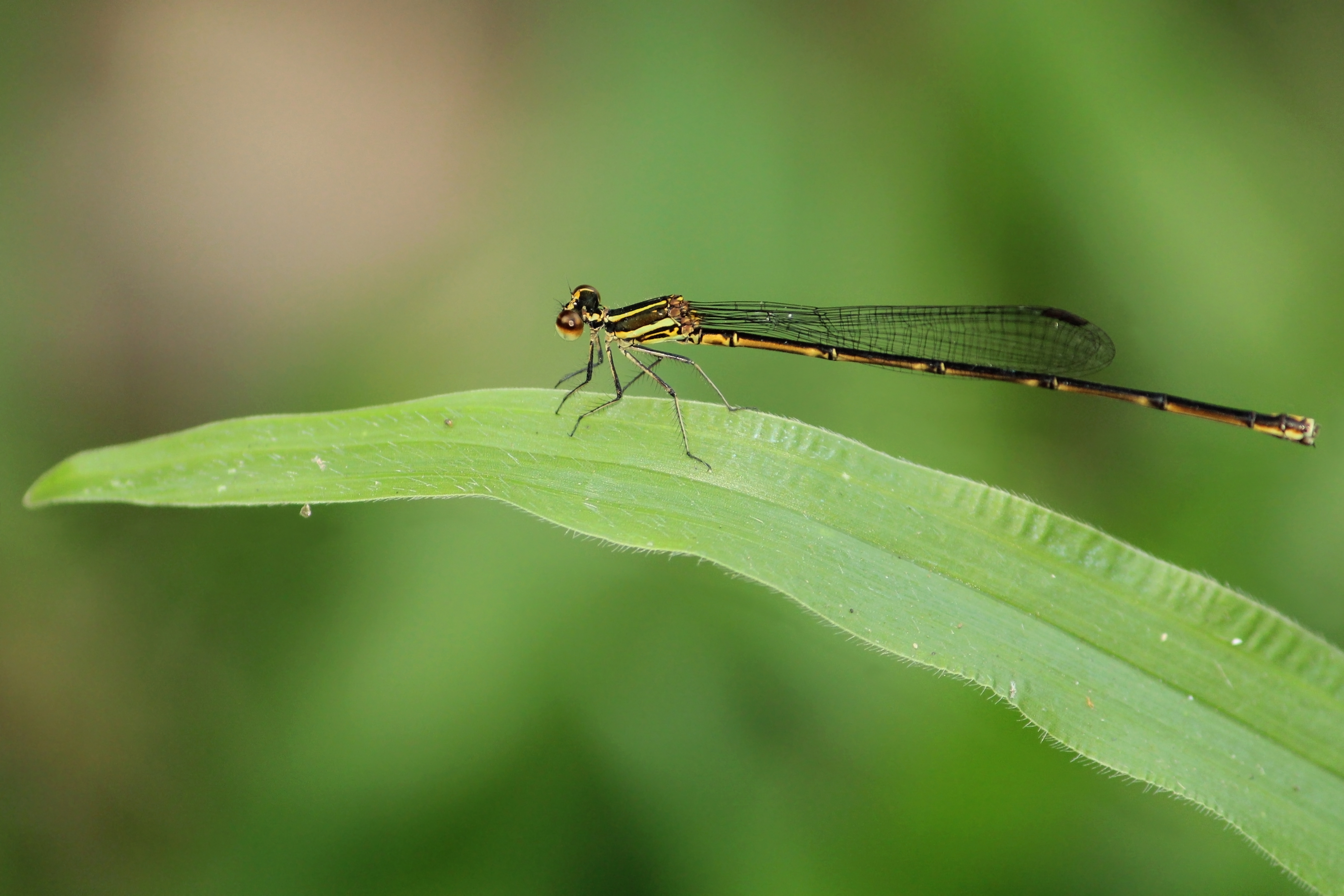
female

===== Species: Elattoneura tetrica =====
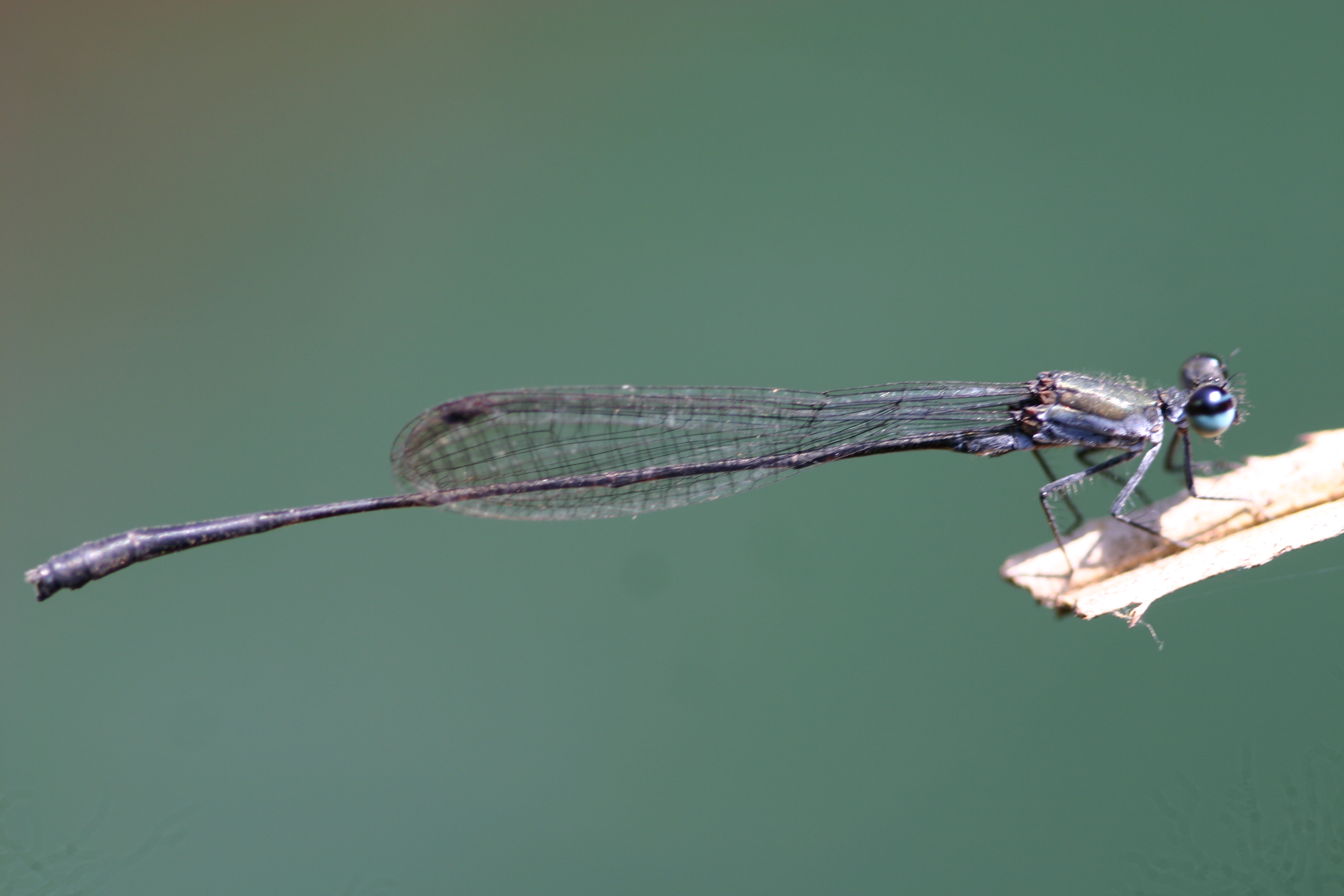
male

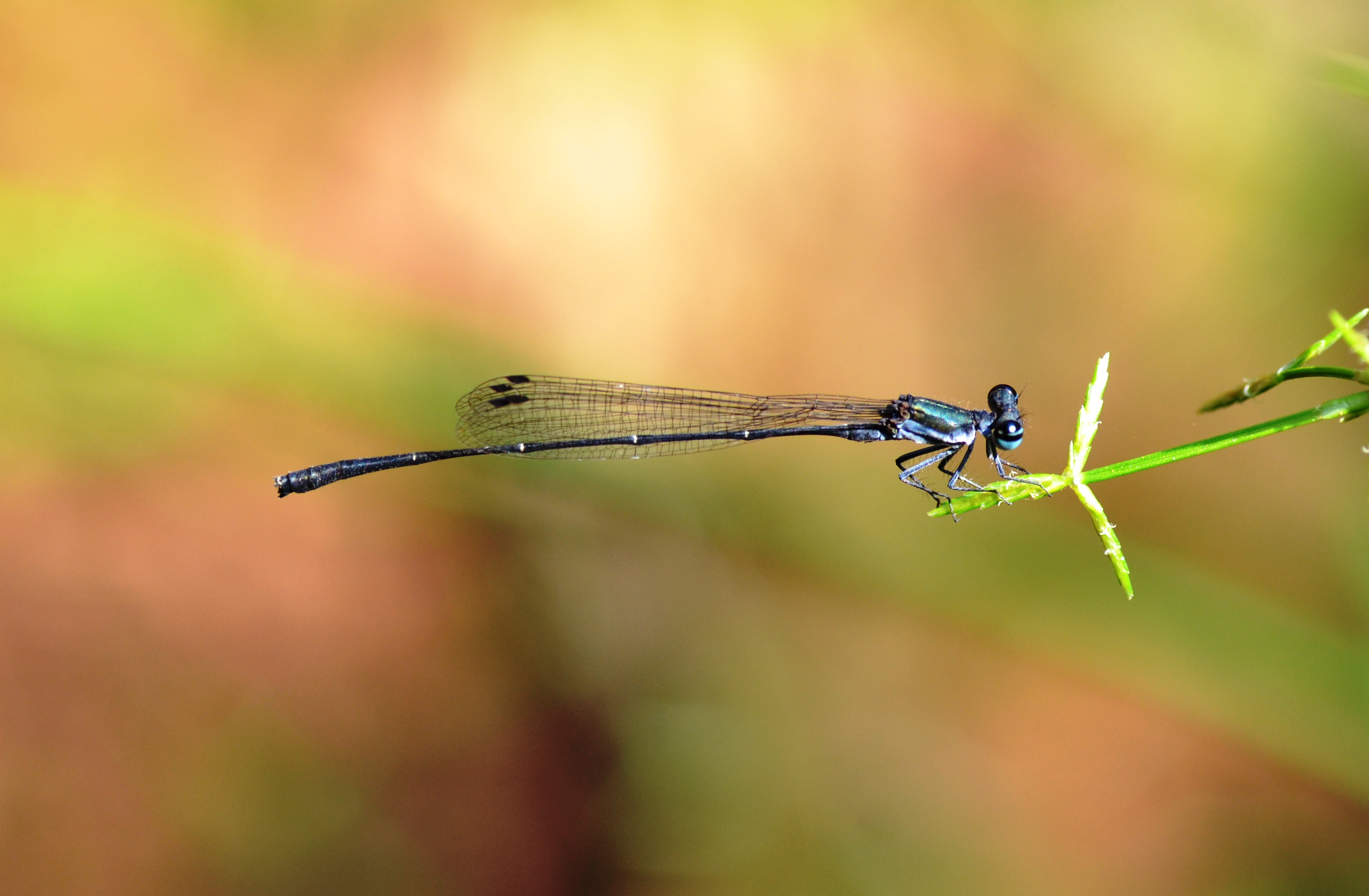
male

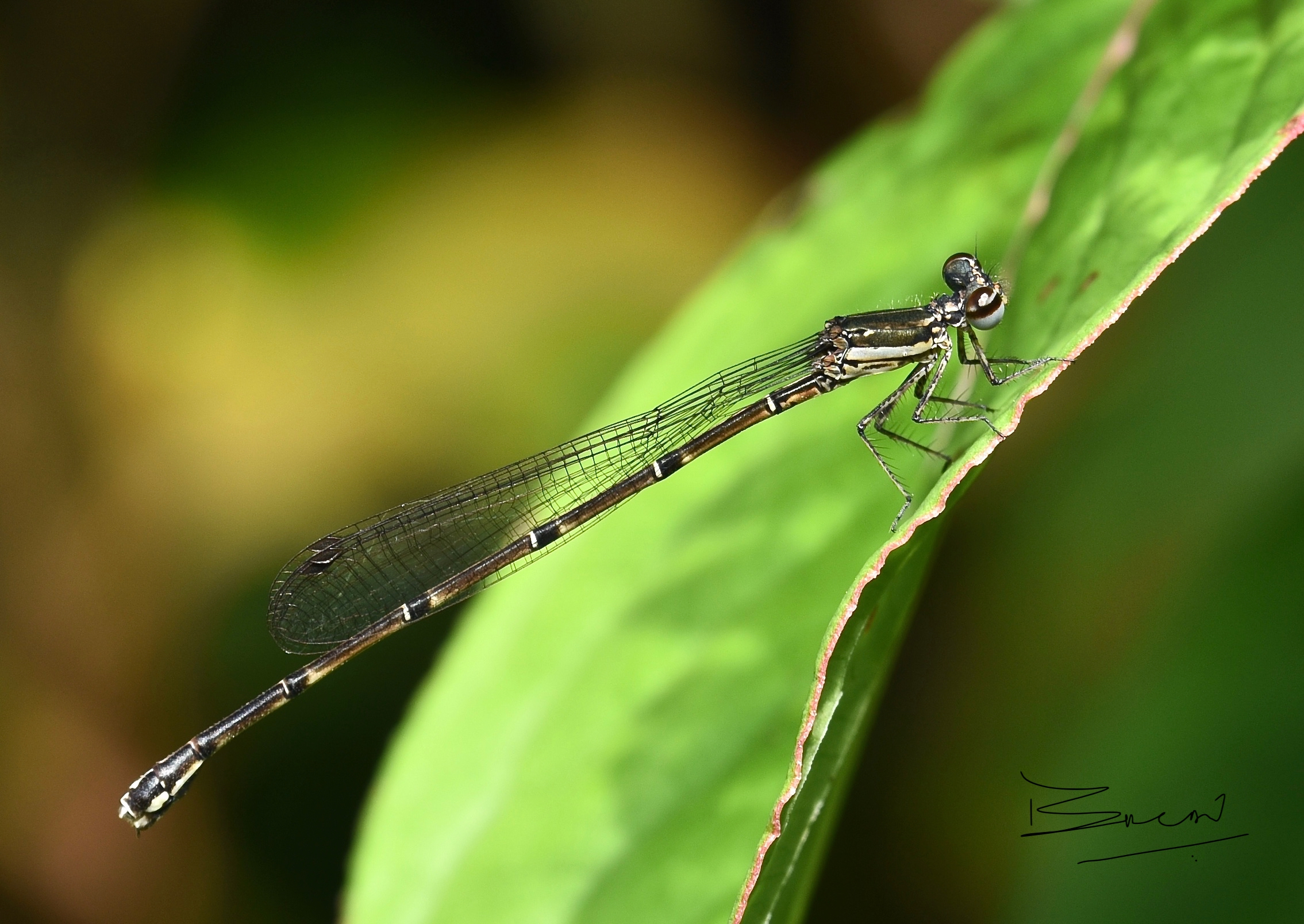
female

==== Genus: Esme ====
===== Species: Esme cyaneovittata =====
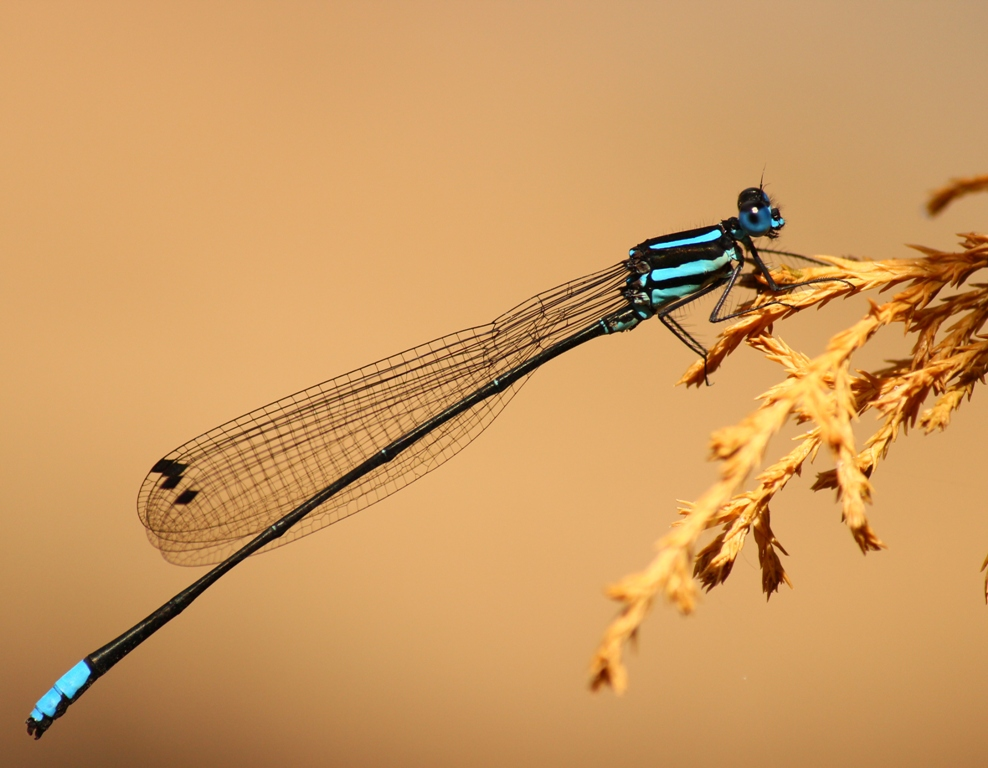
Male

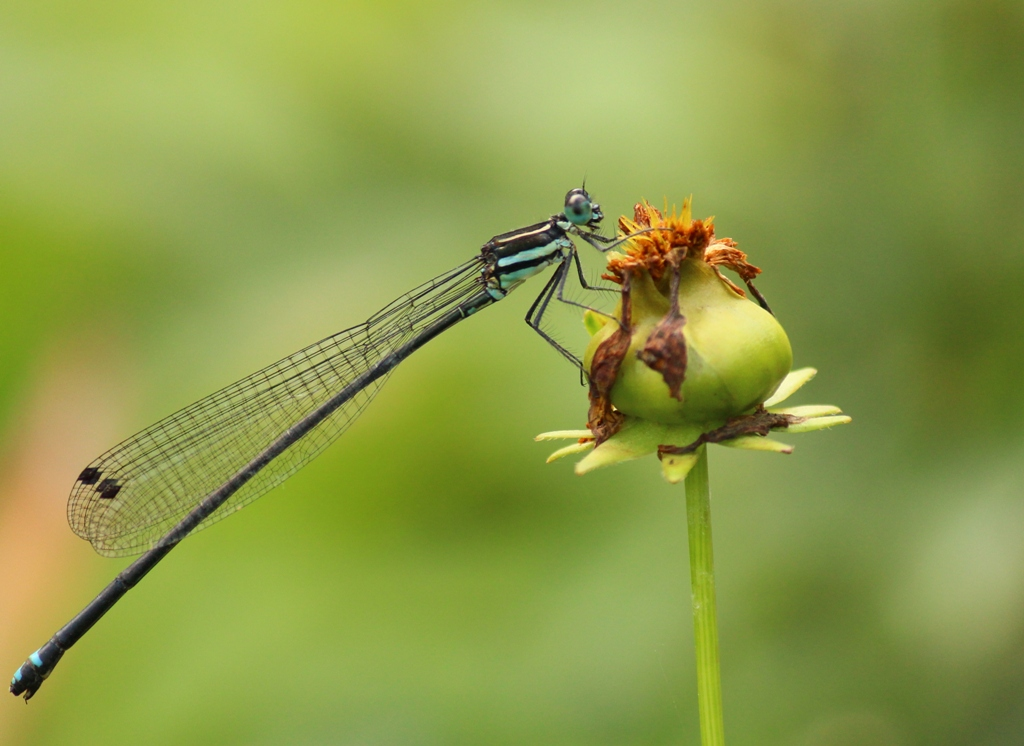
Female

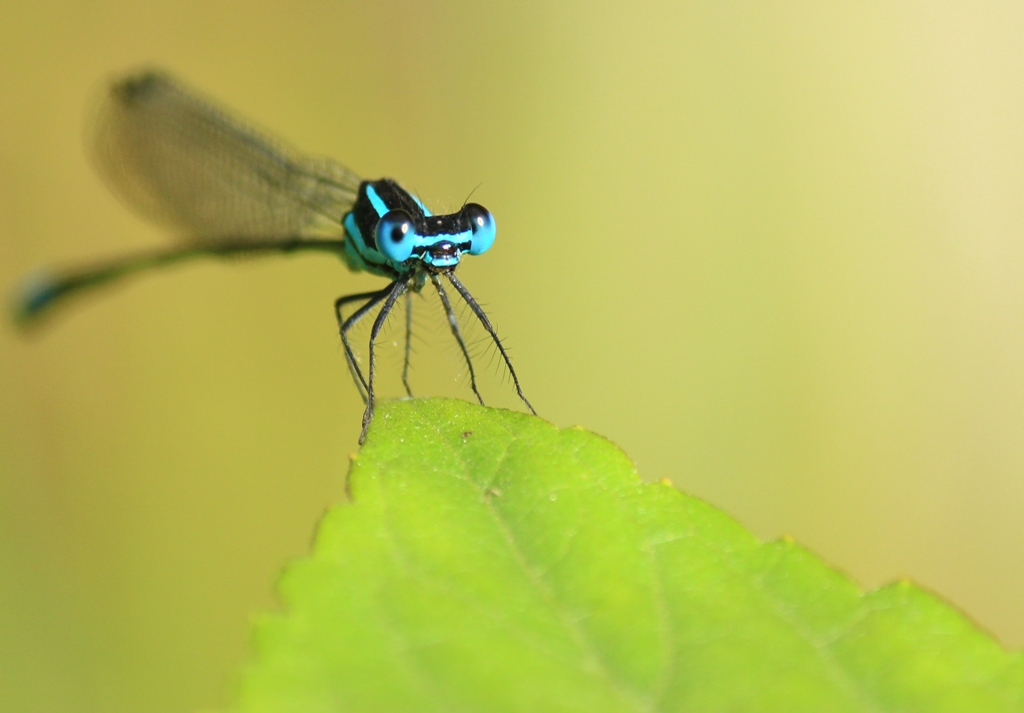
Face

===== Species: Esme longistyla =====
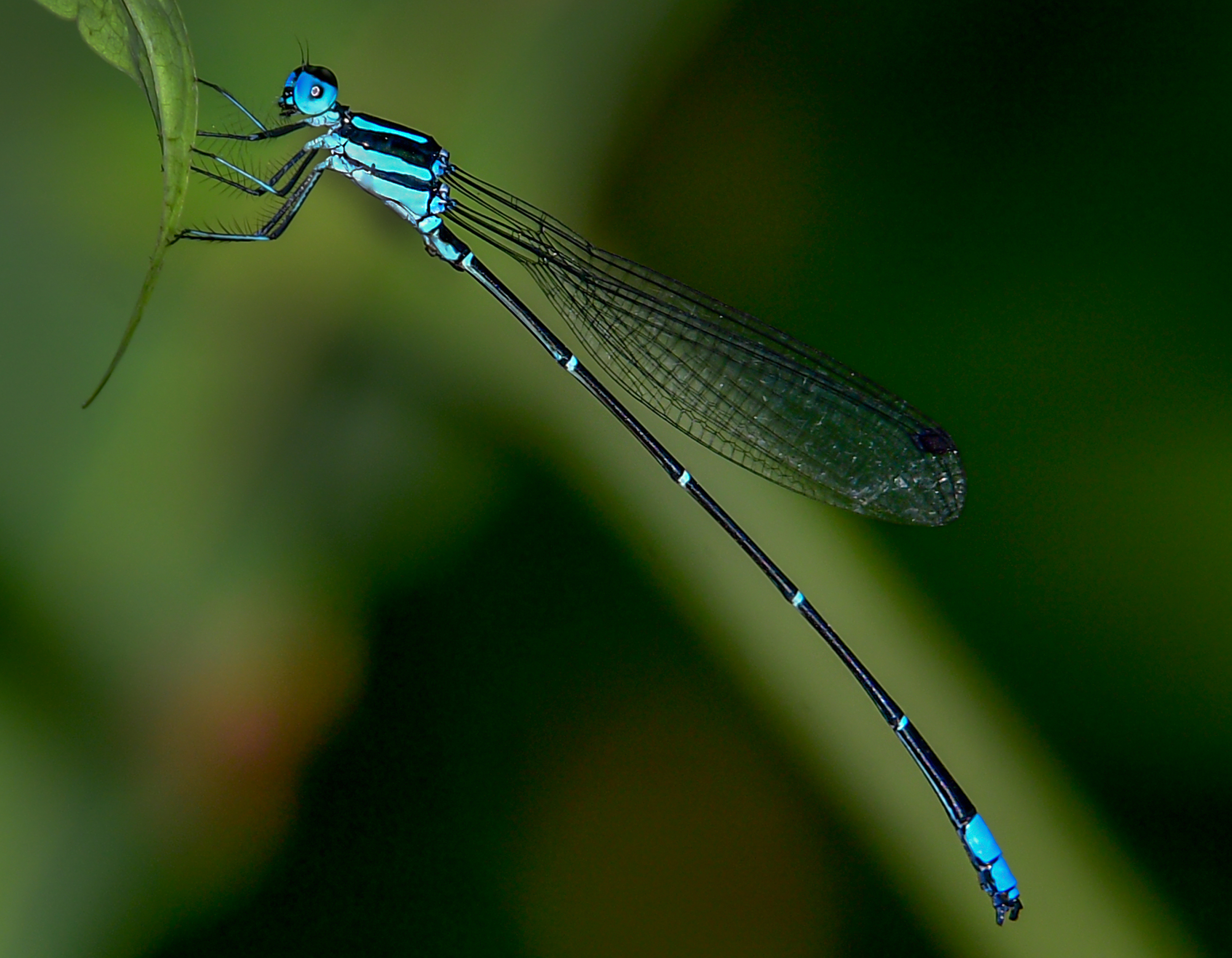
Male

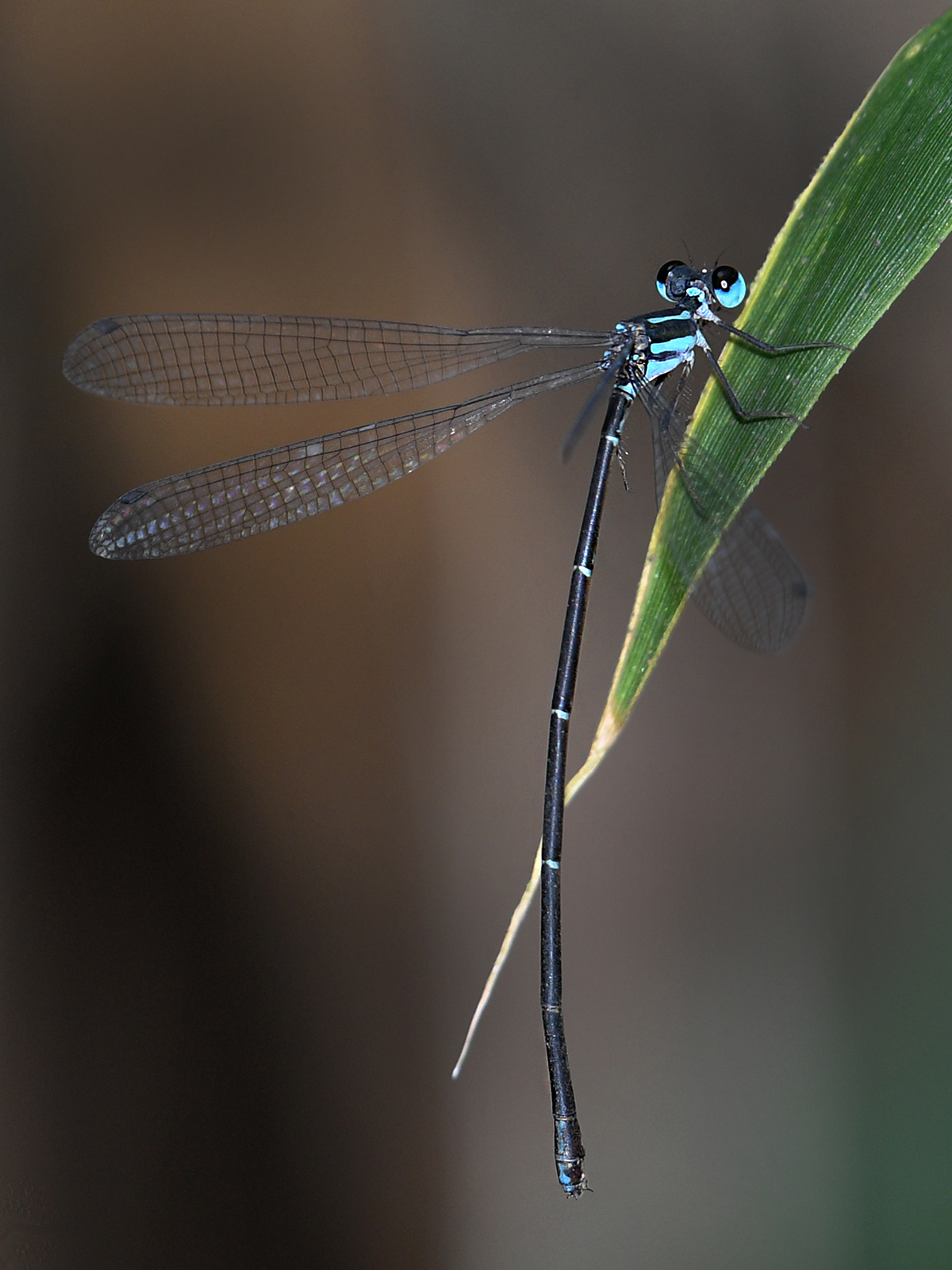
Female

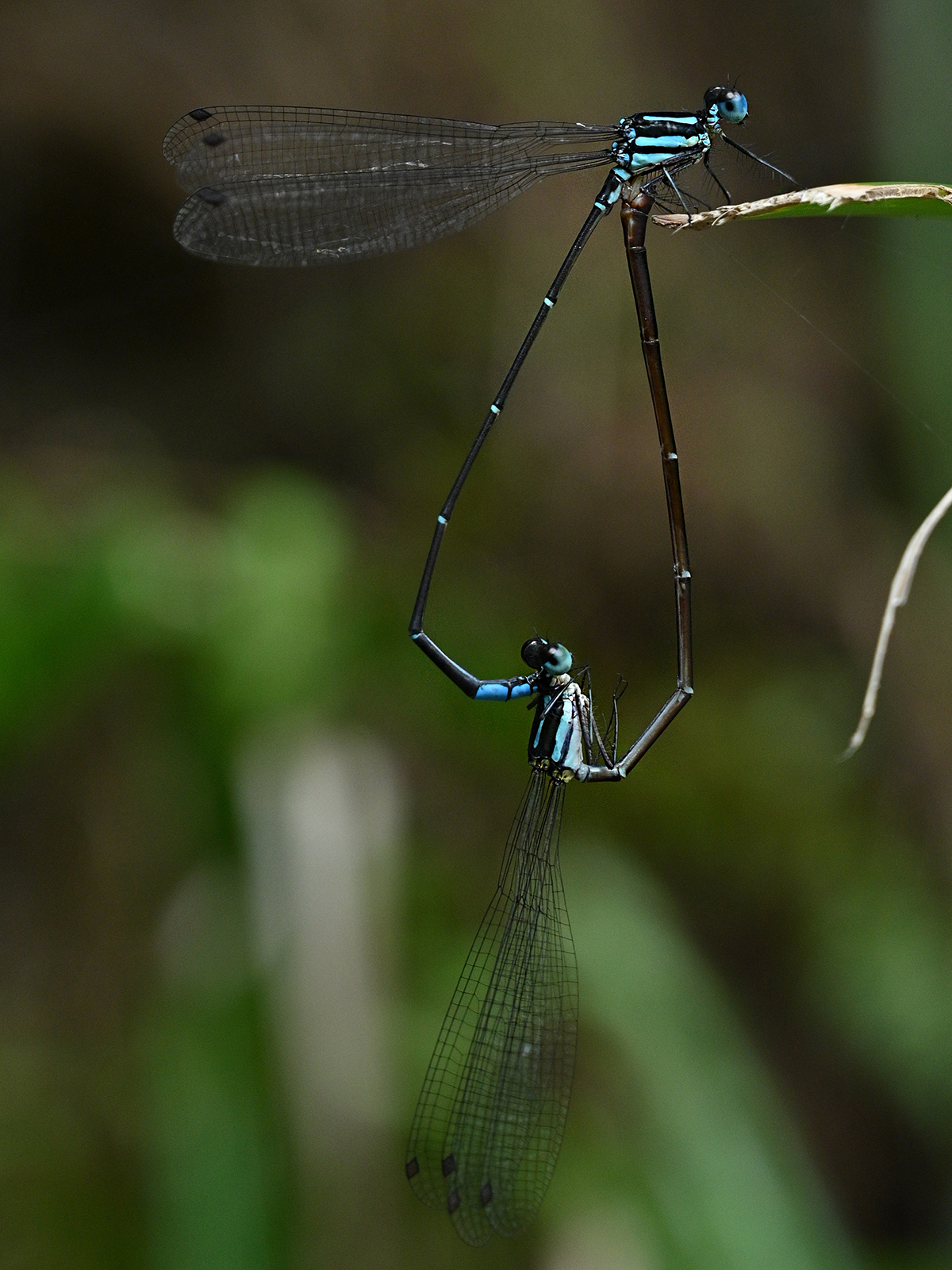
Mating pair

===== Species: Esme mudiensis =====
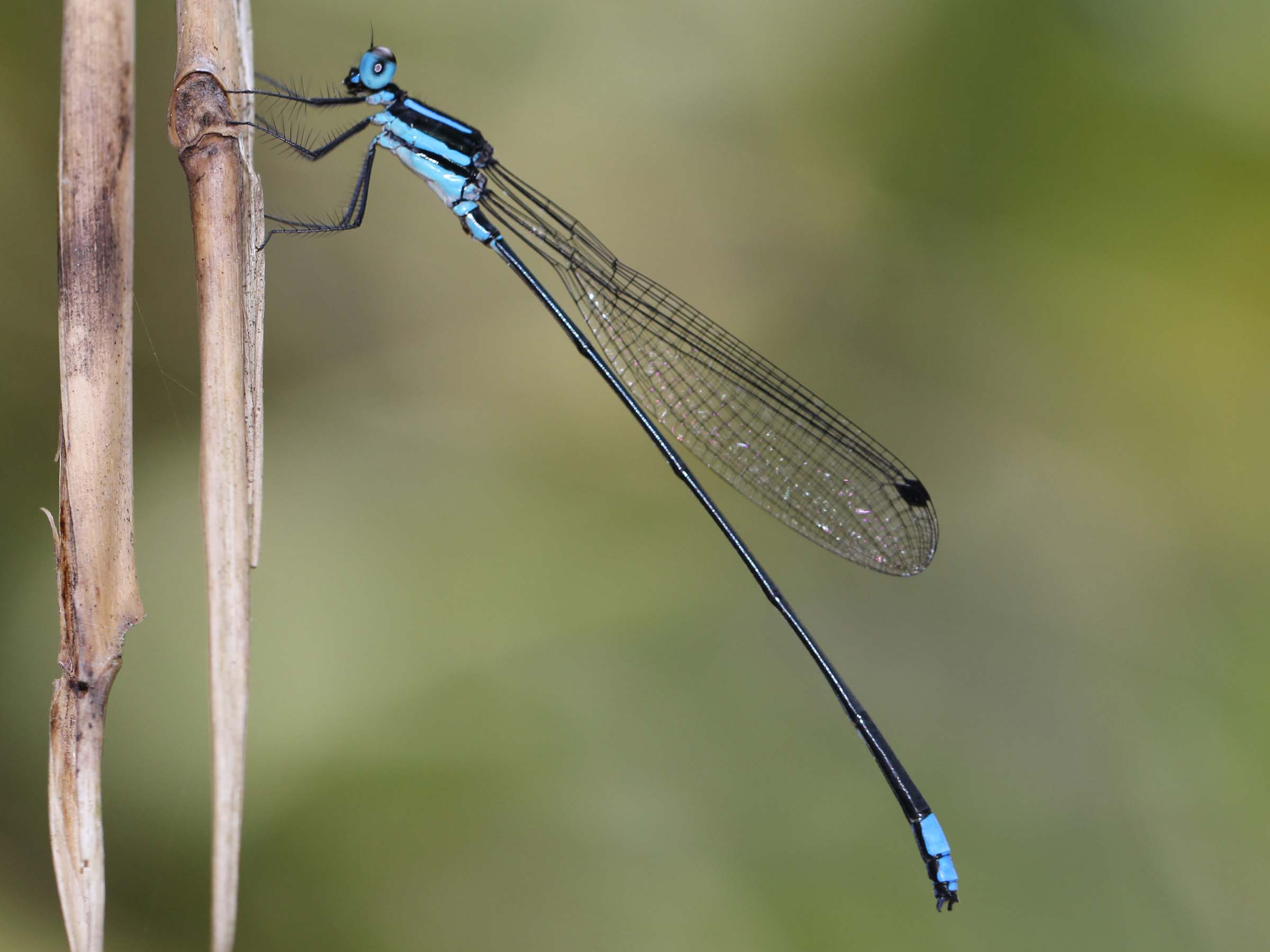
Esme mudiensis male

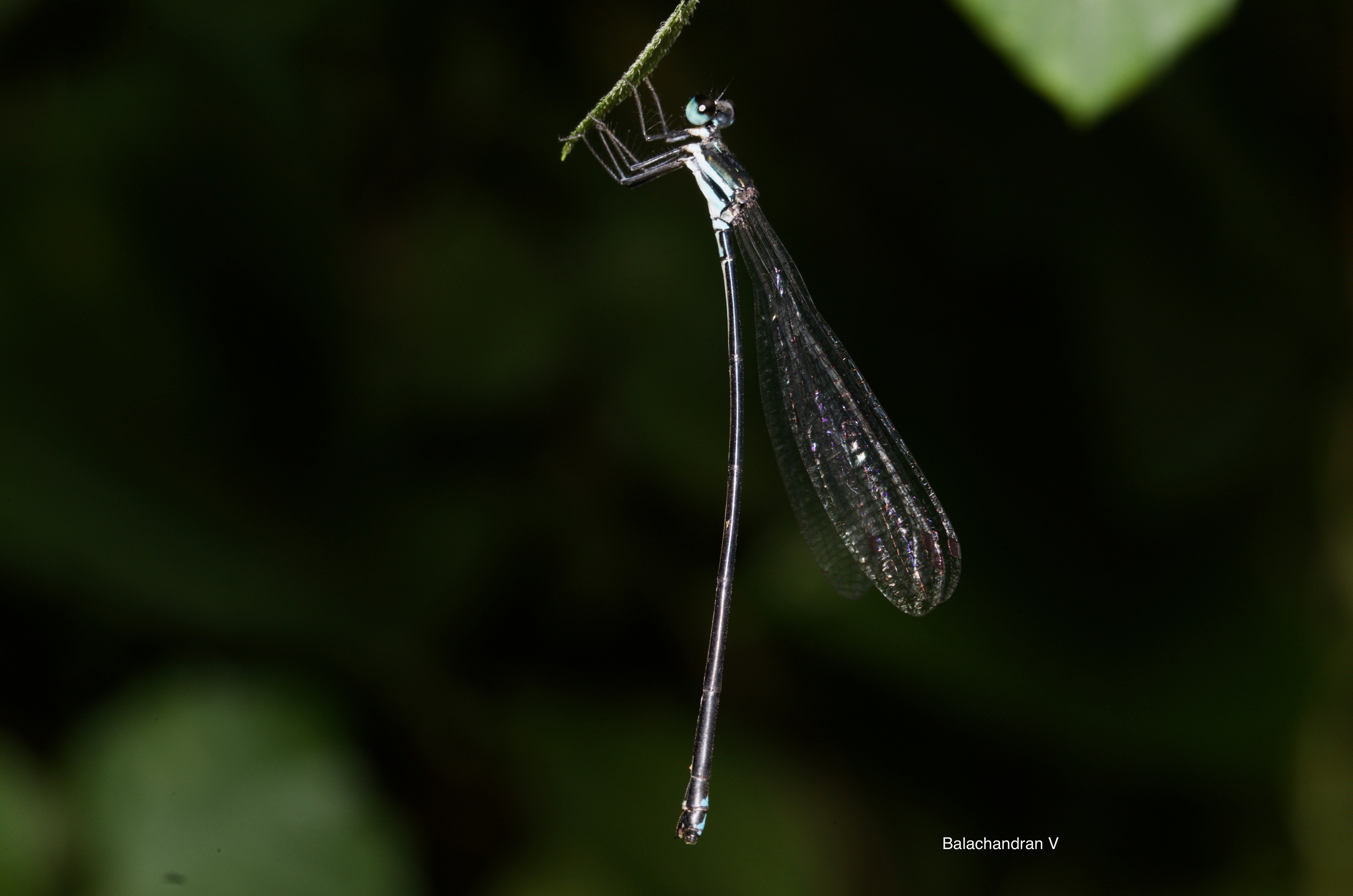
Esme mudiensis female

==== Genus: Melanoneura ====
===== Species: Melanoneura bilineata =====
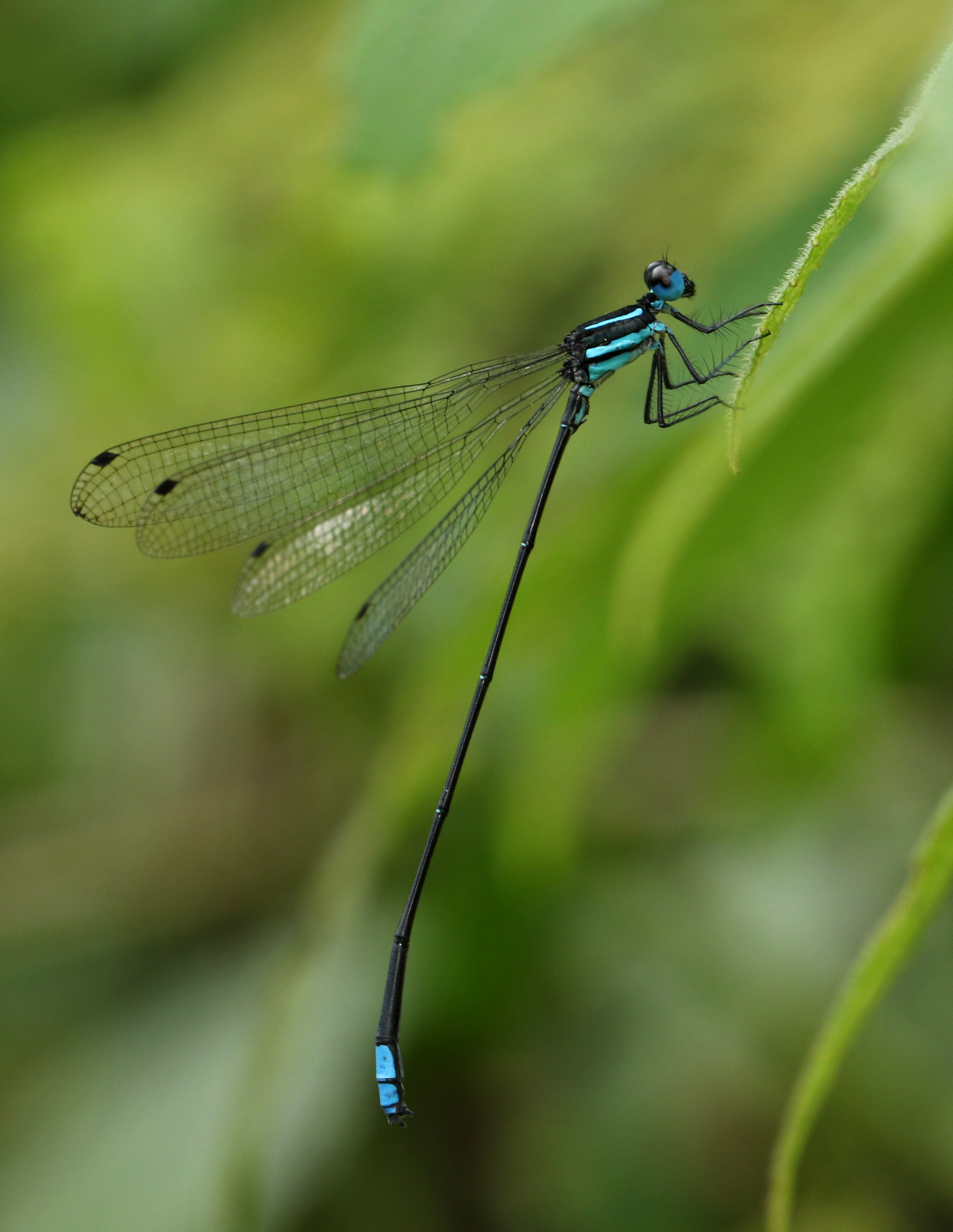
male

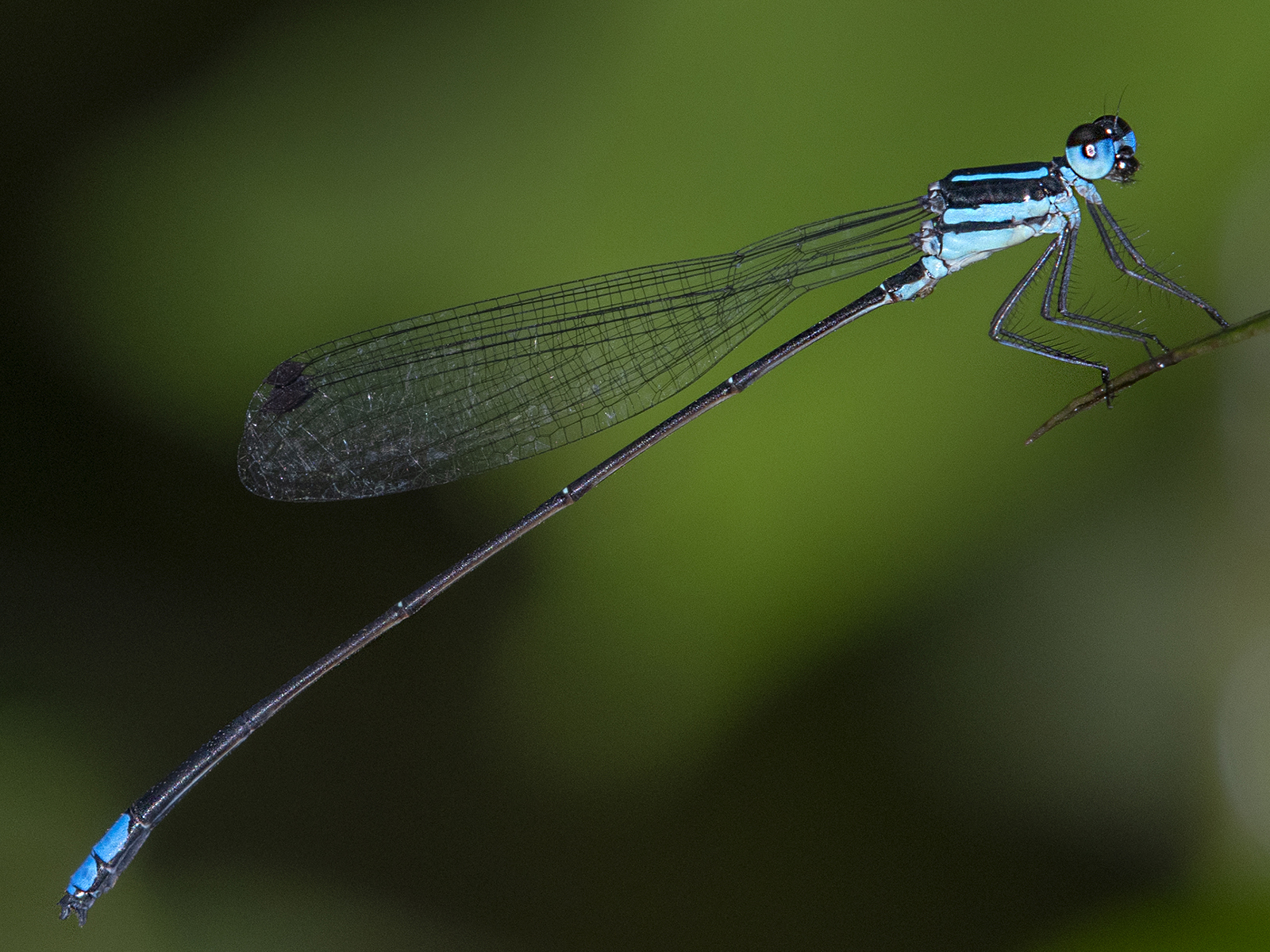
male

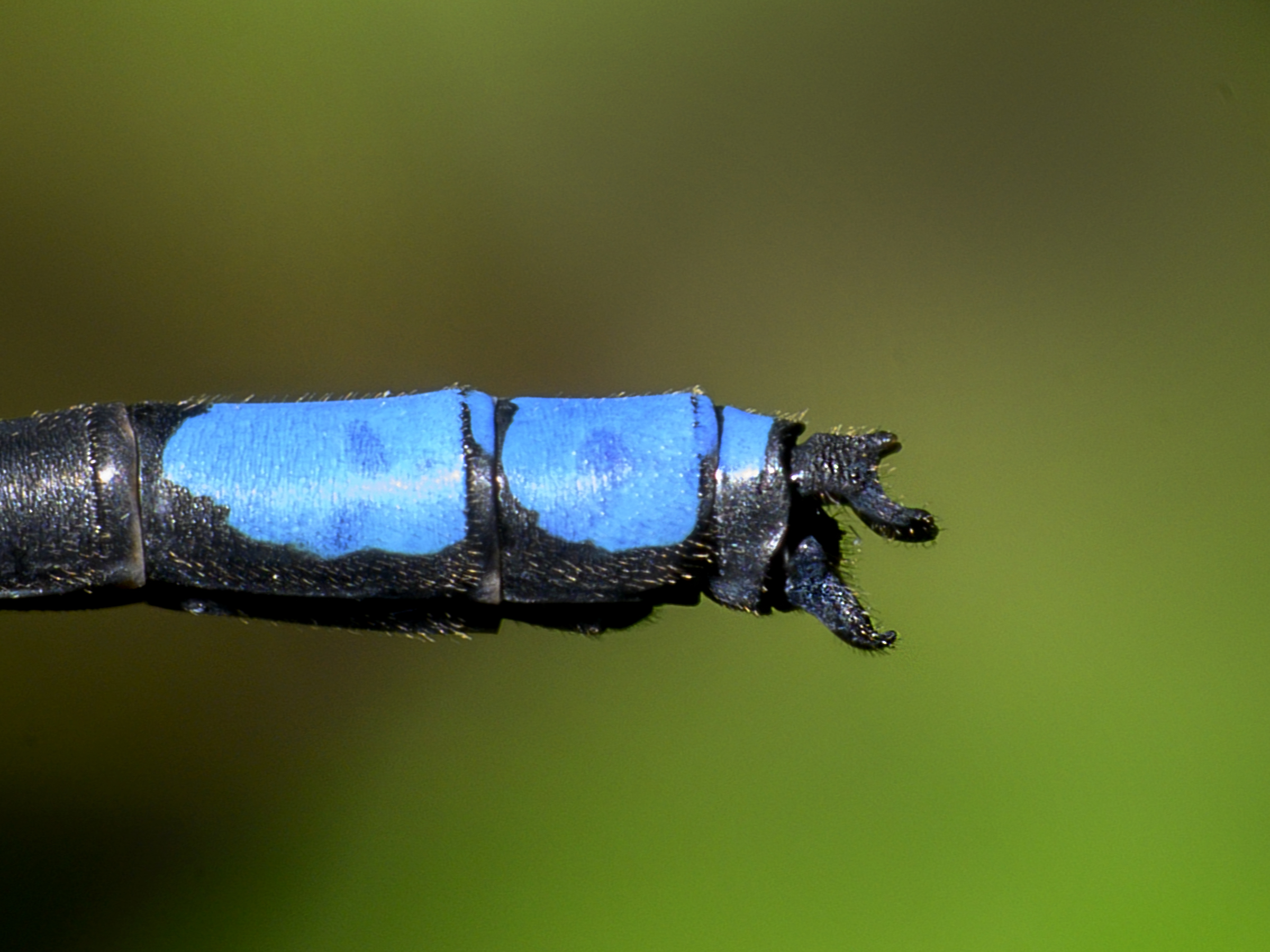
appendages

==== Genus: Onychargia ====
===== Species: Onychargia atrocyana =====
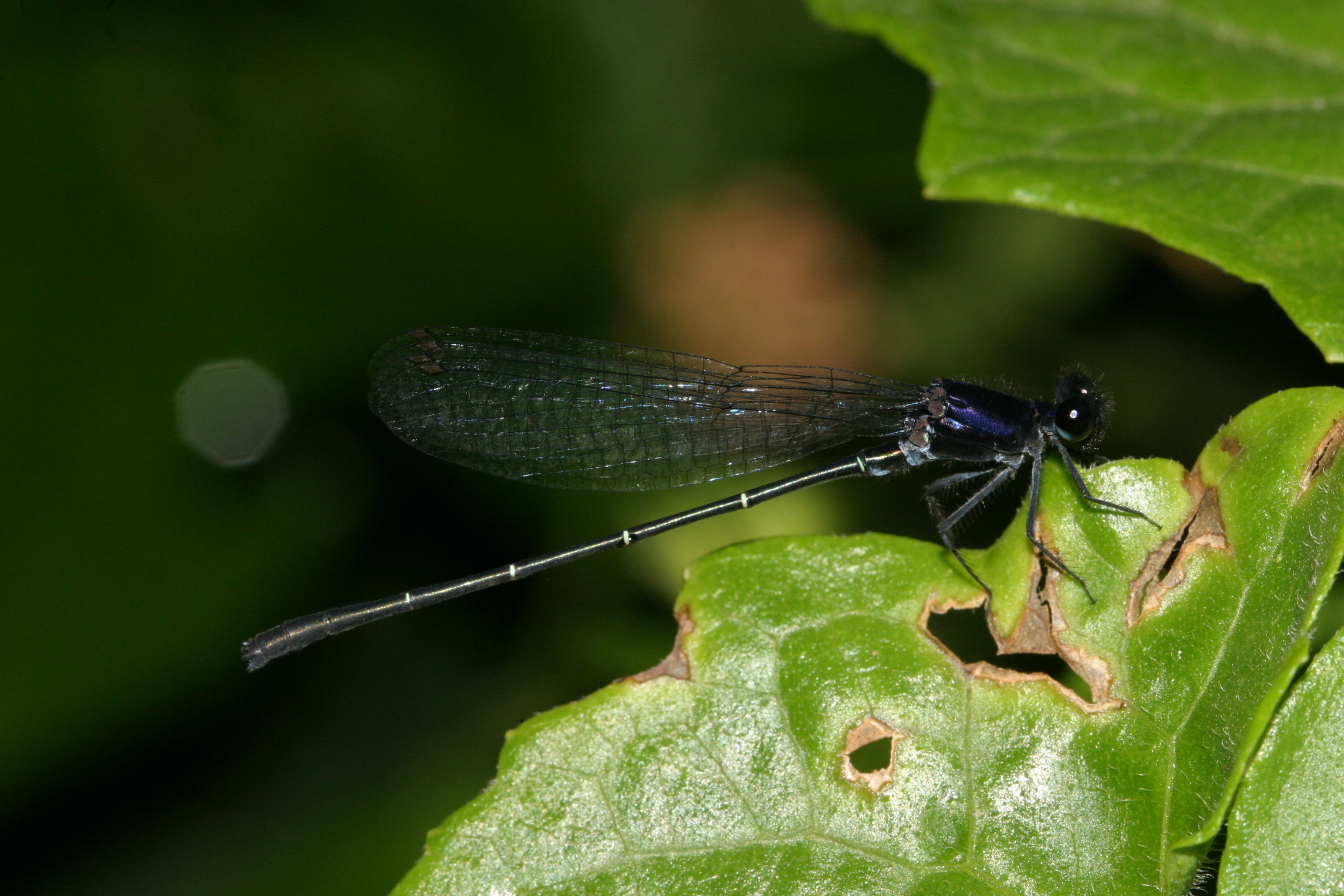
Onychargia atrocyana male

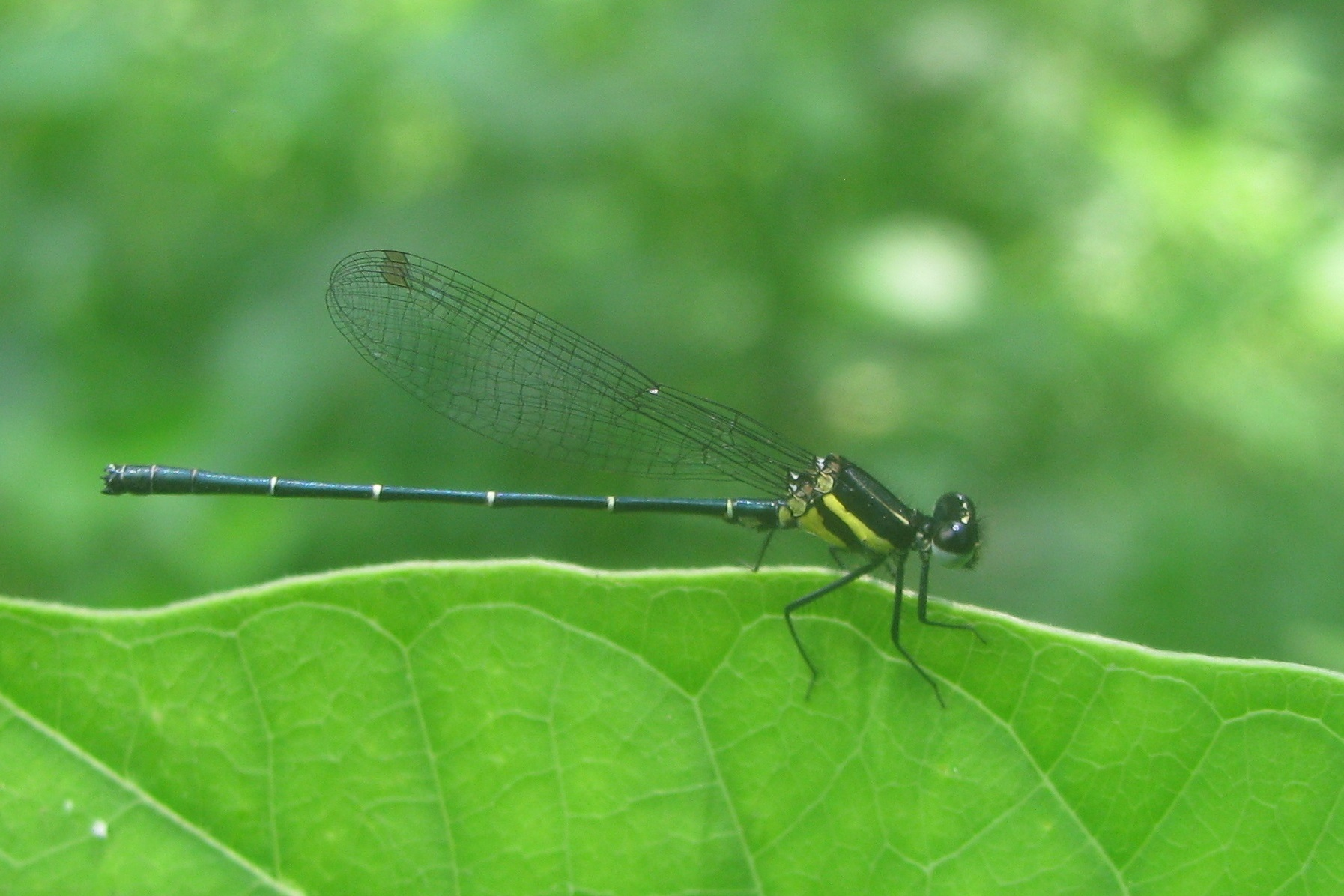
male (sub-adult)

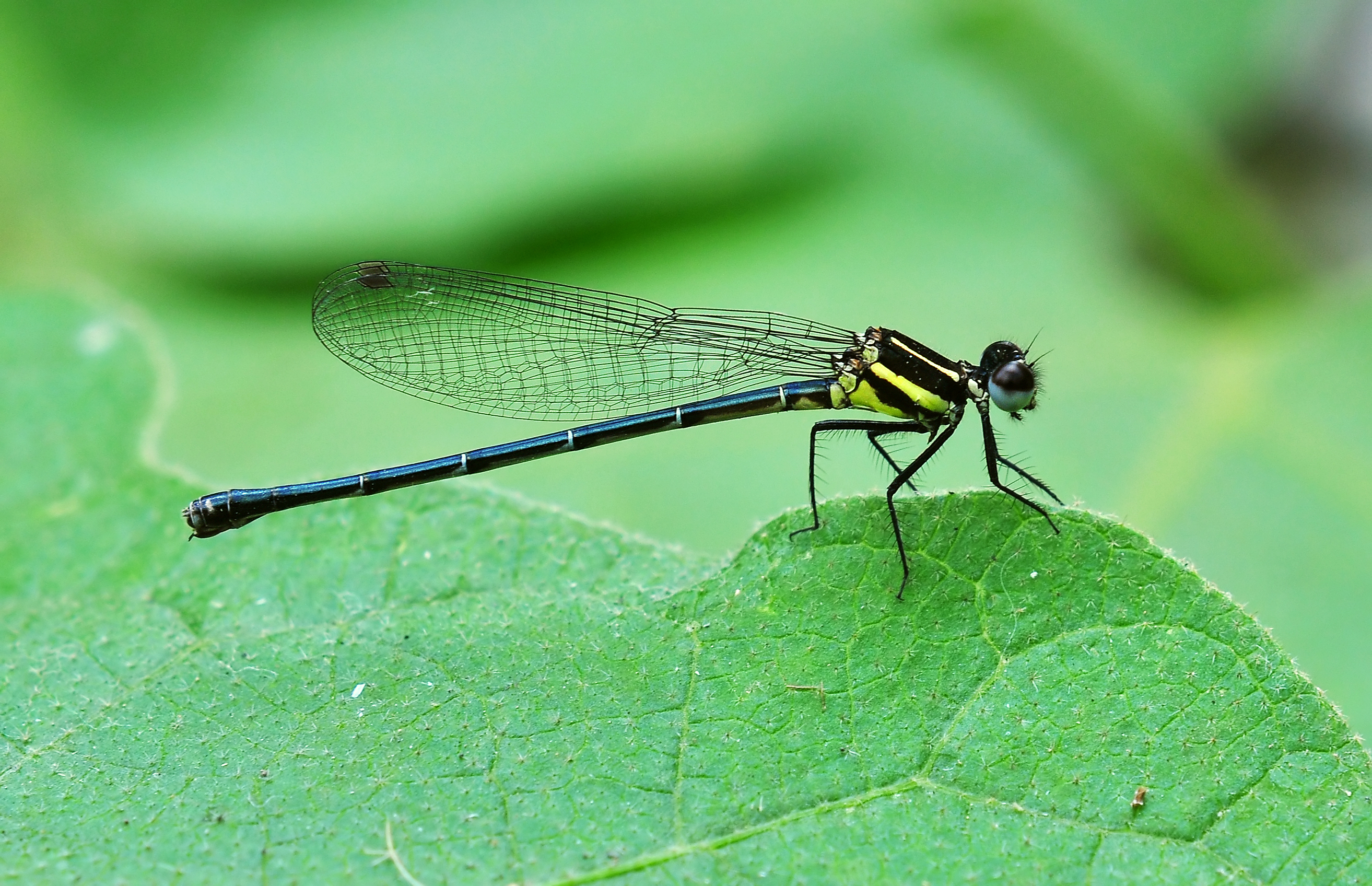
female

==== Genus: Phylloneura ====
===== Species: Phylloneura westermanni =====
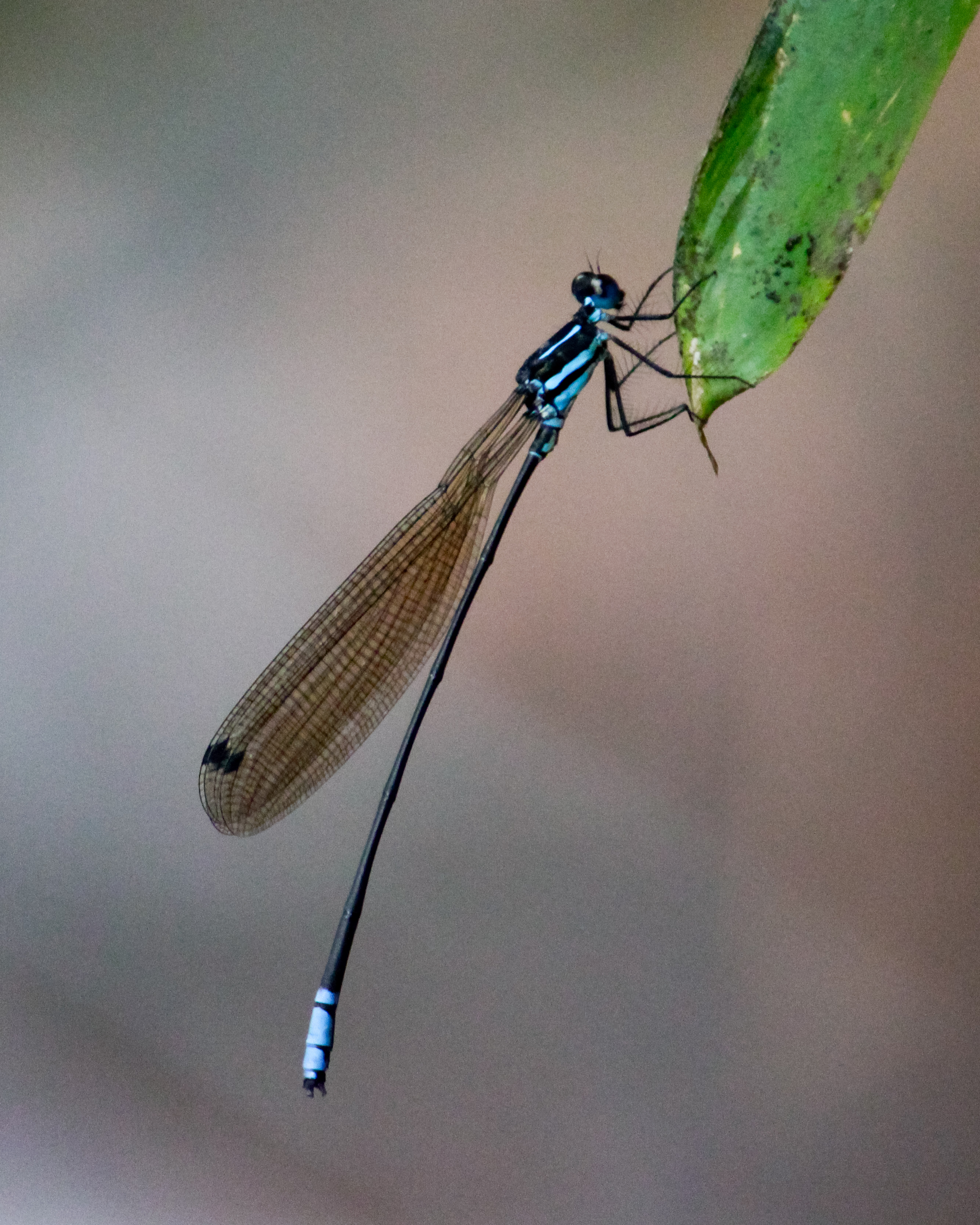
Phylloneura westermanni male

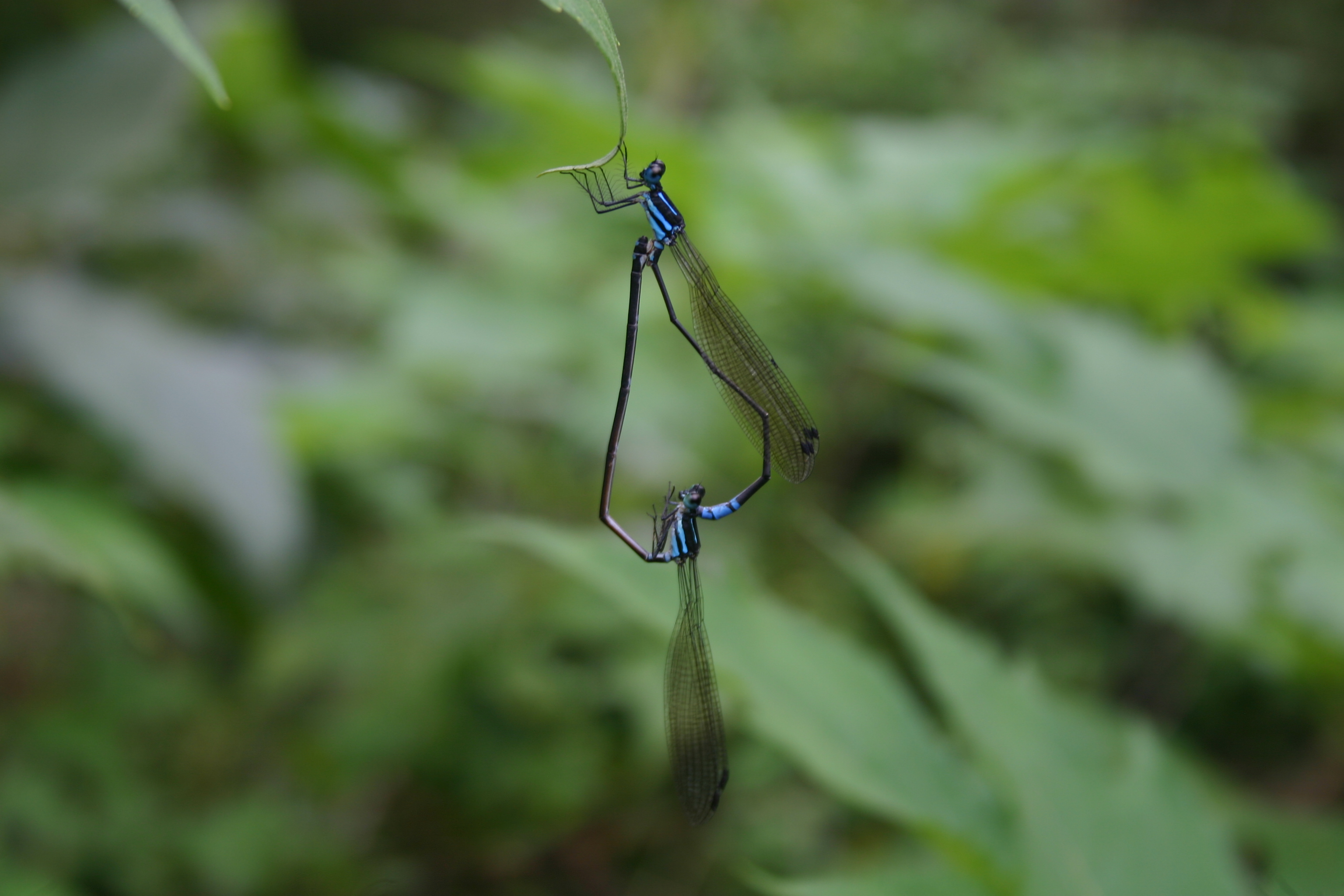
Phylloneura westermanni mating pair

==== Genus: Prodasineura ====
===== Species: Prodasineura verticalis =====
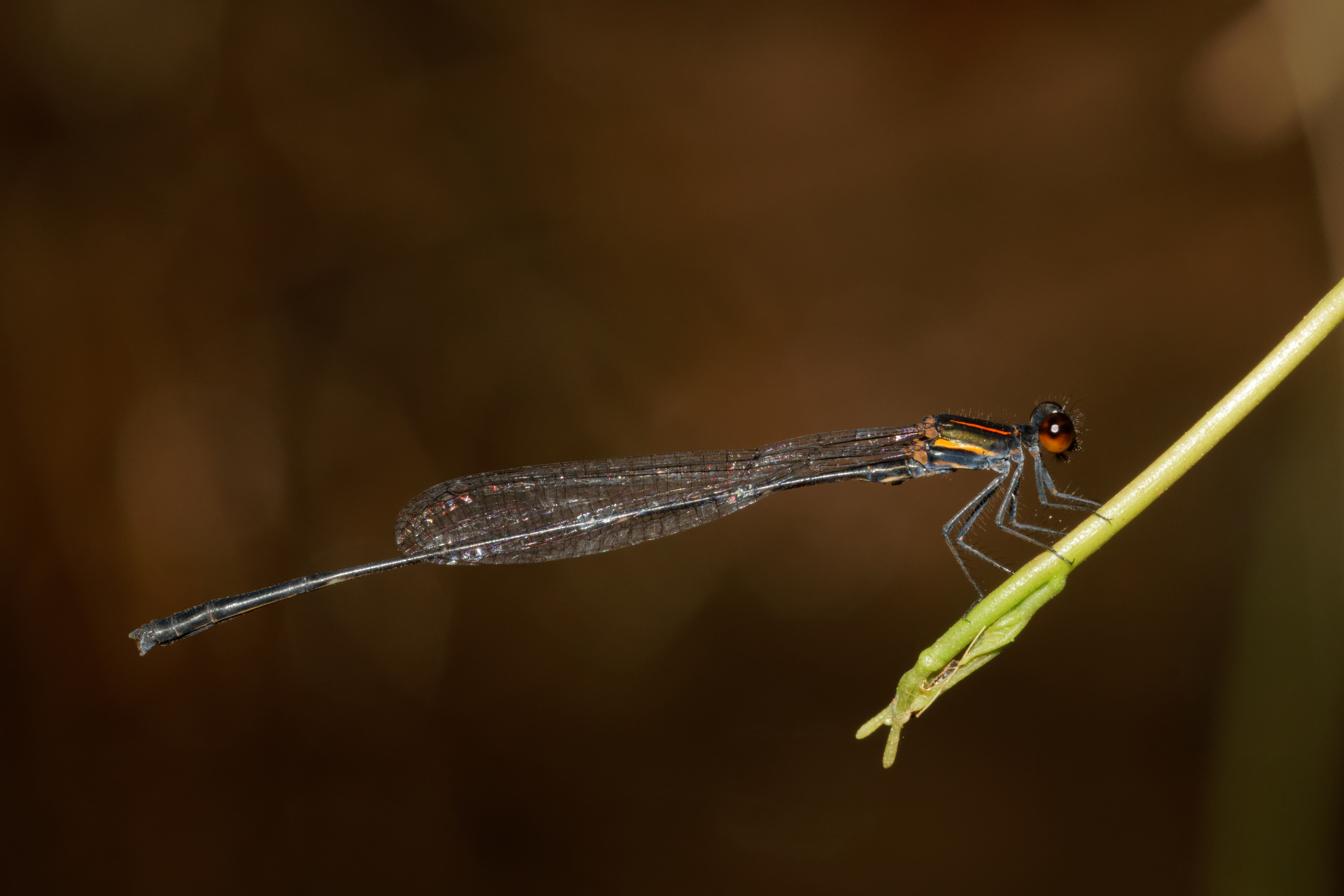
Prodasineura verticalis male

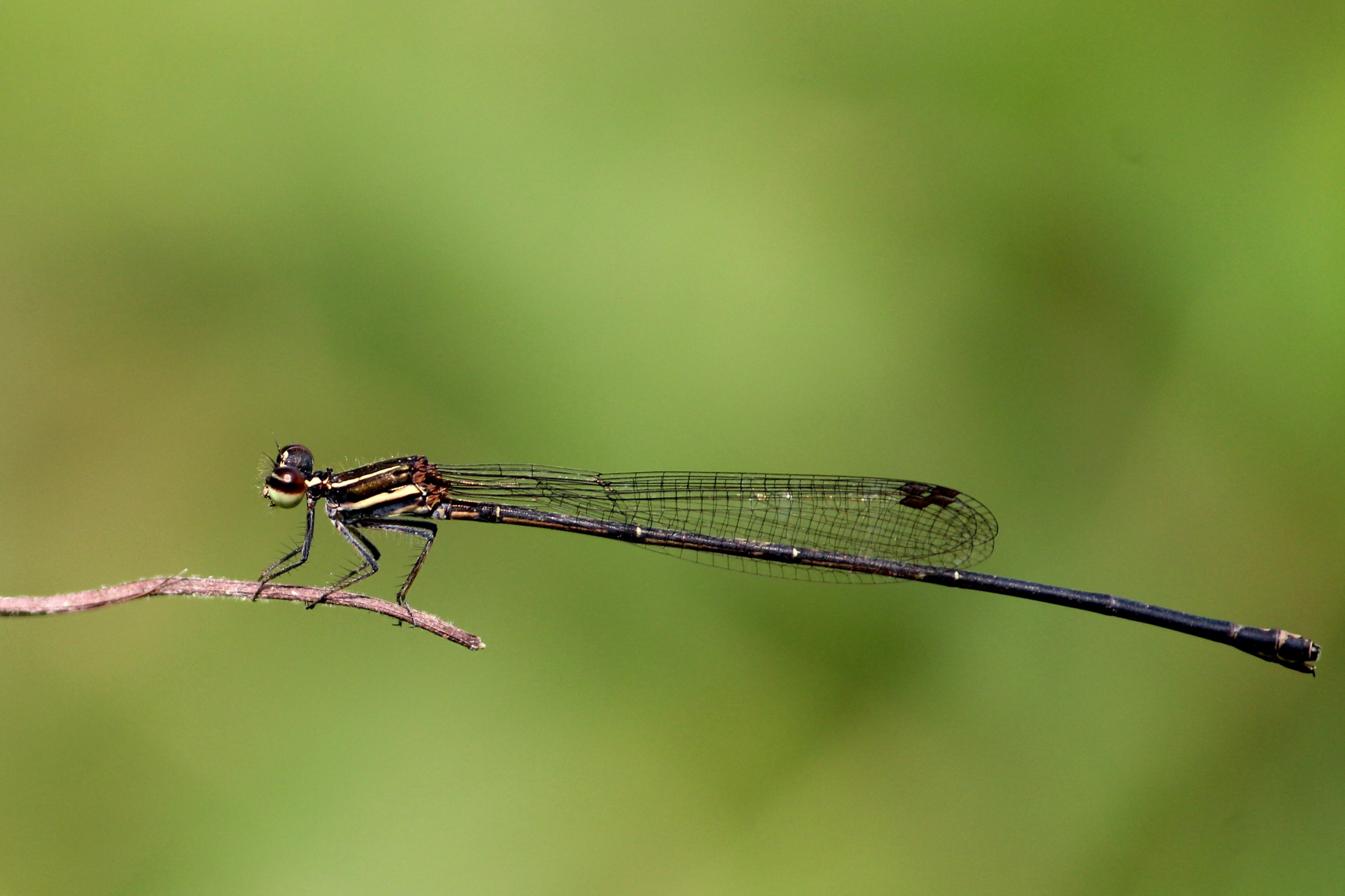
Prodasineura verticalis female

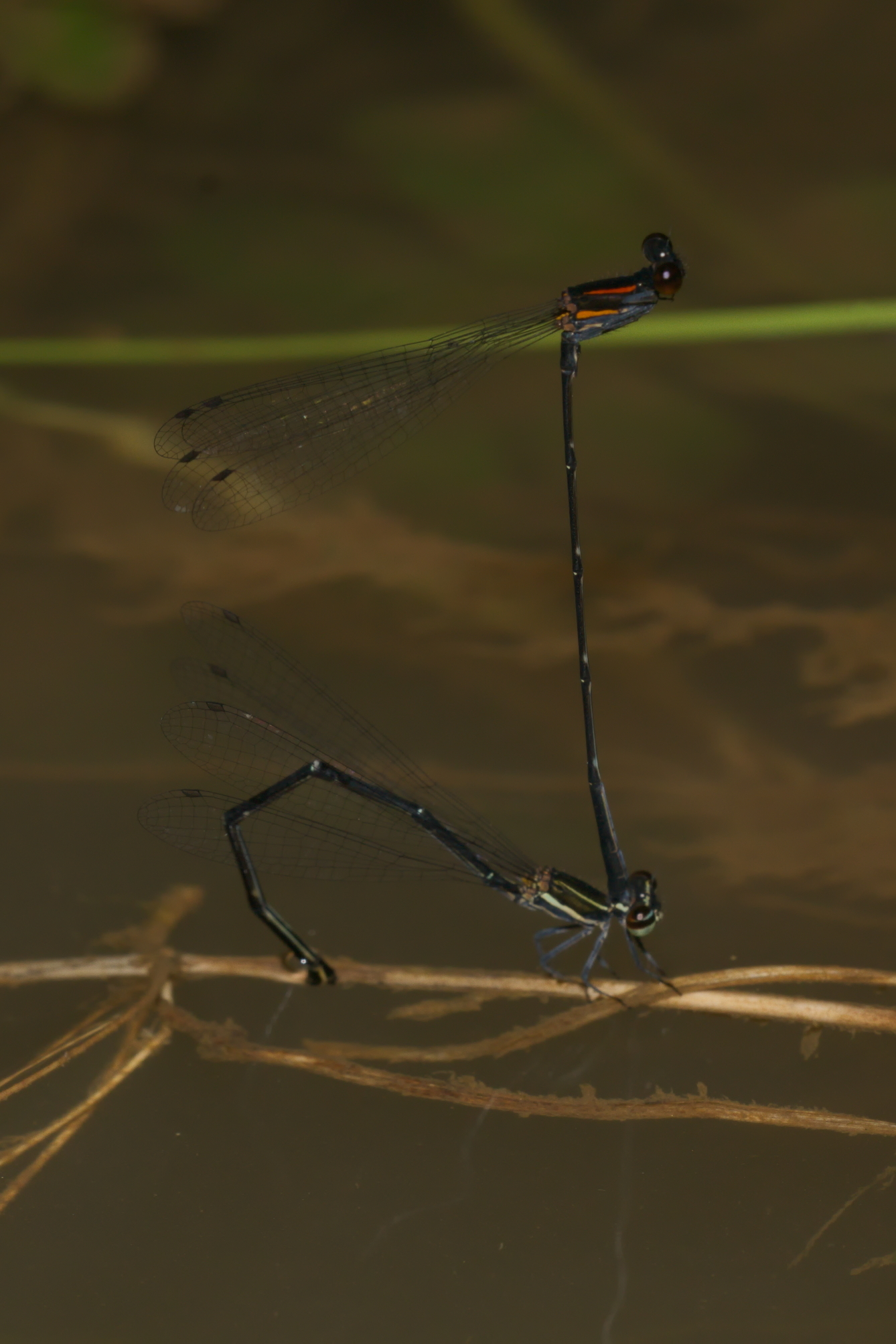
Prodasineura verticalis egg-laying

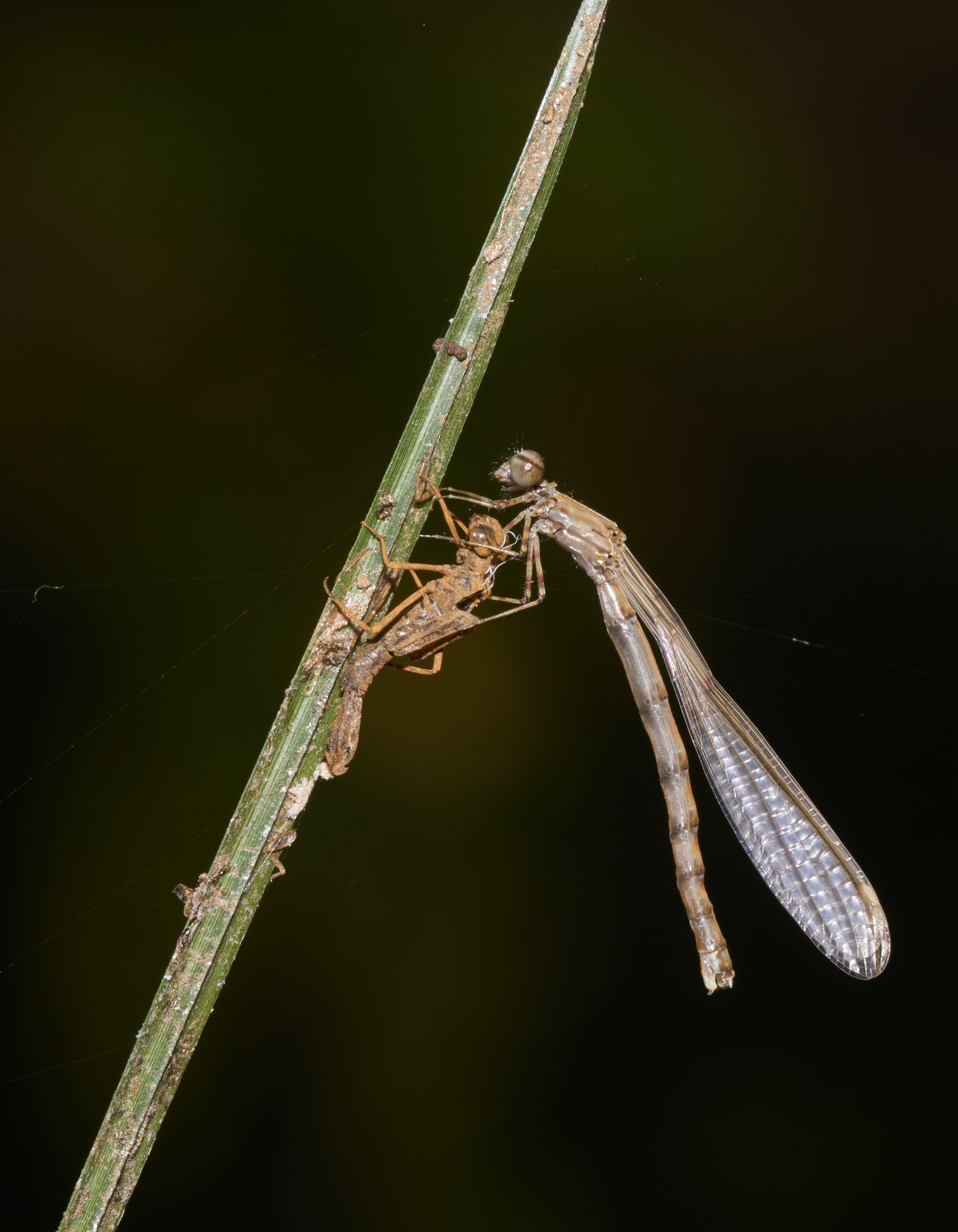
Prodasineura verticalis female (emergence)

=== Family: Coenagrionidae (Narrow-winged damselflies) ===
==== Genus: Aciagrion ====
===== Species: Aciagrion approximans krishna =====
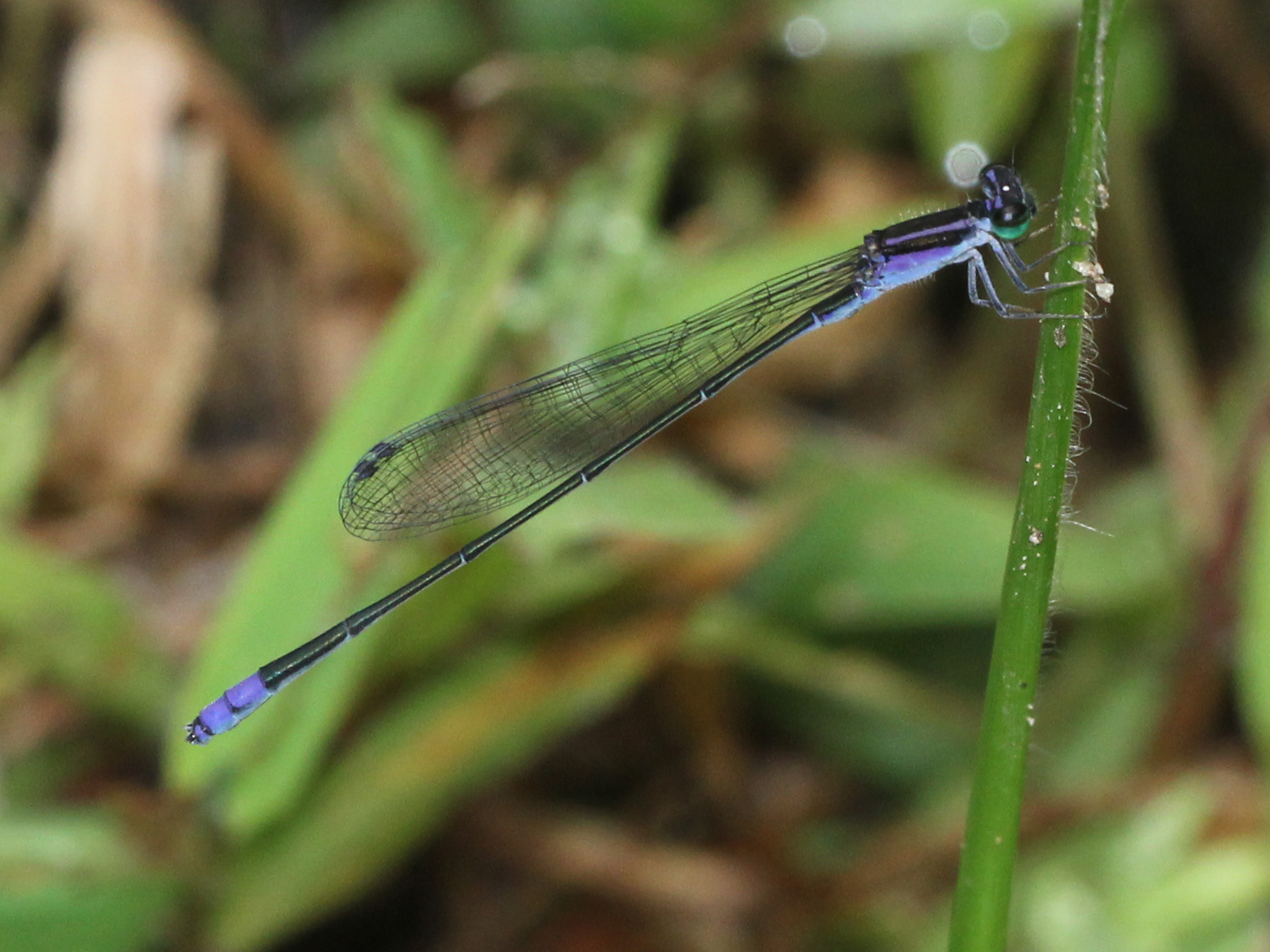
male

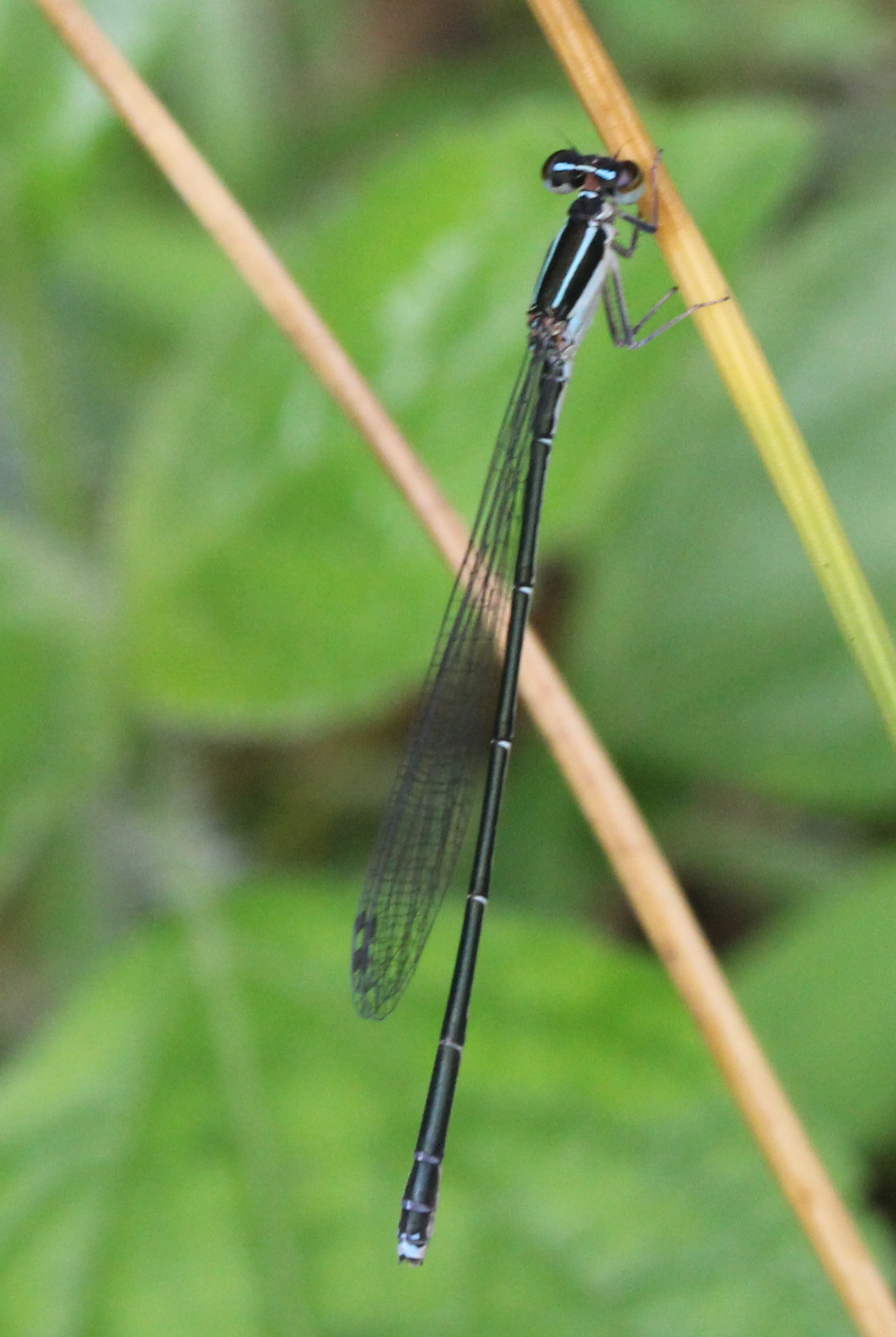
female

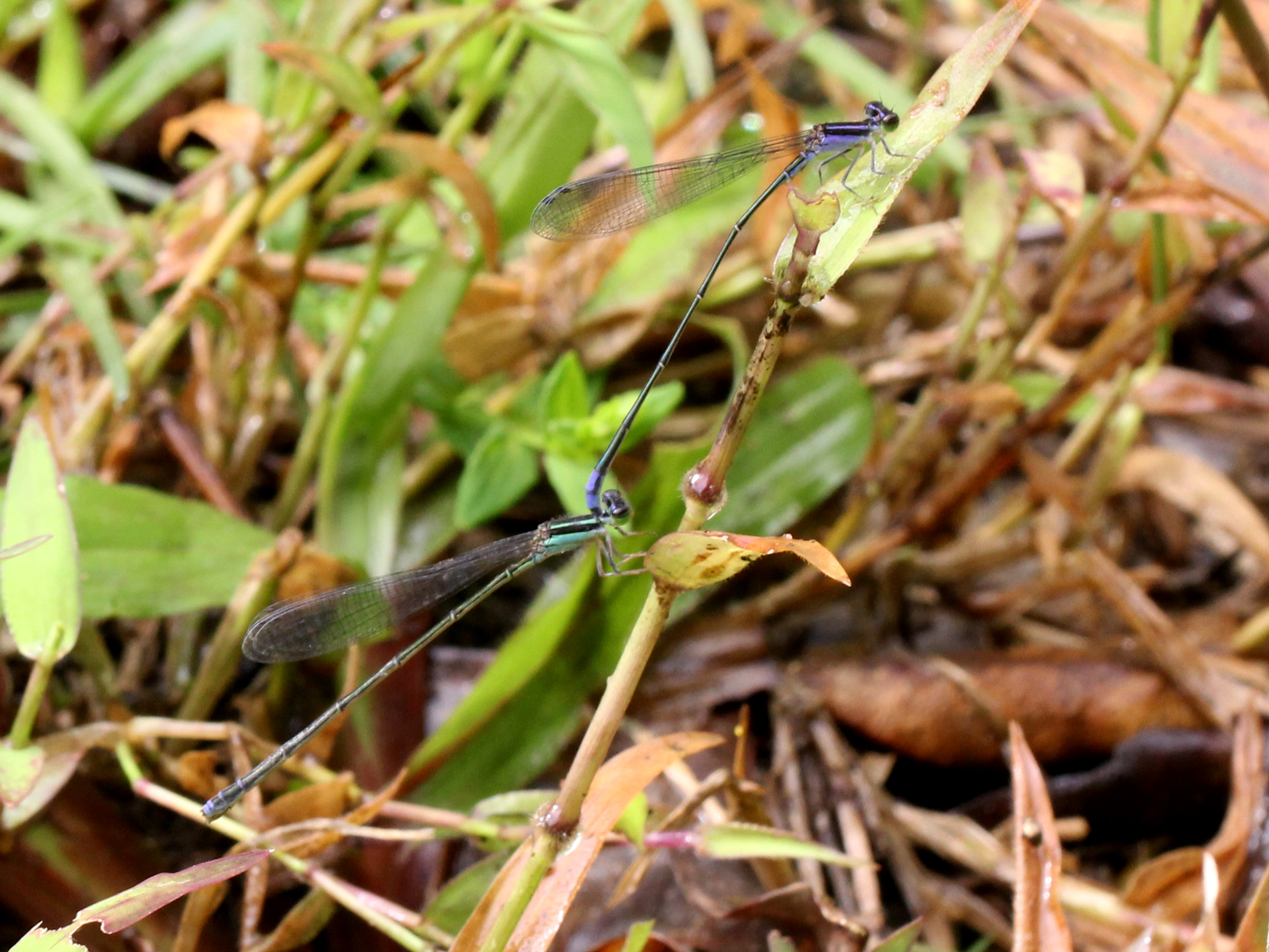
tandem pair

===== Species: Aciagrion occidentale =====
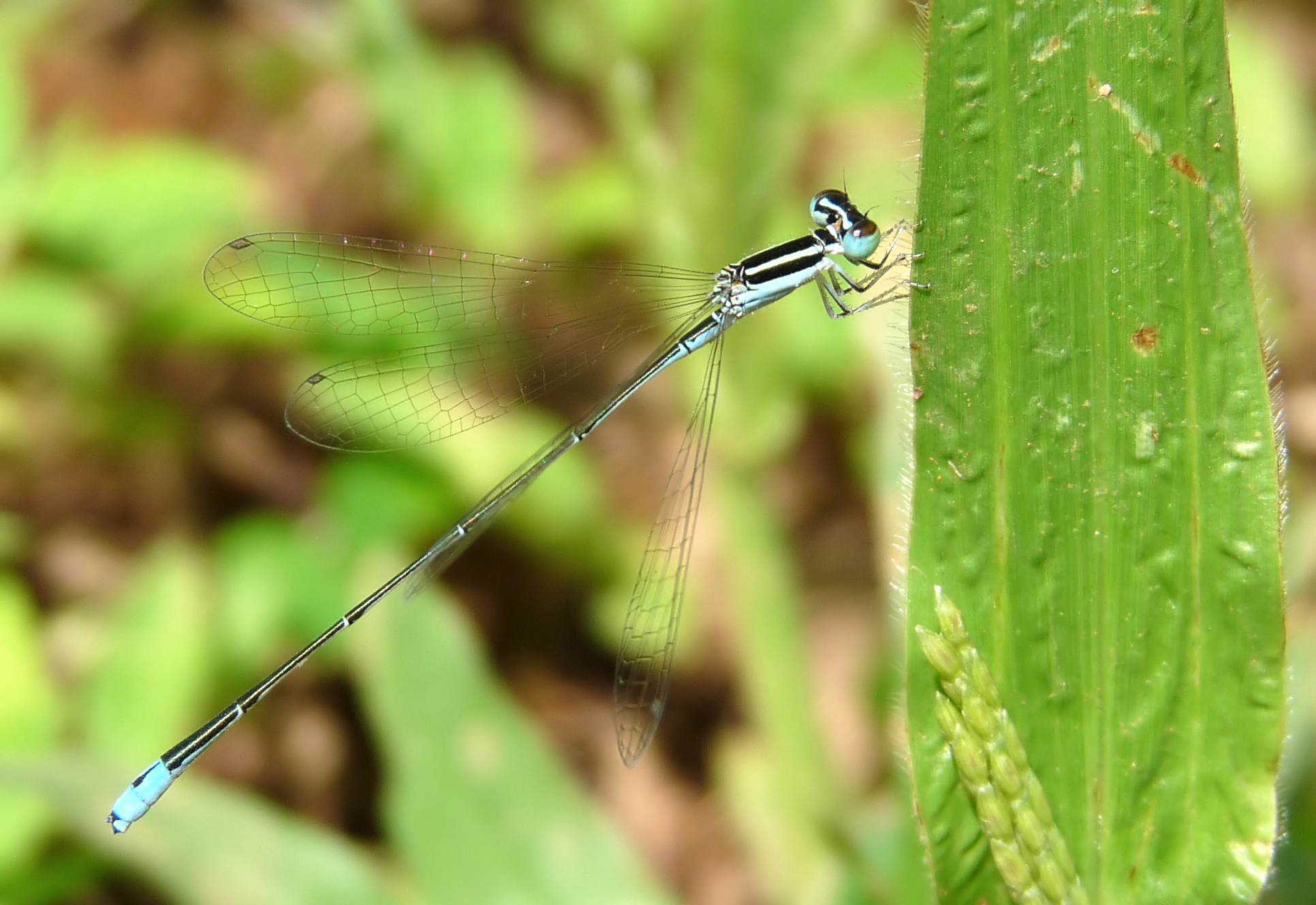
Aciagrion occidentale male

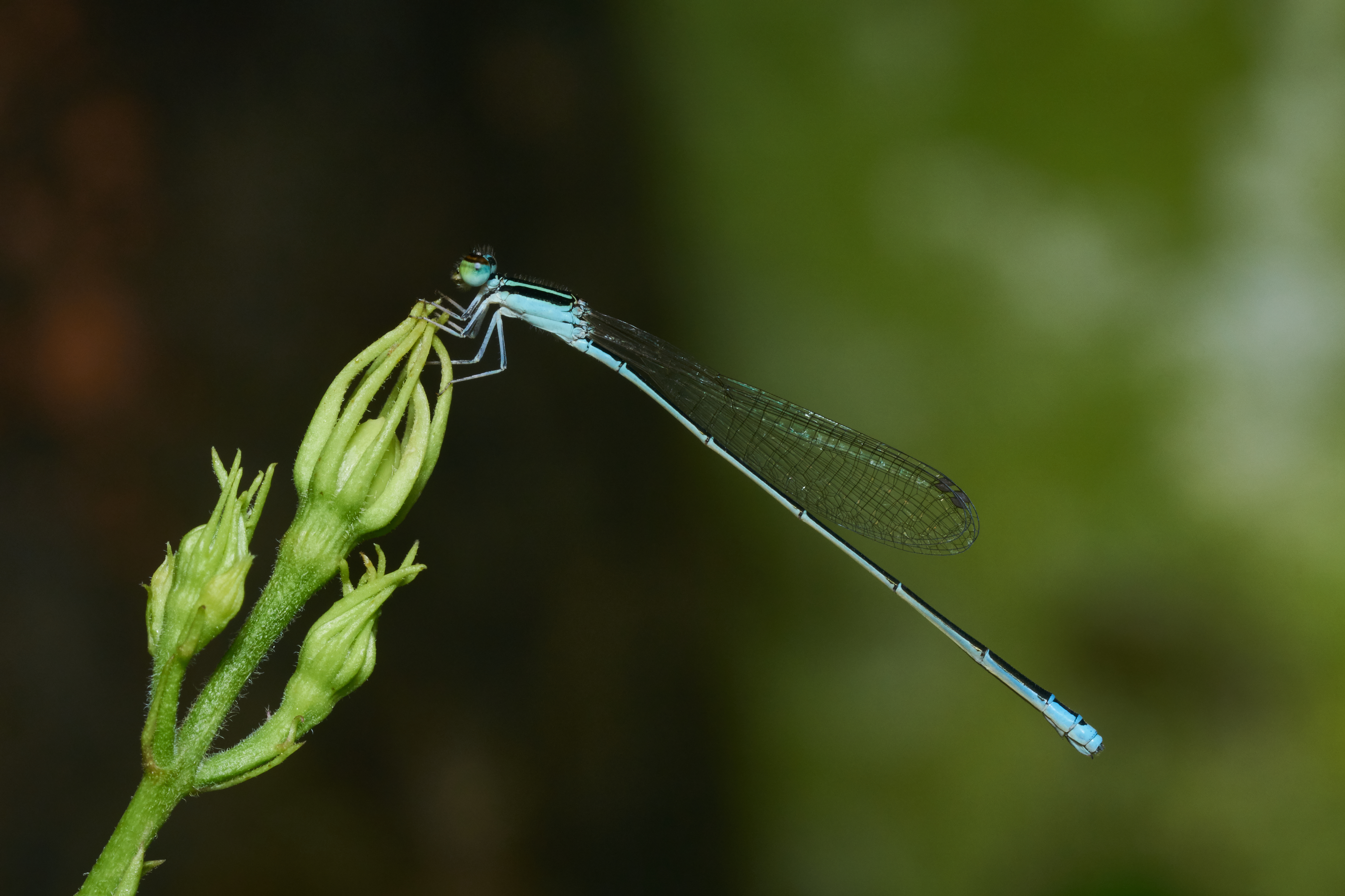
female

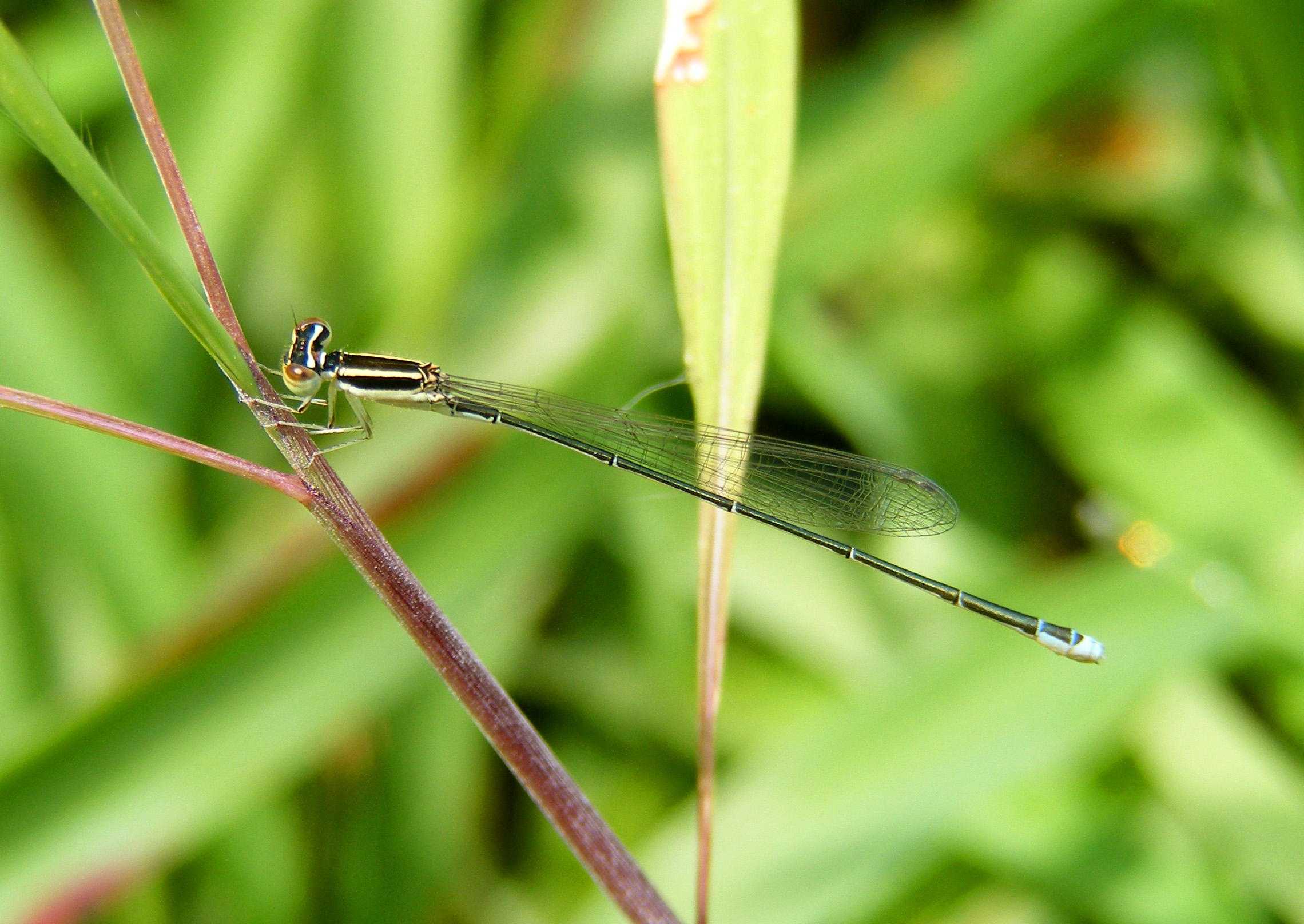
Aciagrion occidentale female (sub-adult)

==== Genus: Agriocnemis ====
===== Species: Agriocnemis keralensis =====
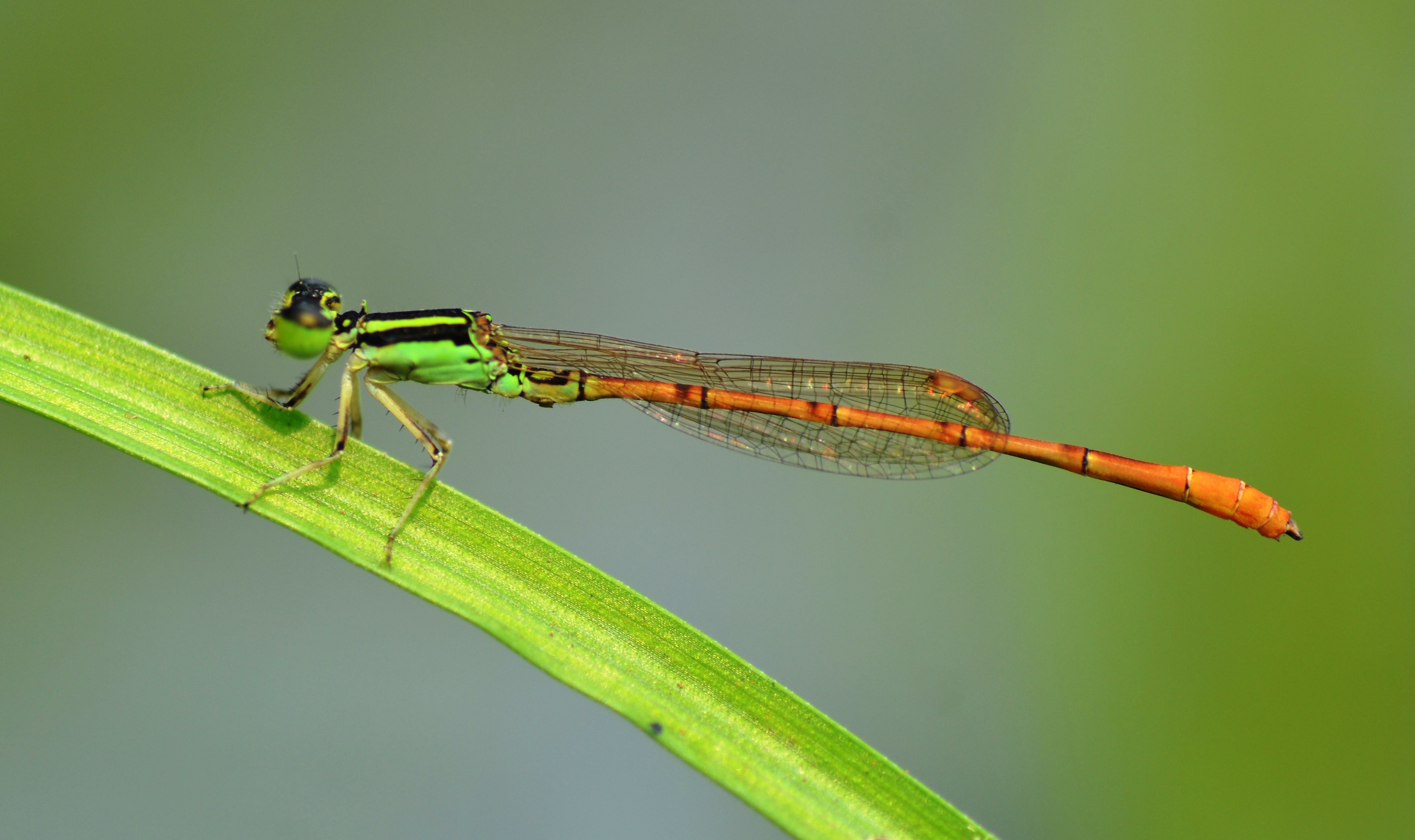
male

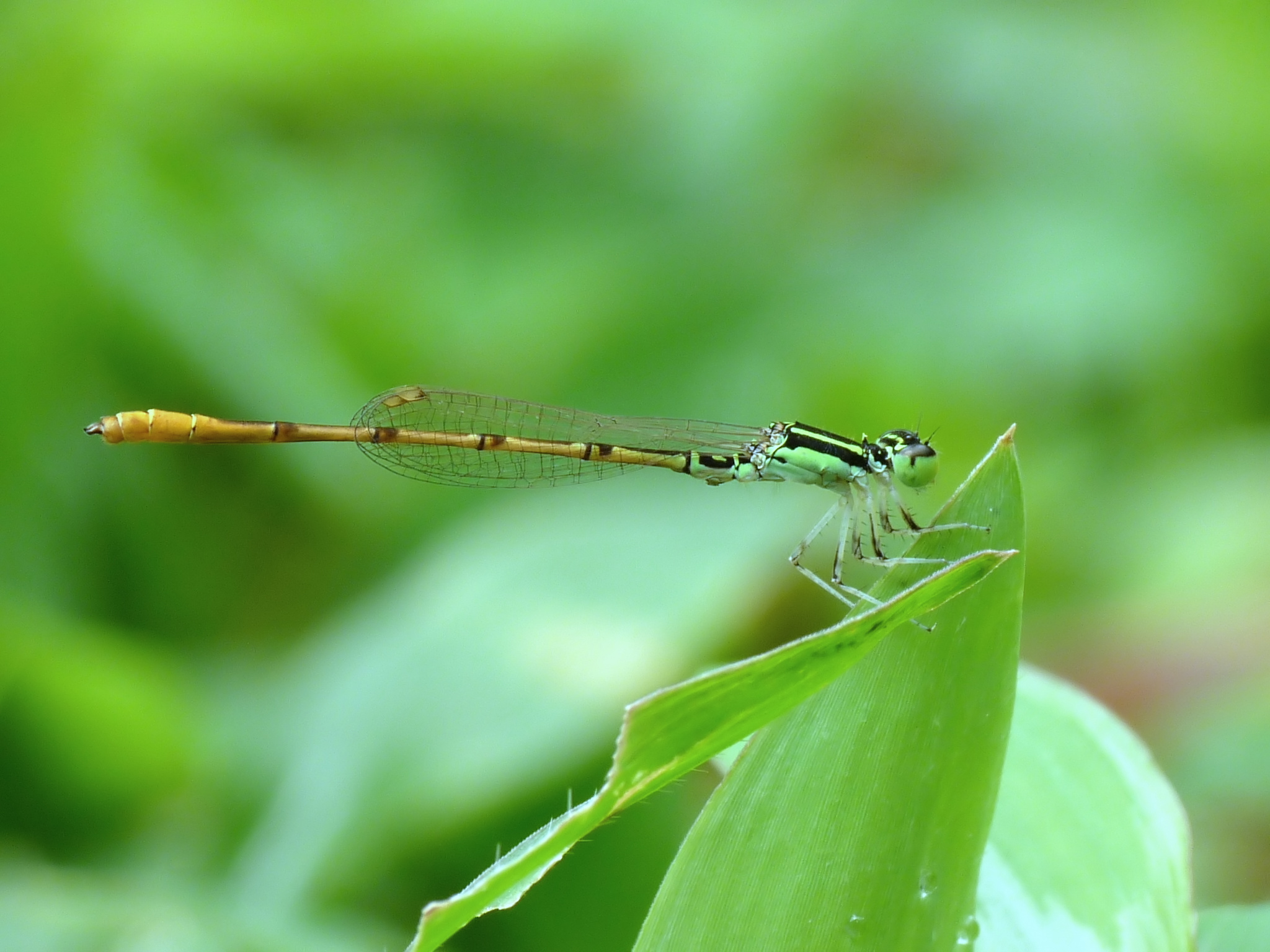
male

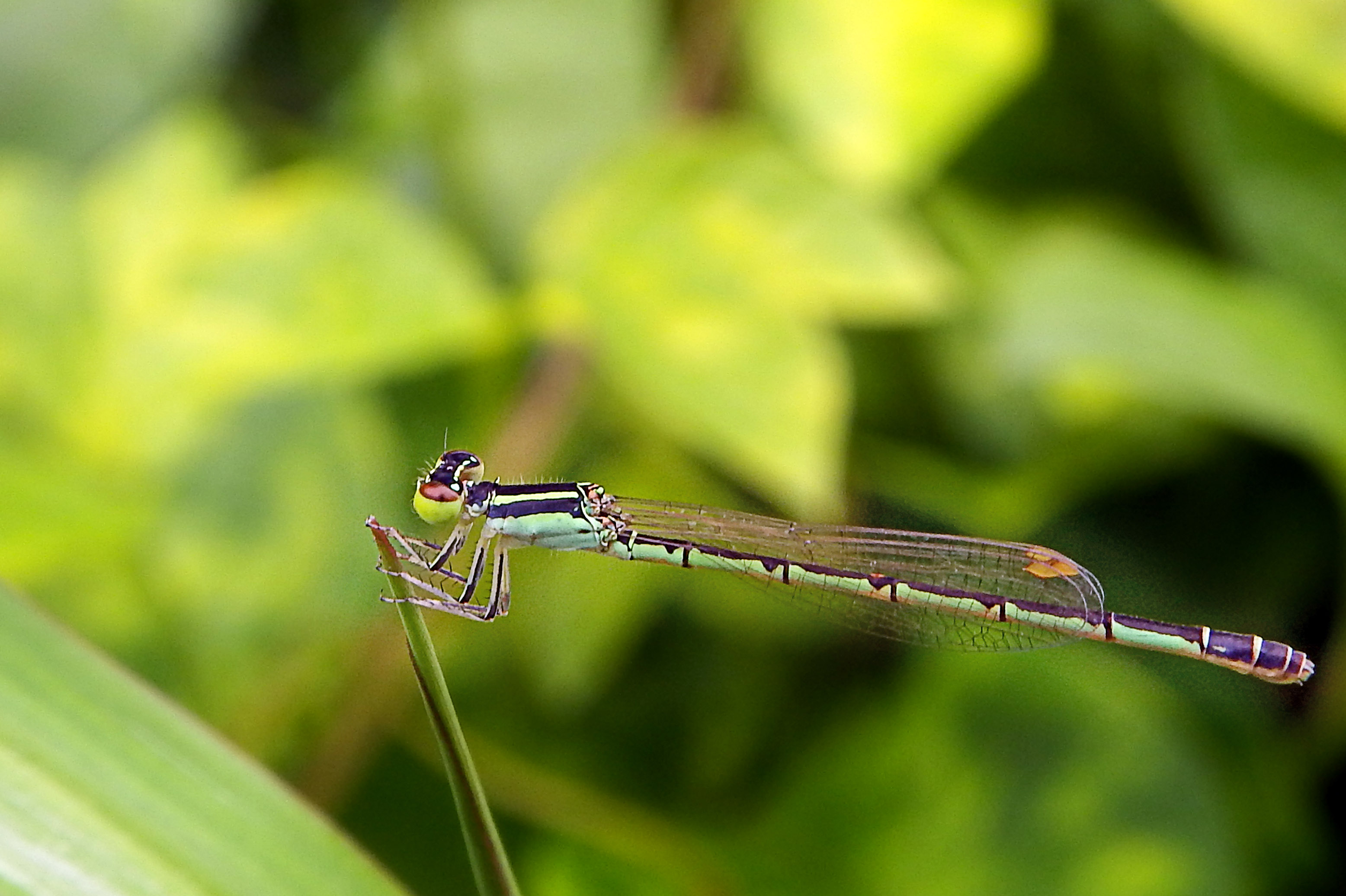
female

===== Species: Agriocnemis pieris =====
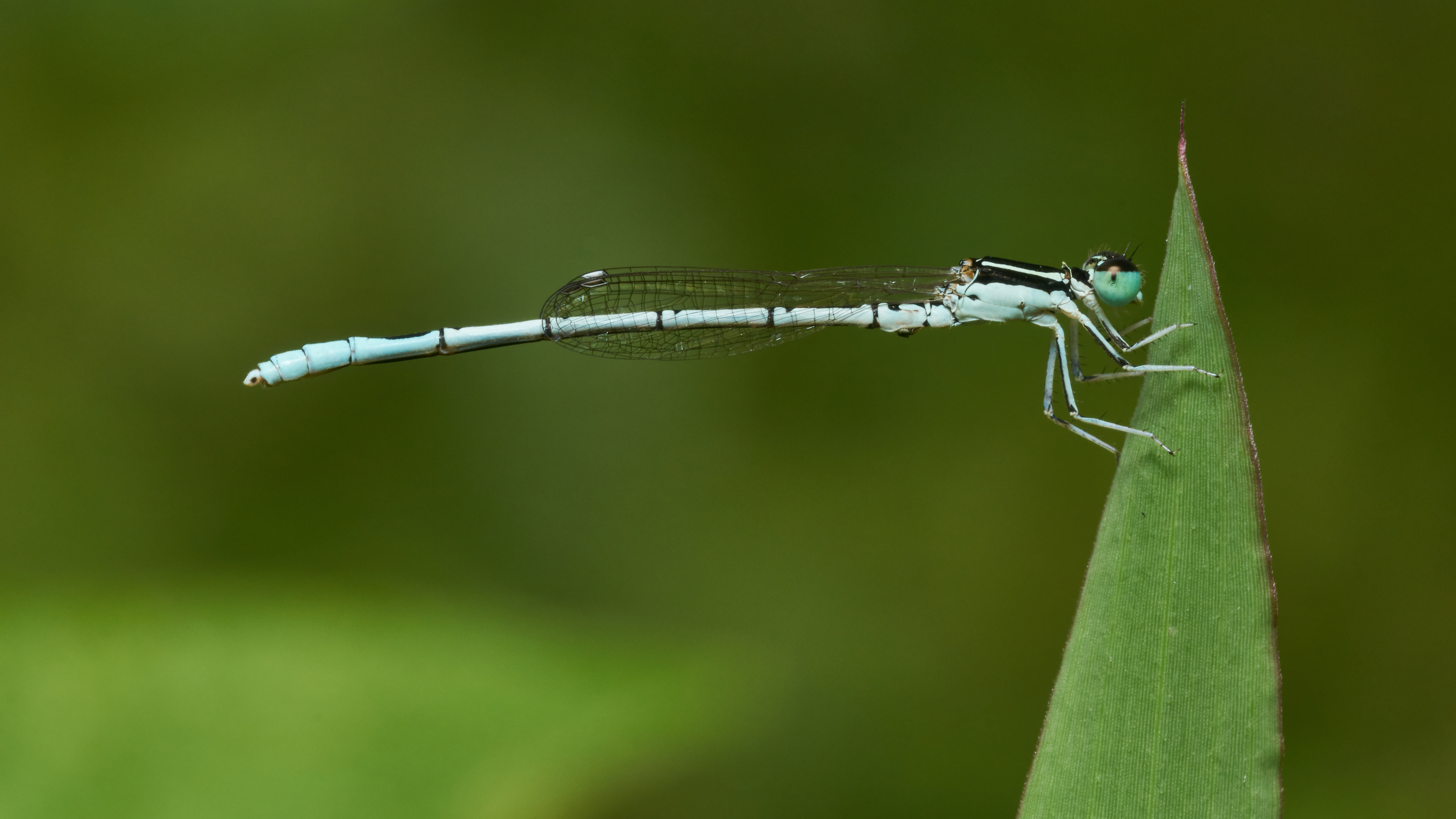
Agriocnemis pieris male

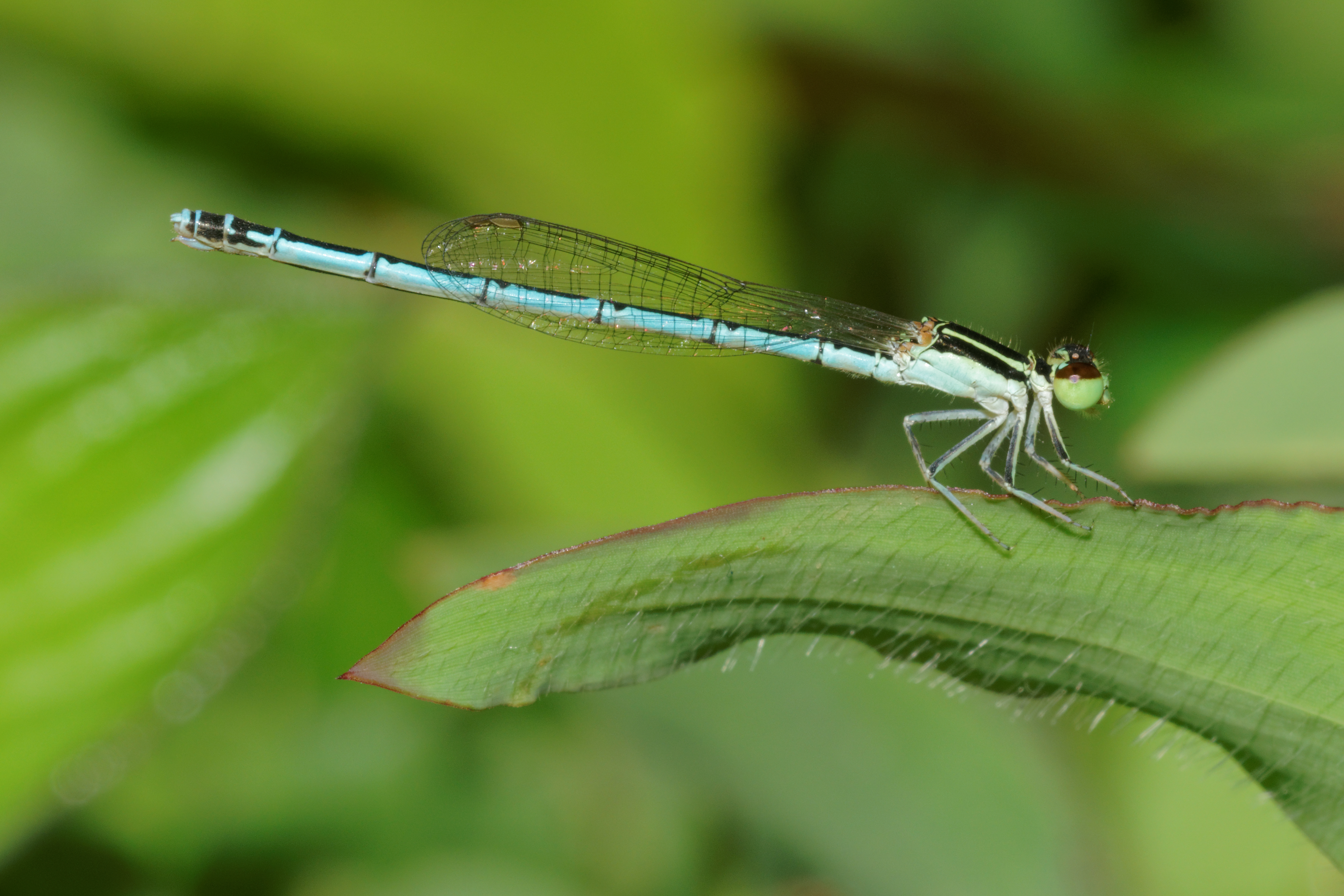
Agriocnemis pieris female

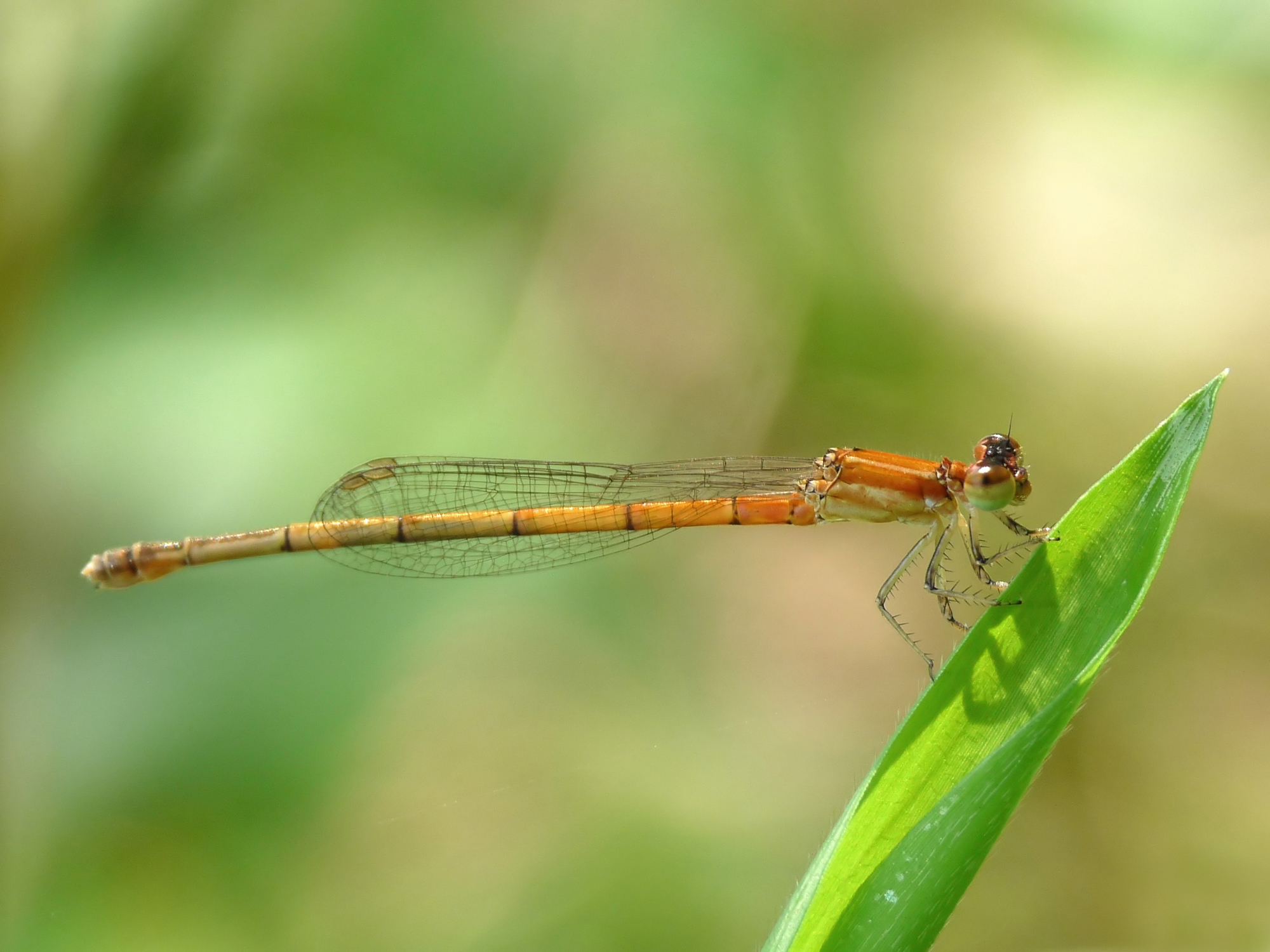
Agriocnemis pieris female (red form)

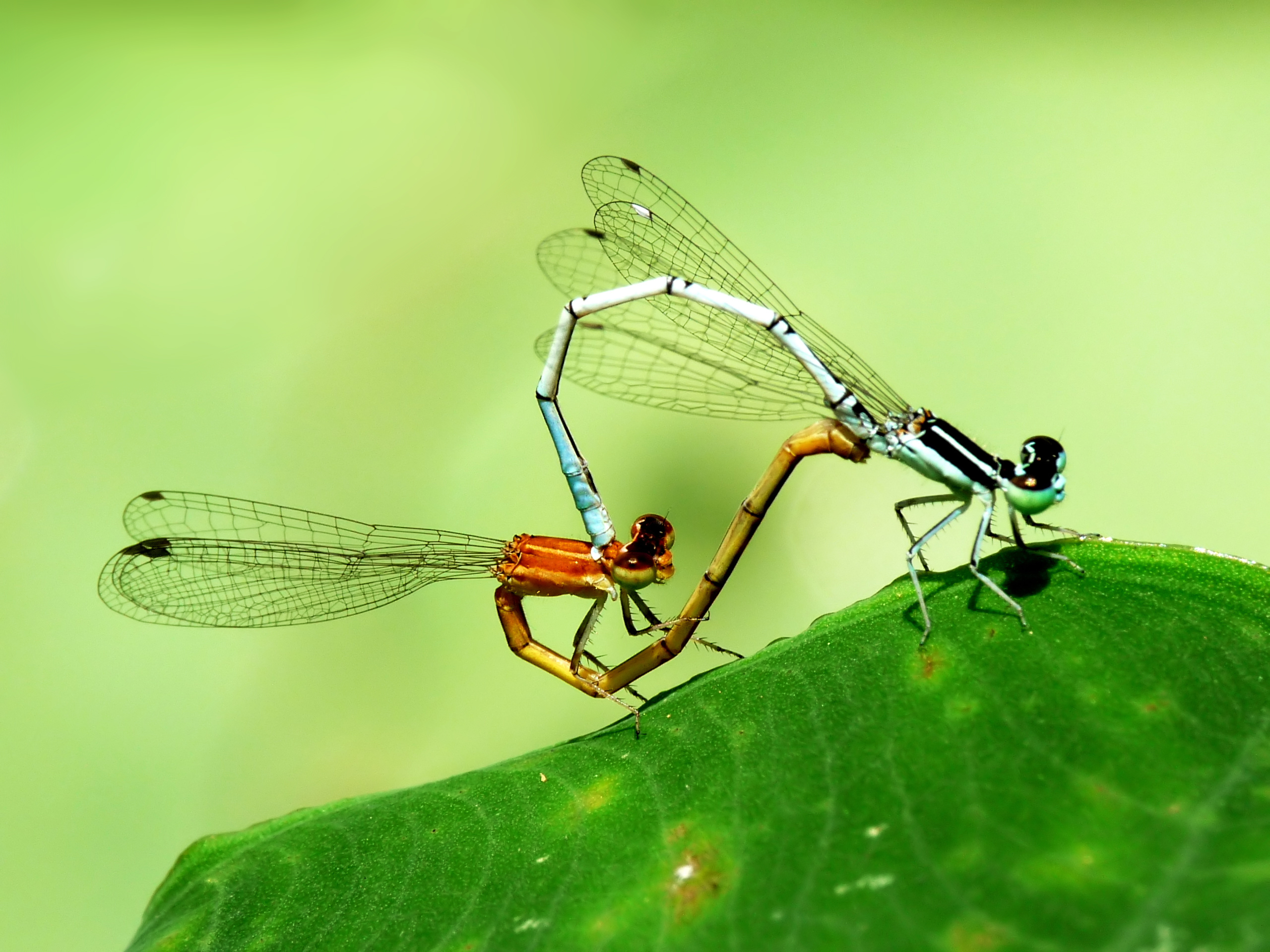
Agriocnemis pieris mating pair (female red form)

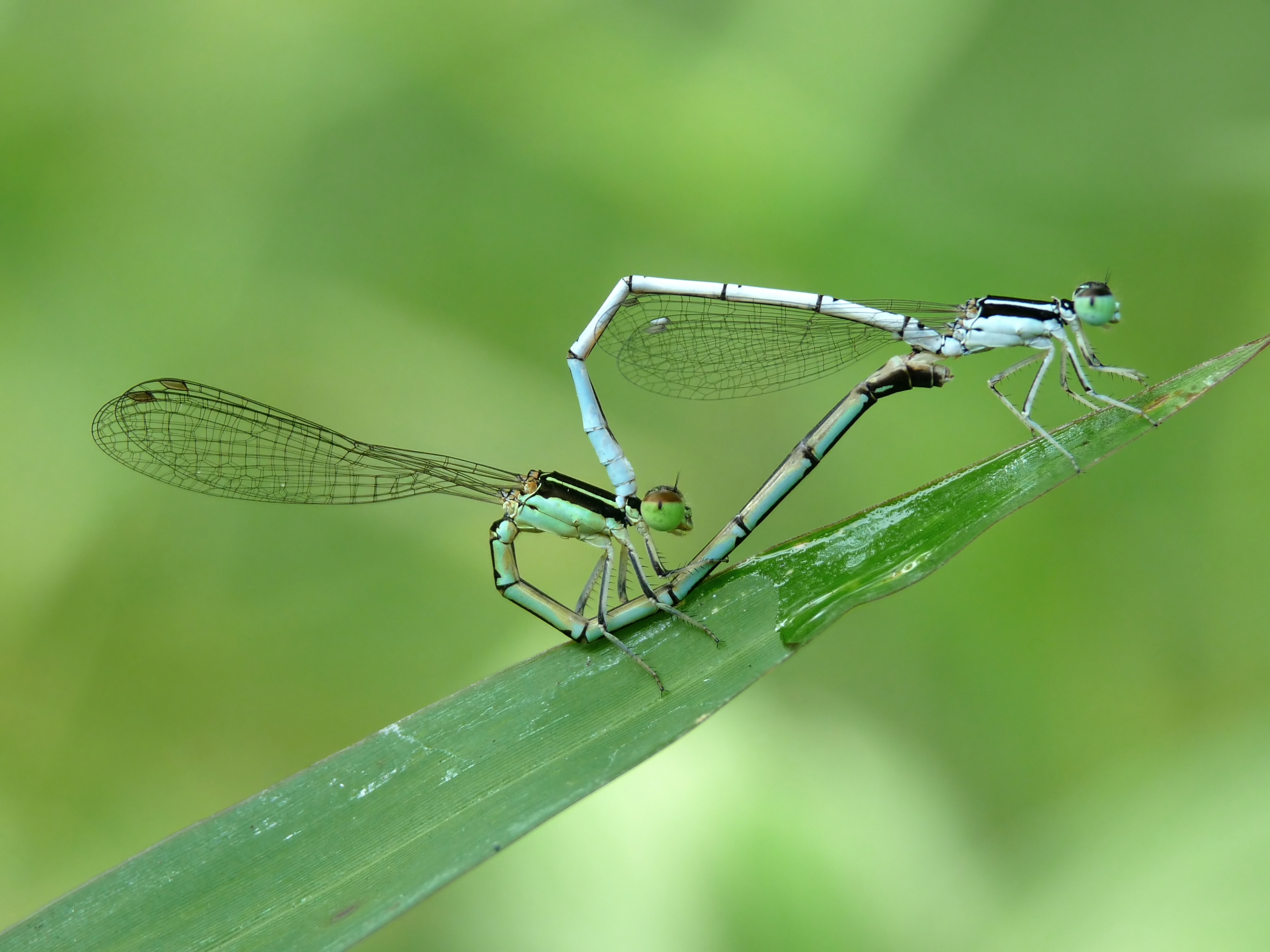
Agriocnemis pieris mating pair (female white form)

===== Species: Agriocnemis pygmaea =====
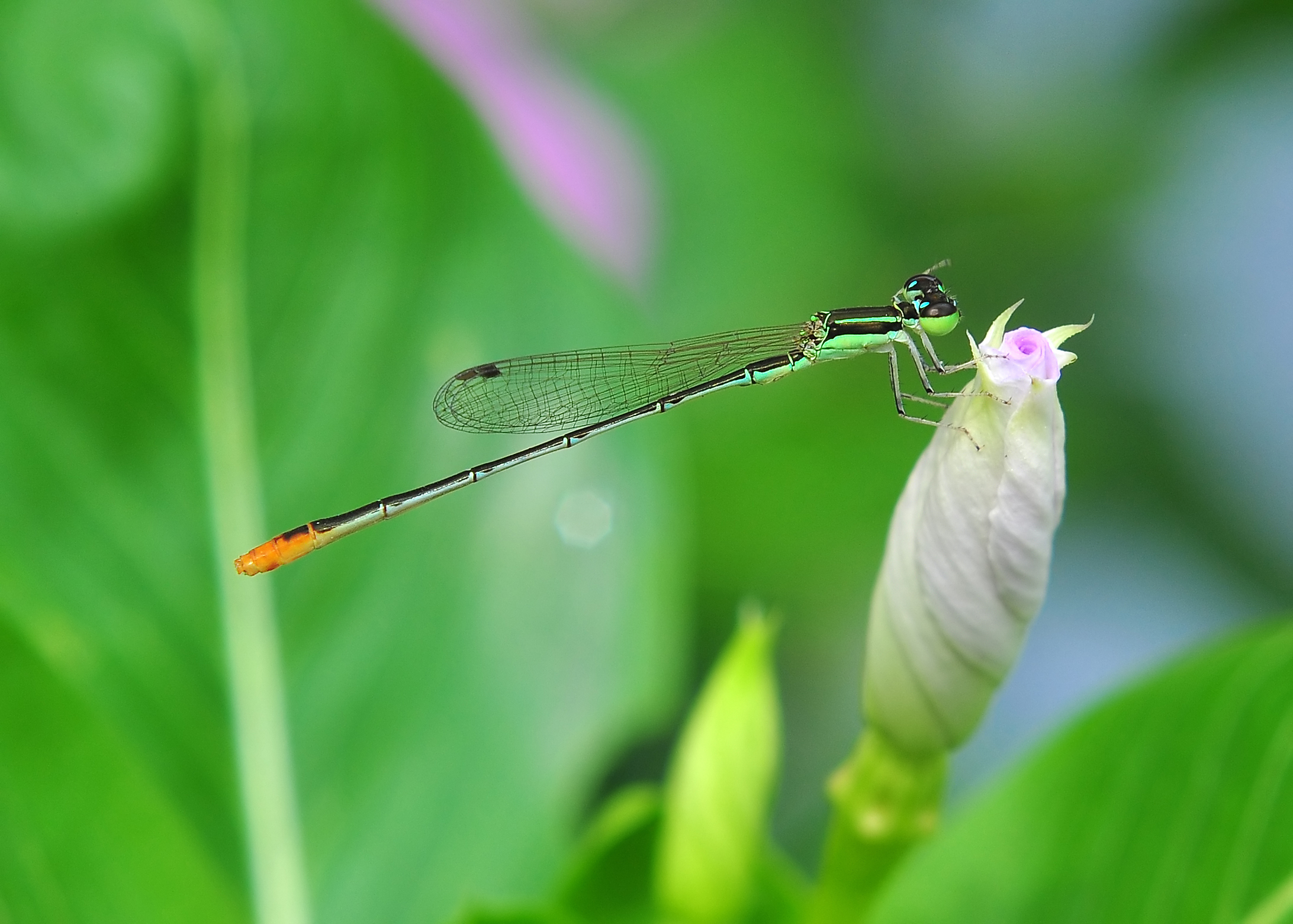
Agriocnemis pygmaea male

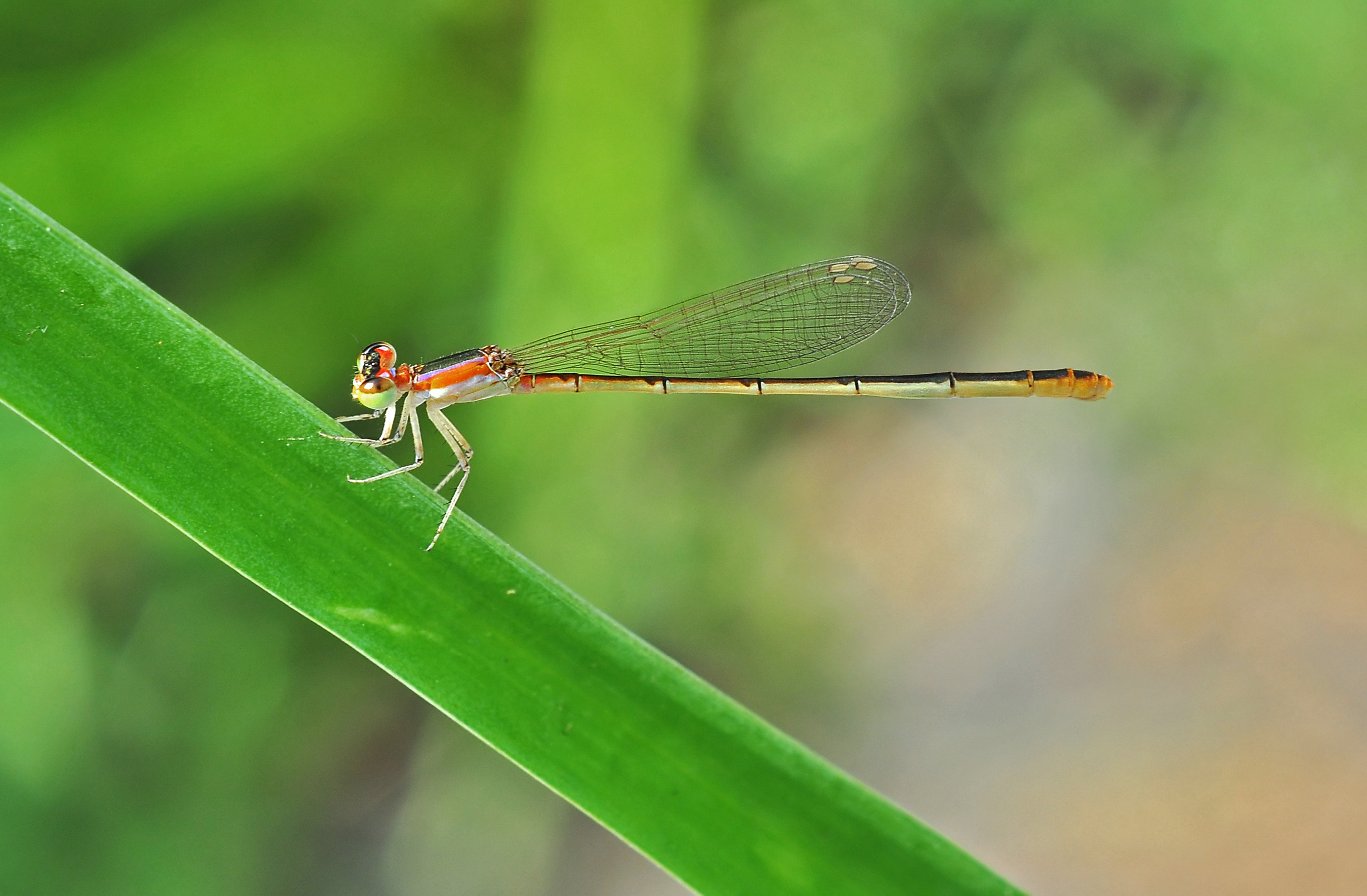
Agriocnemis pygmaea female

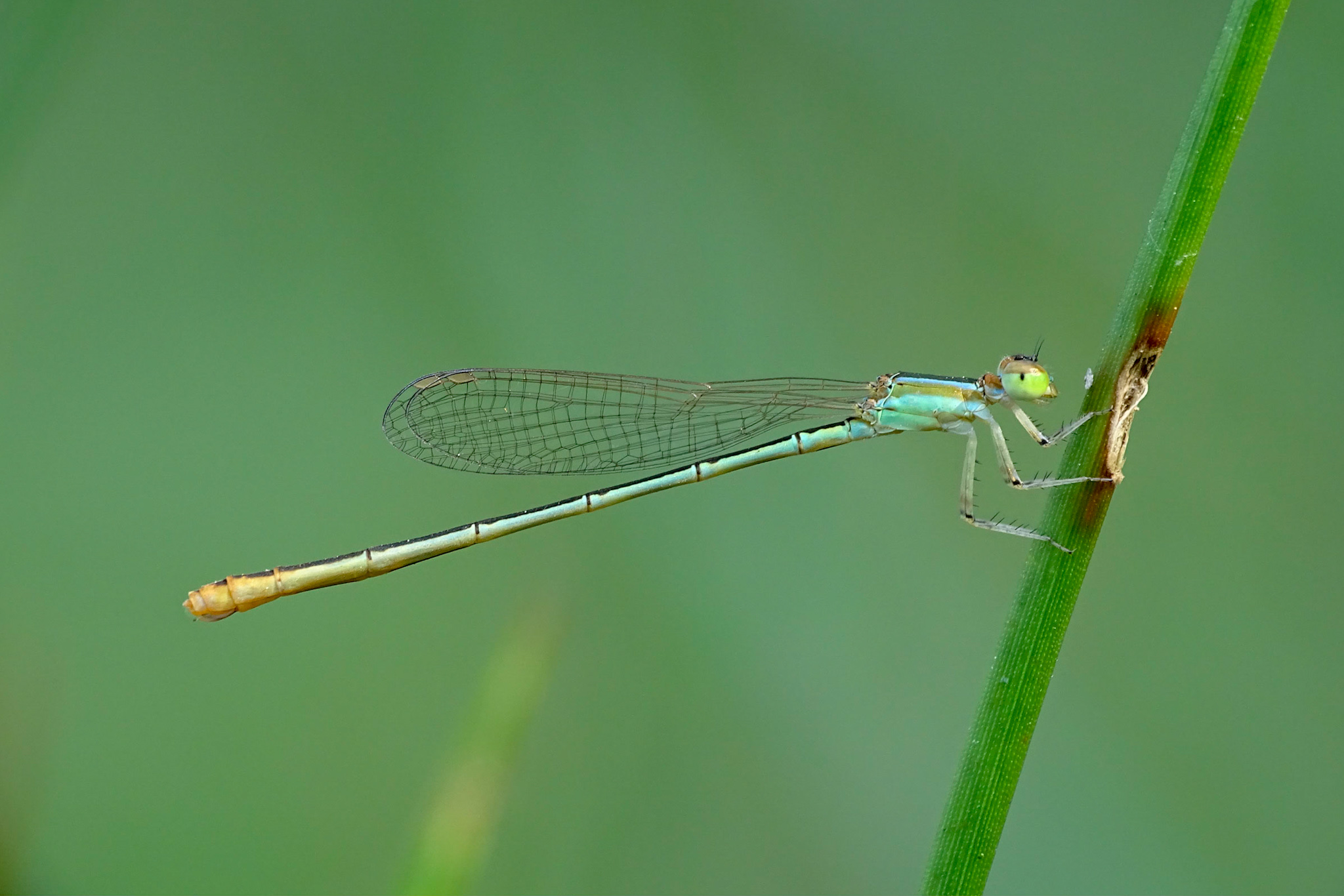
Agriocnemis pygmaea female (androchrome)

===== Species: Agriocnemis splendidissima =====
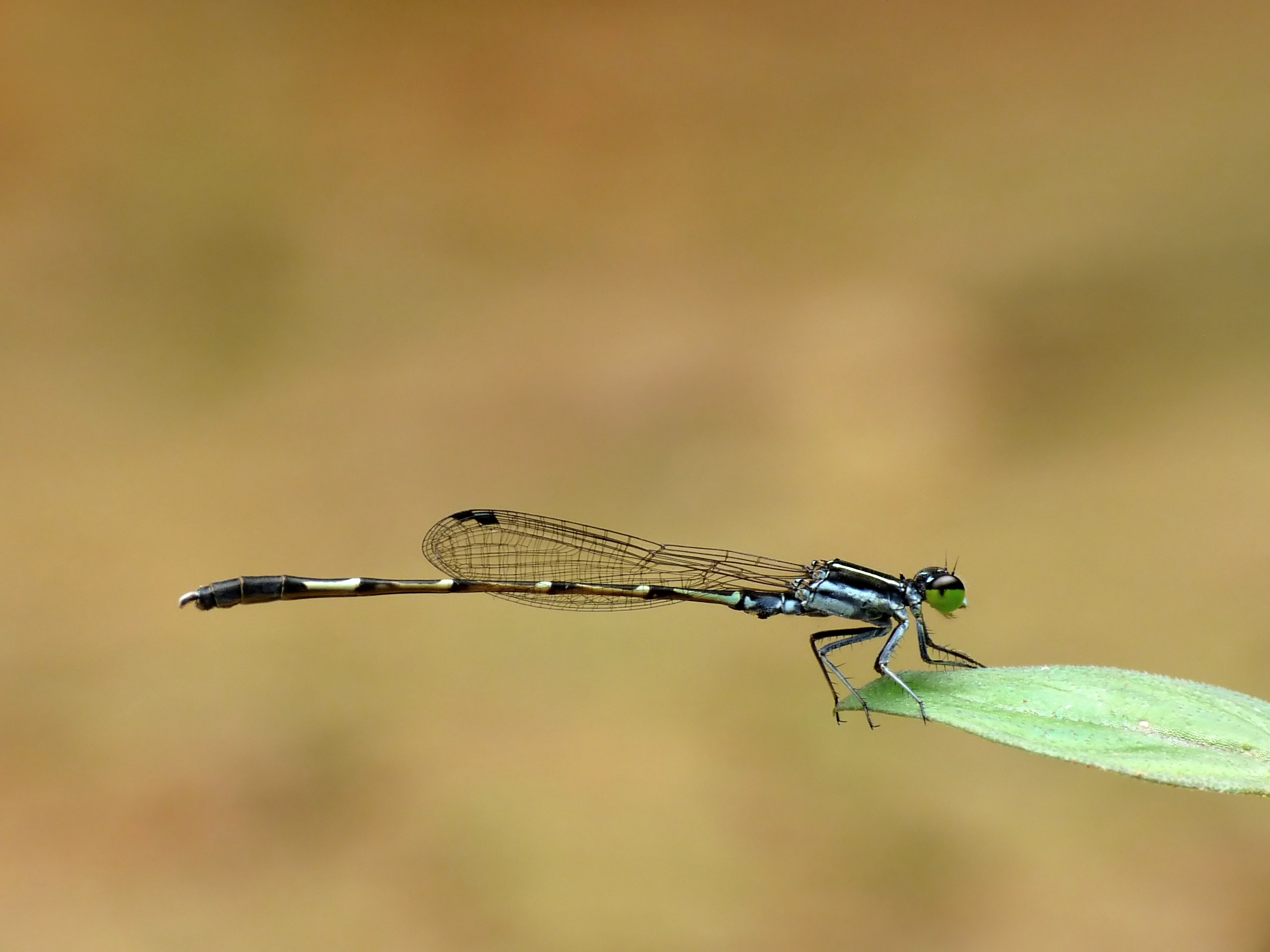
Agriocnemis splendidissima male

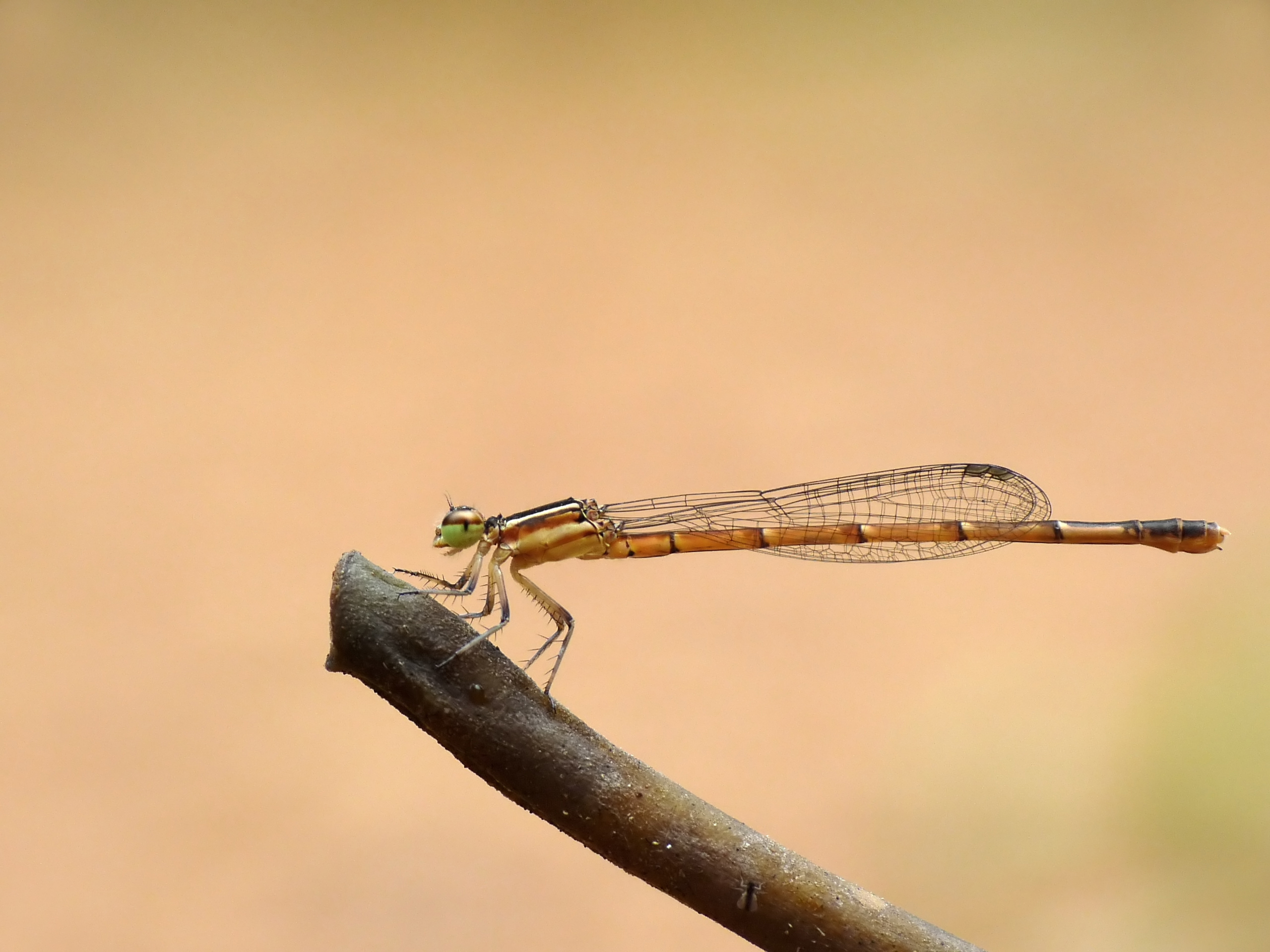
Agriocnemis splendidissima female (red)

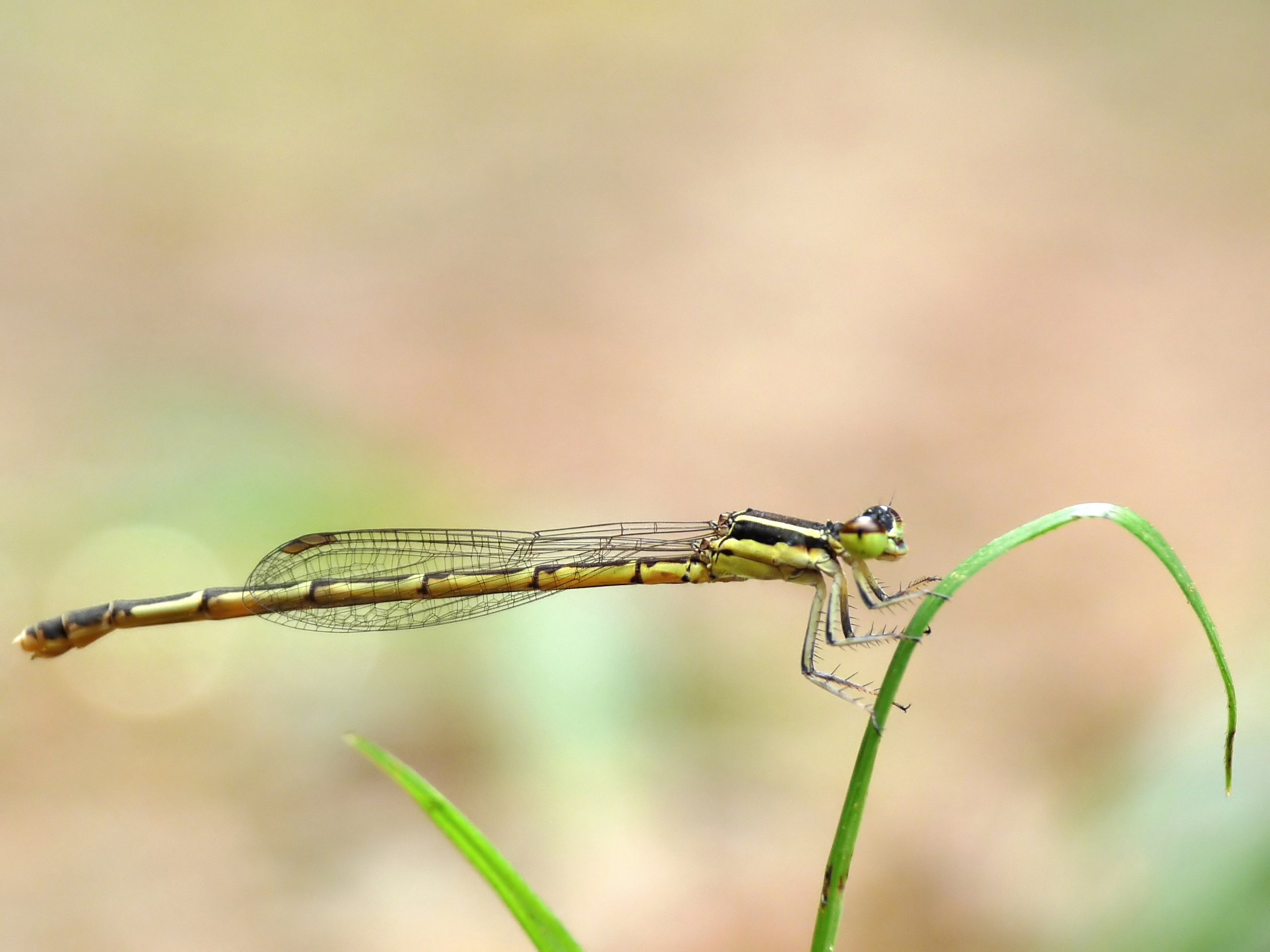
Agriocnemis splendidissima female (green)

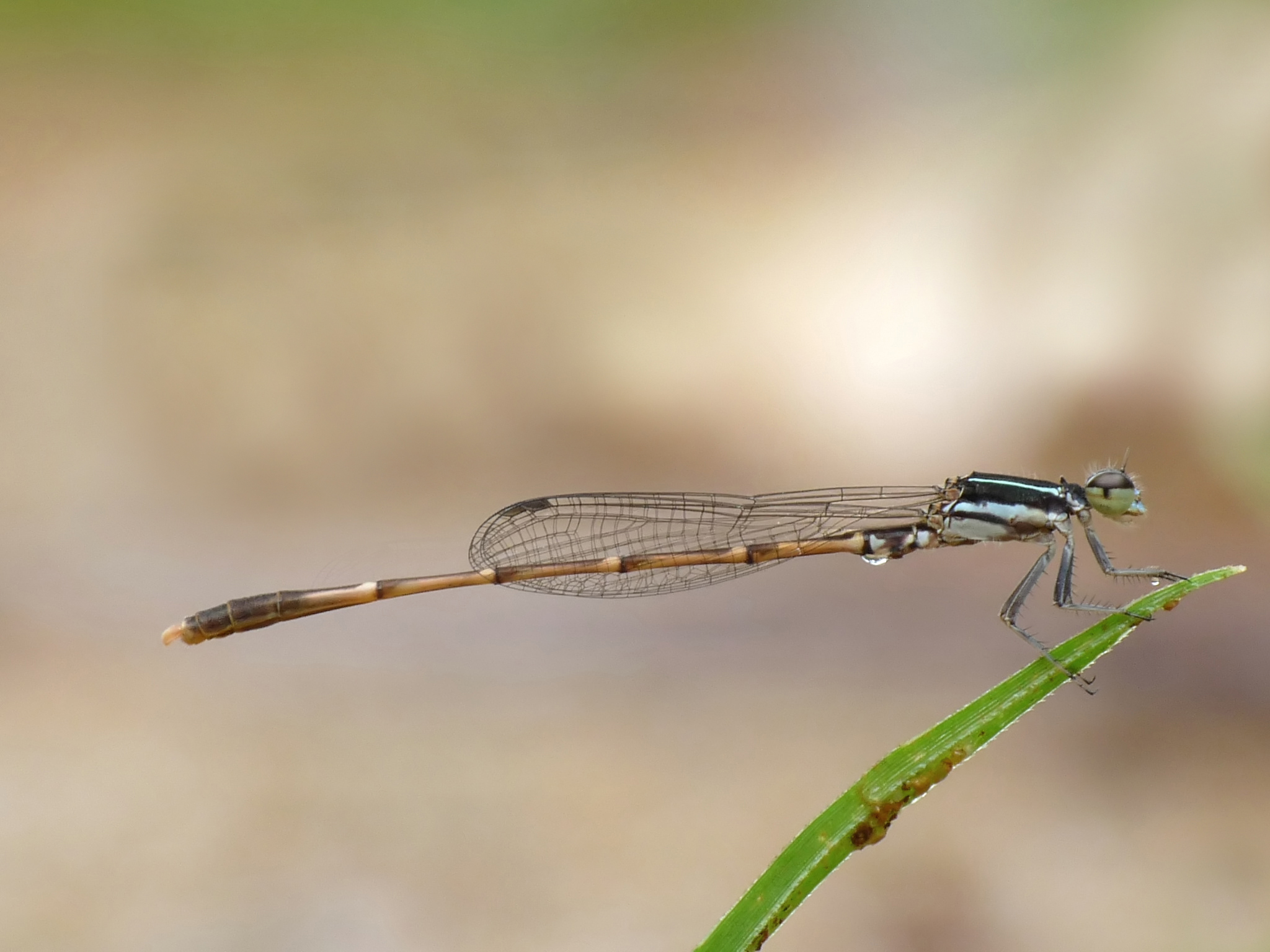
Agriocnemis splendidissima sub-adult male

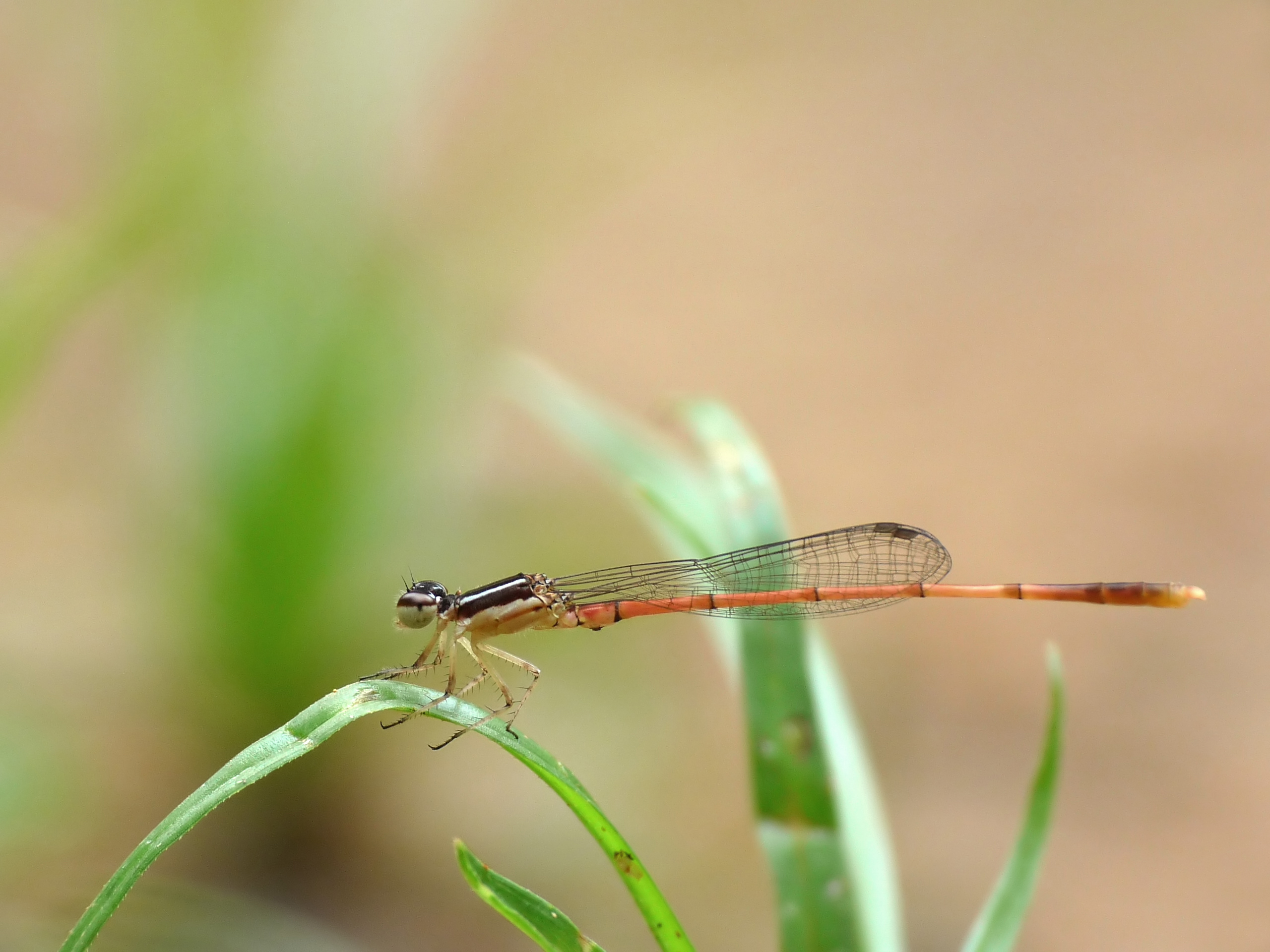
Agriocnemis splendidissima juvenile male

==== Genus: Amphiallagma ====
===== Species: Amphiallagma parvum =====
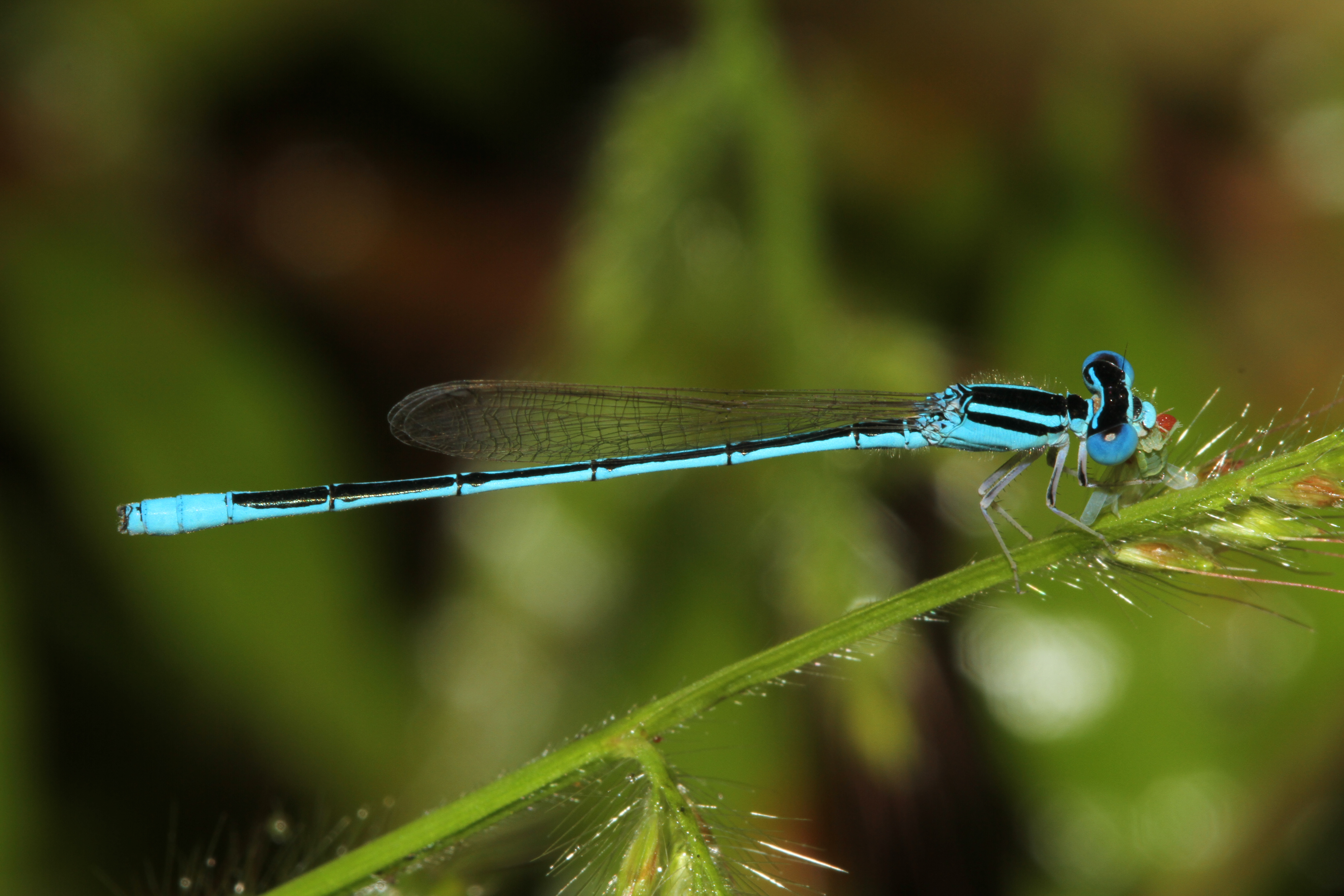
Amphiallagma parvum male

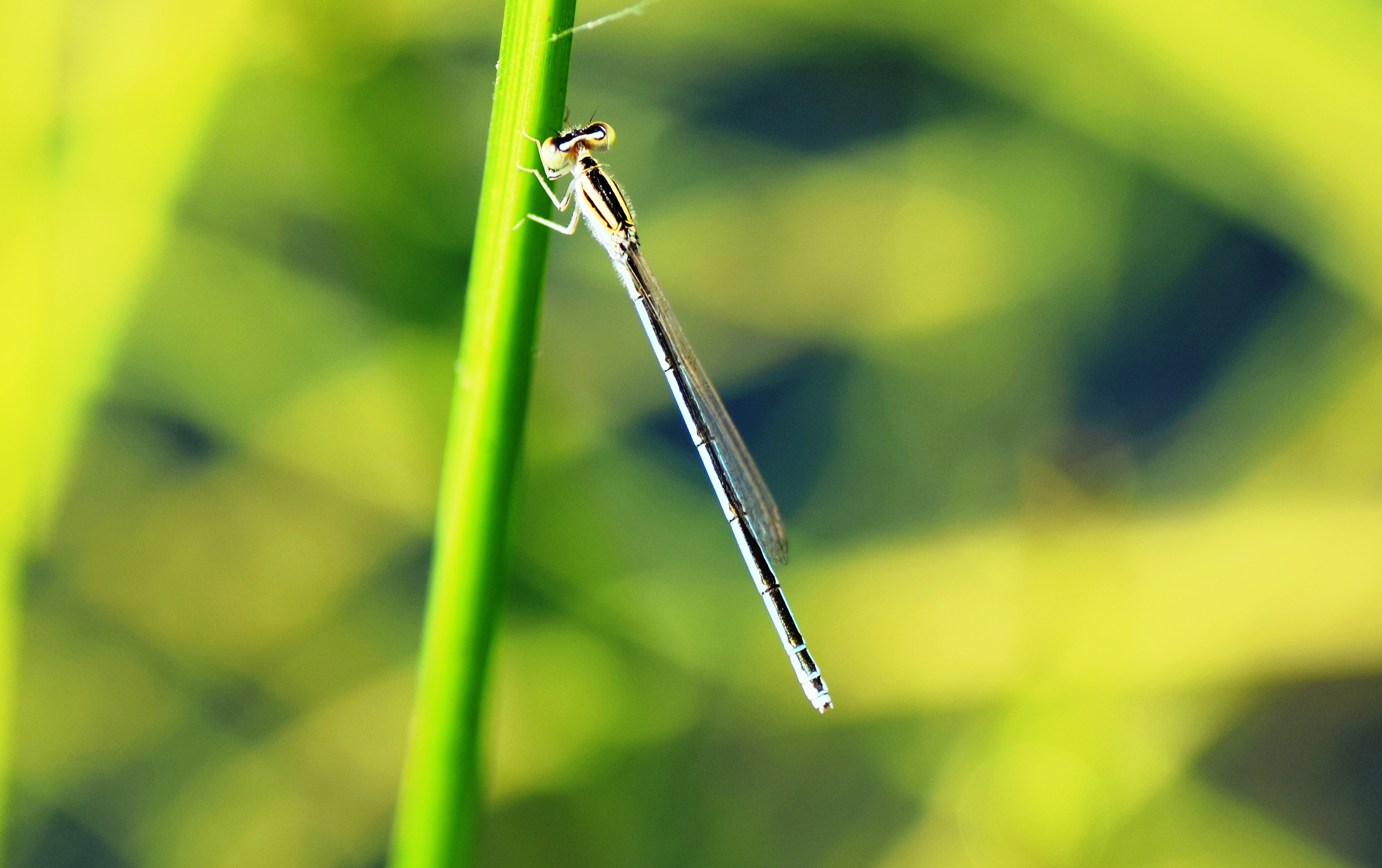
Amphiallagma parvum female

==== Genus: Archibasis ====
===== Species: Archibasis oscillans =====
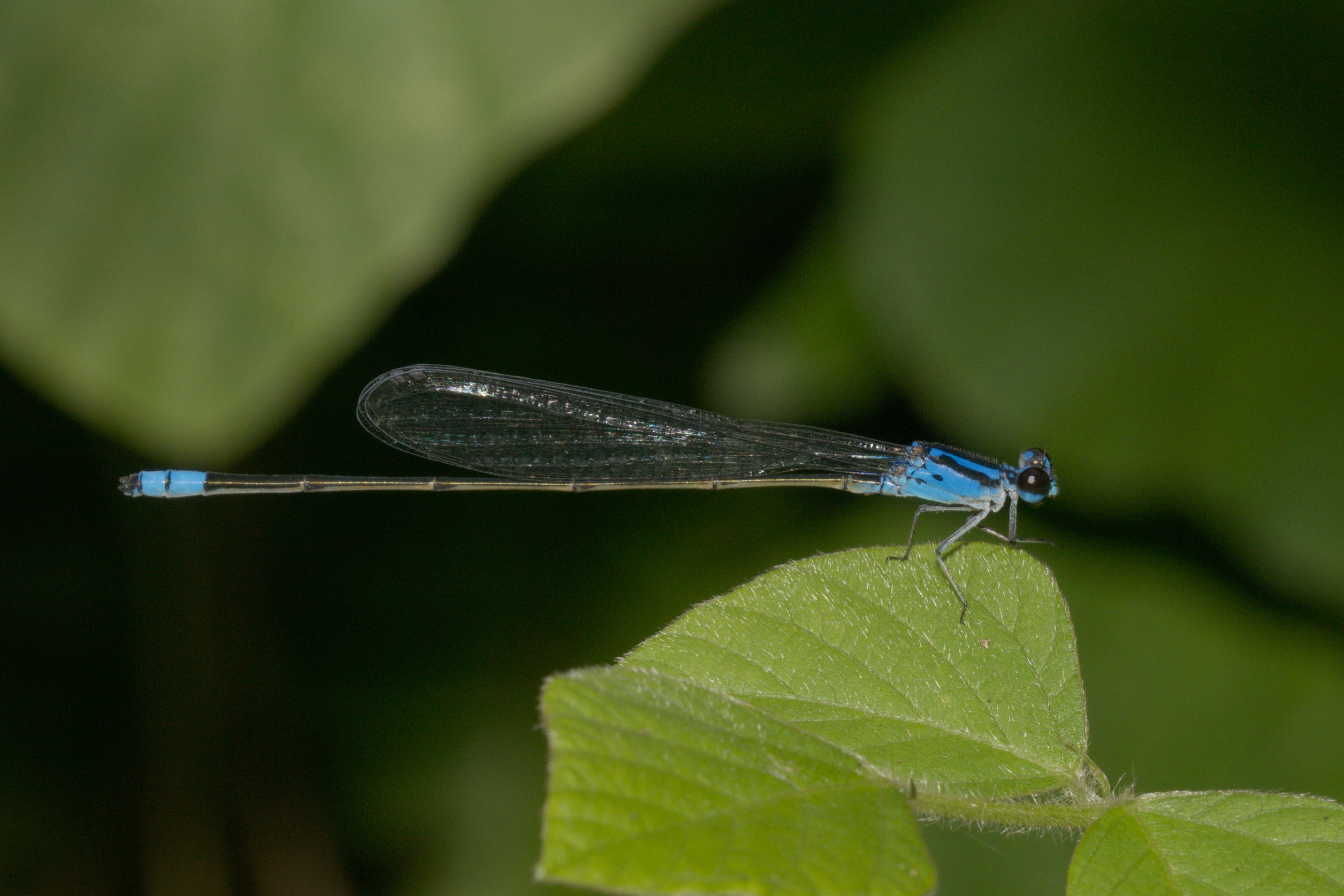
Archibasis oscillans male

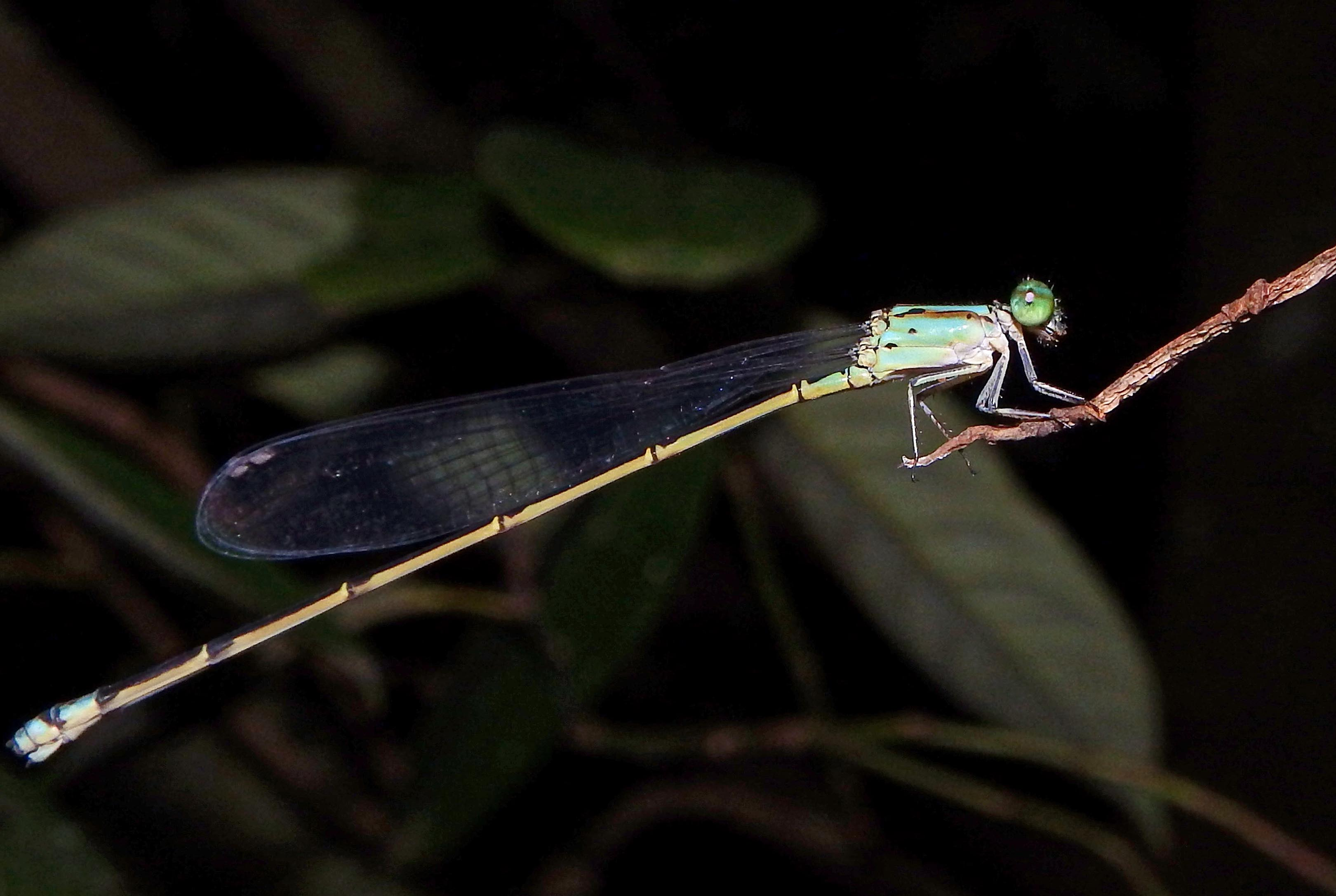
Female

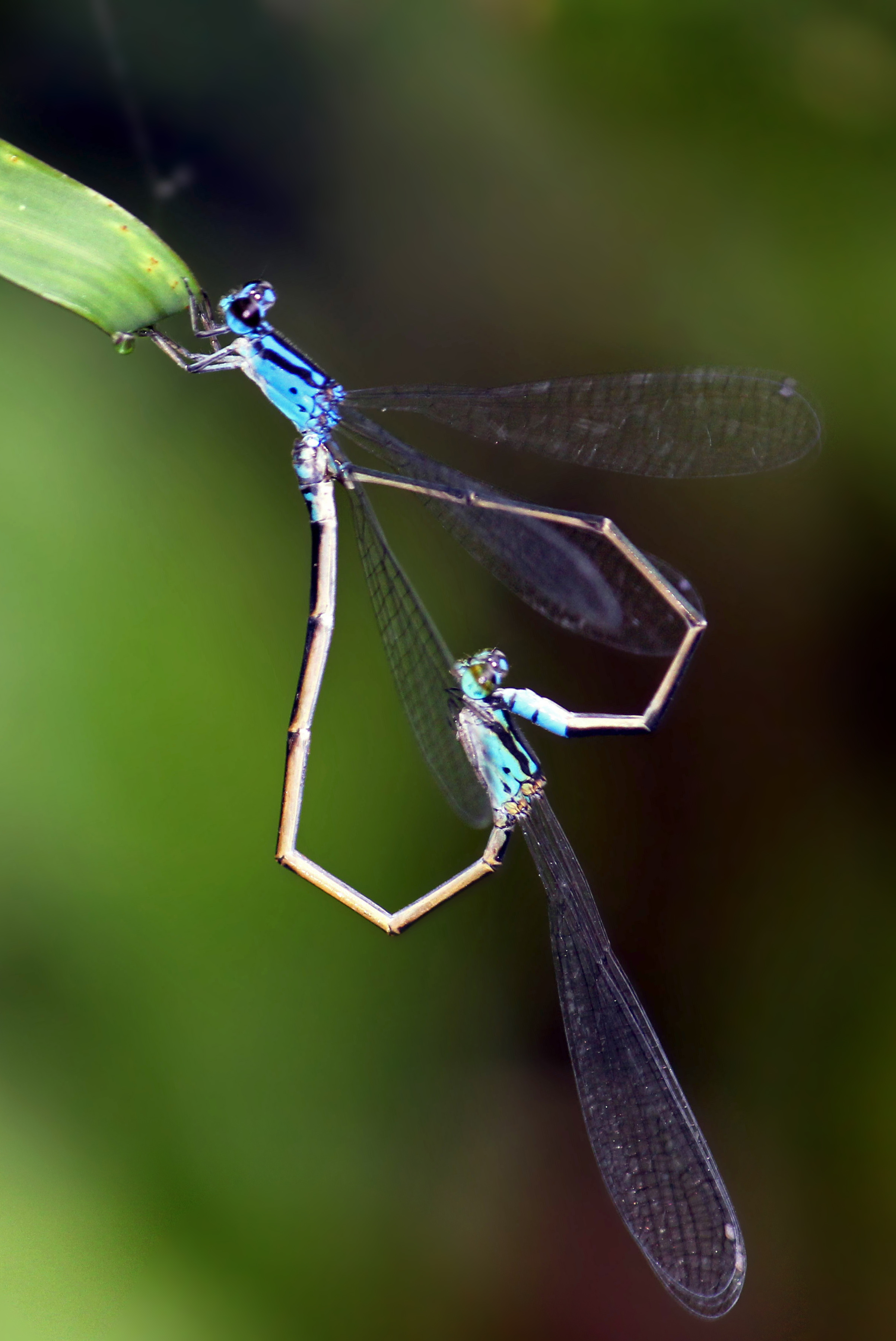
Archibasis oscillans mating pair

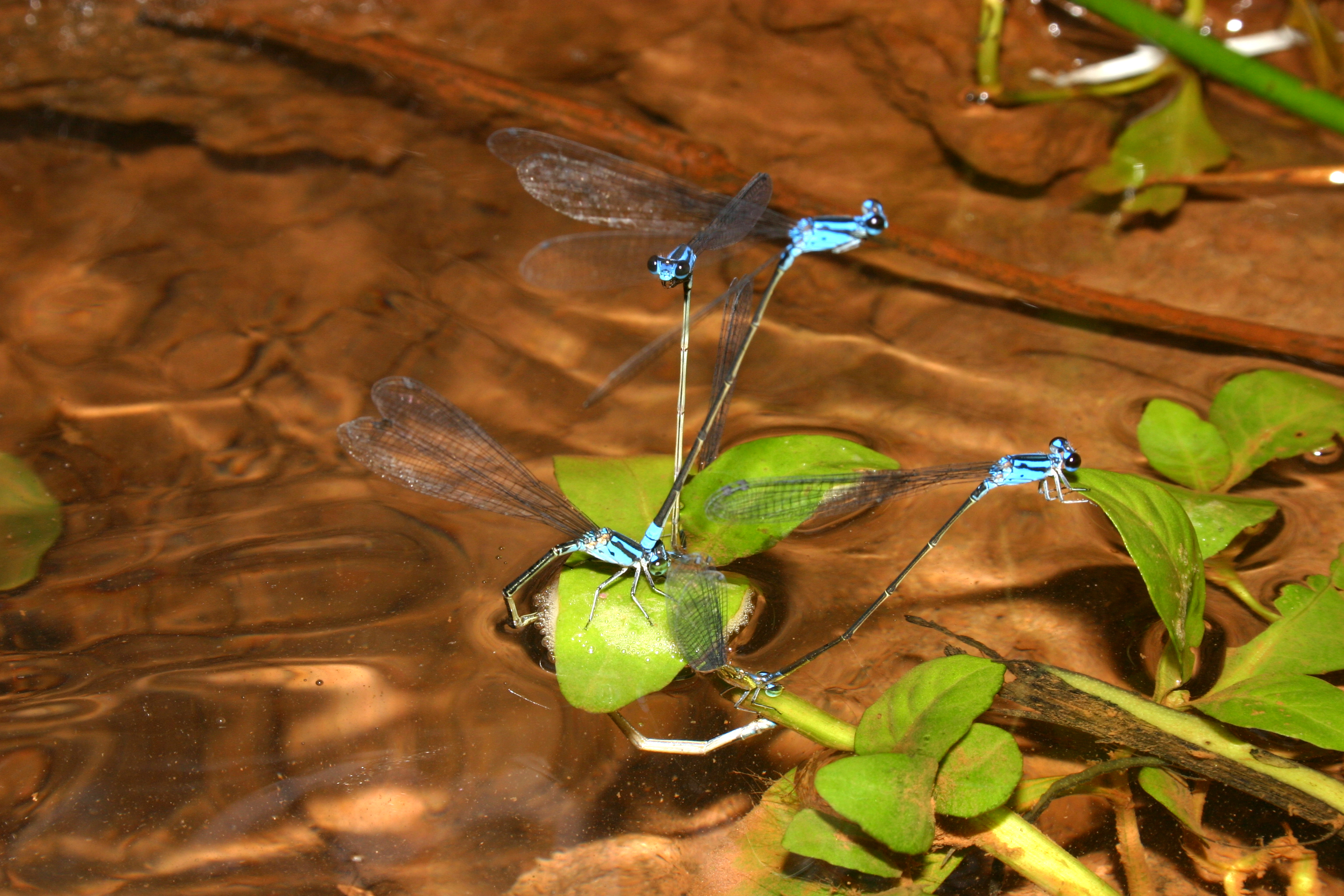
Archibasis oscillans egg-laying

==== Genus: Ceriagrion ====
===== Species: Ceriagrion cerinorubellum =====
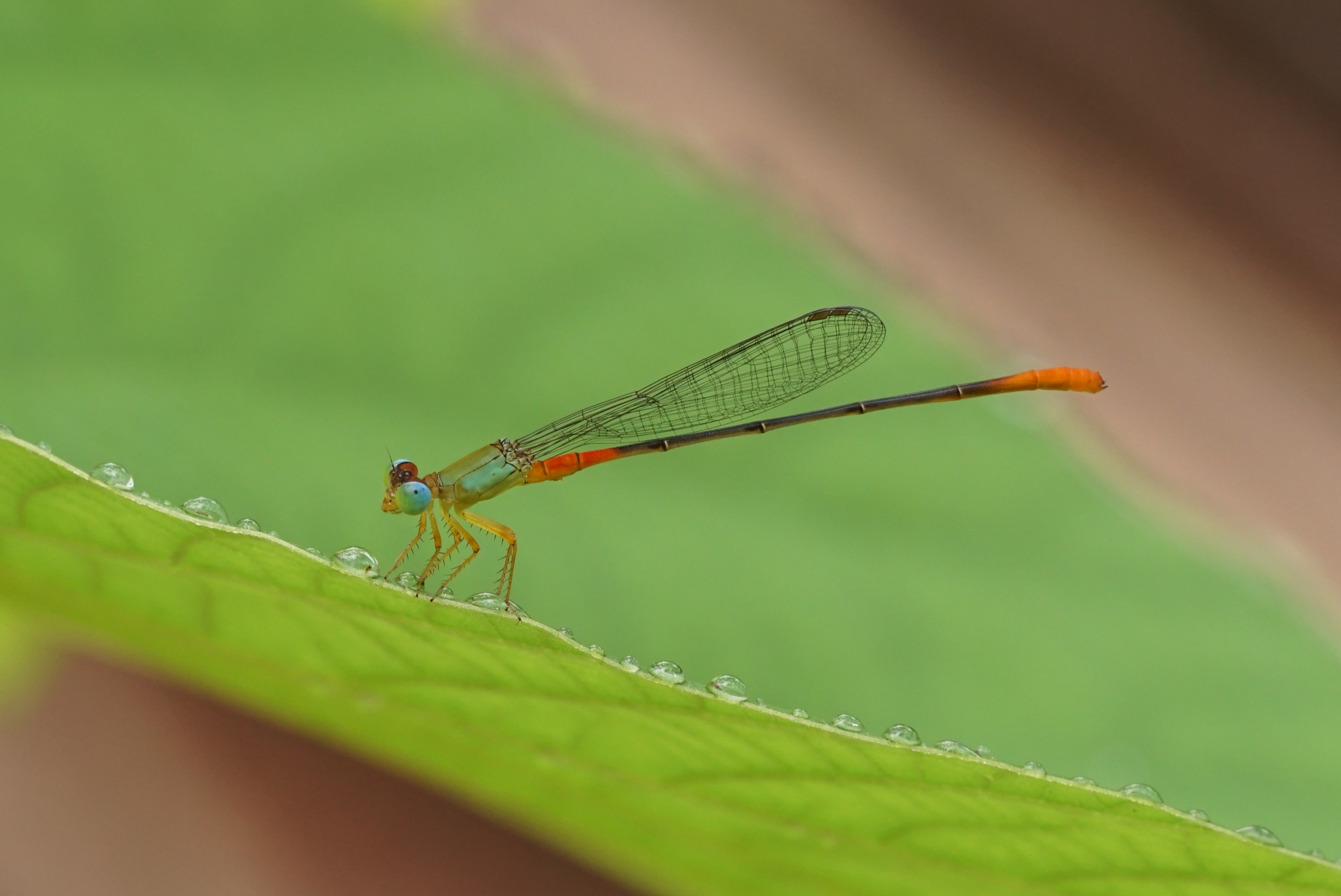
Ceriagrion cerinorubellum male

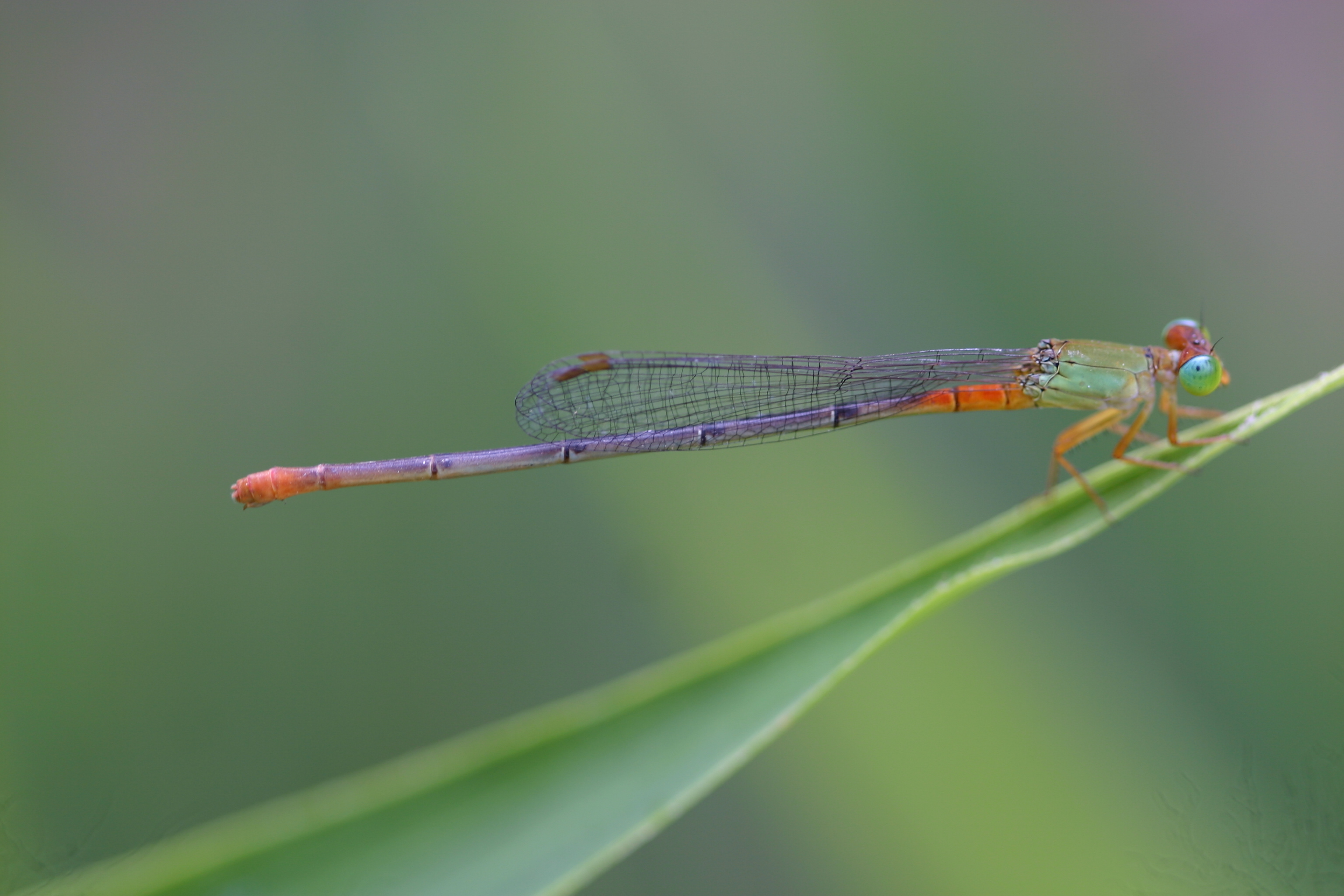
Ceriagrion cerinorubellum female

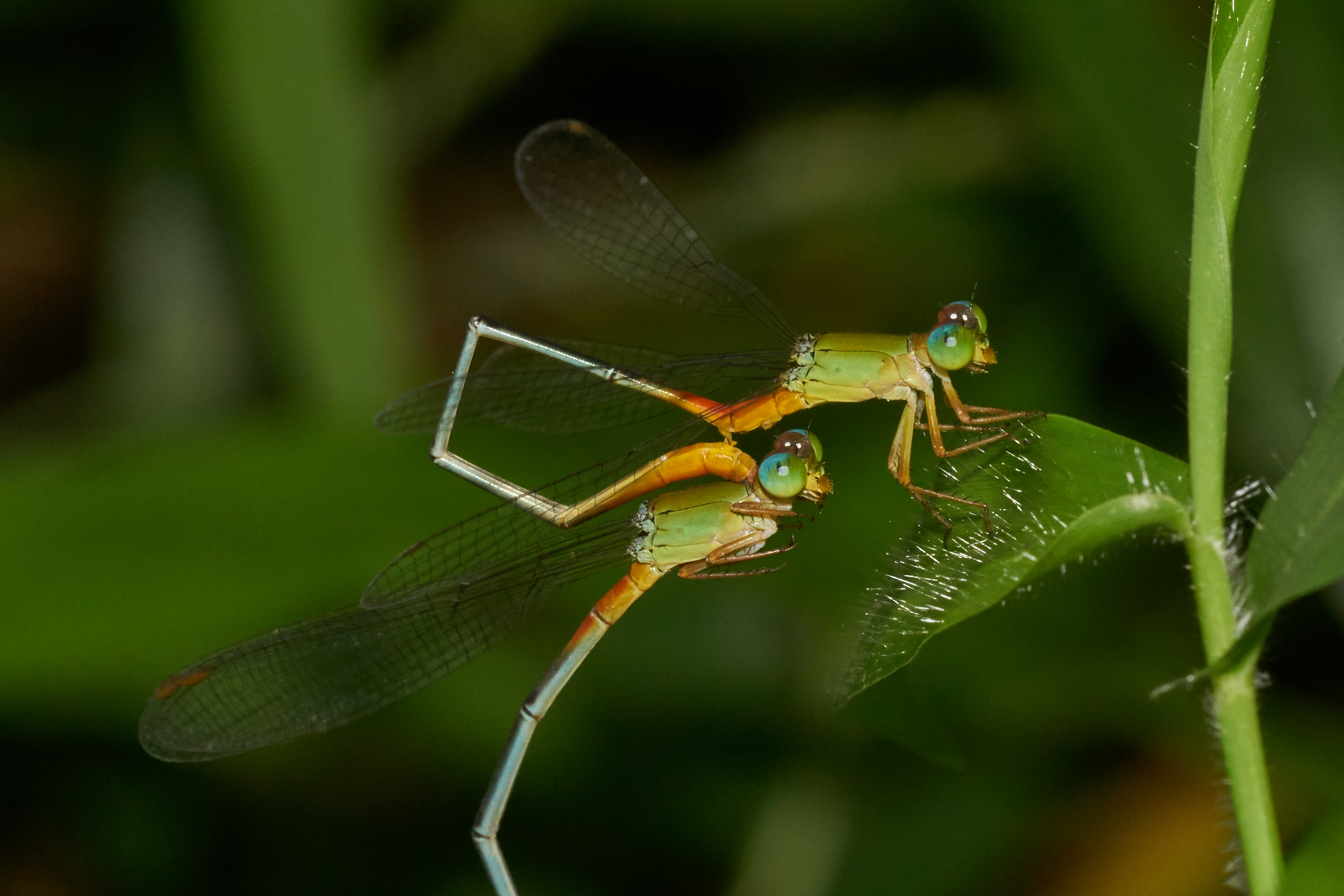
Intra-male sperm translocation

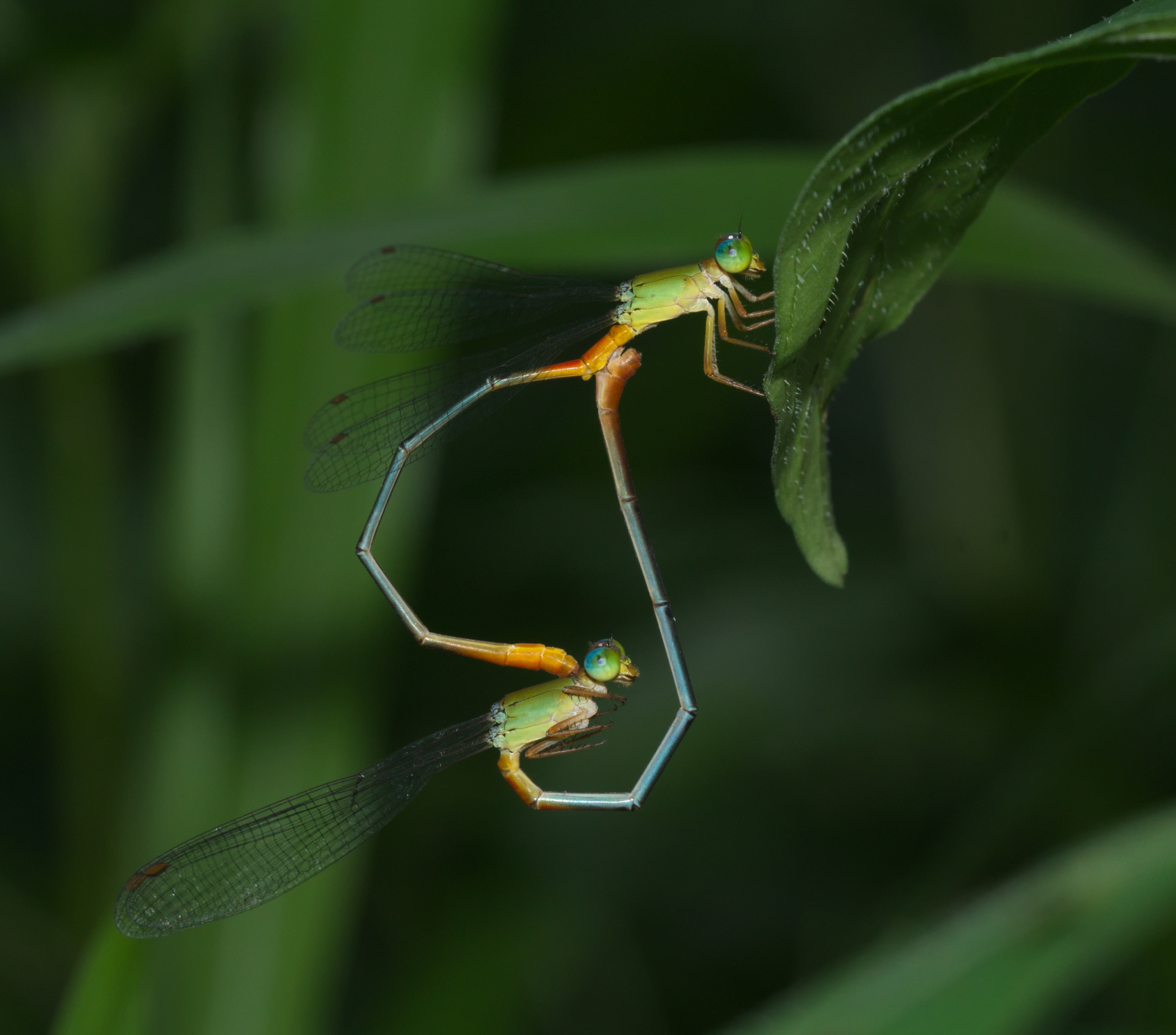
Ceriagrion cerinorubellum mating

===== Species: Ceriagrion chromothorax =====
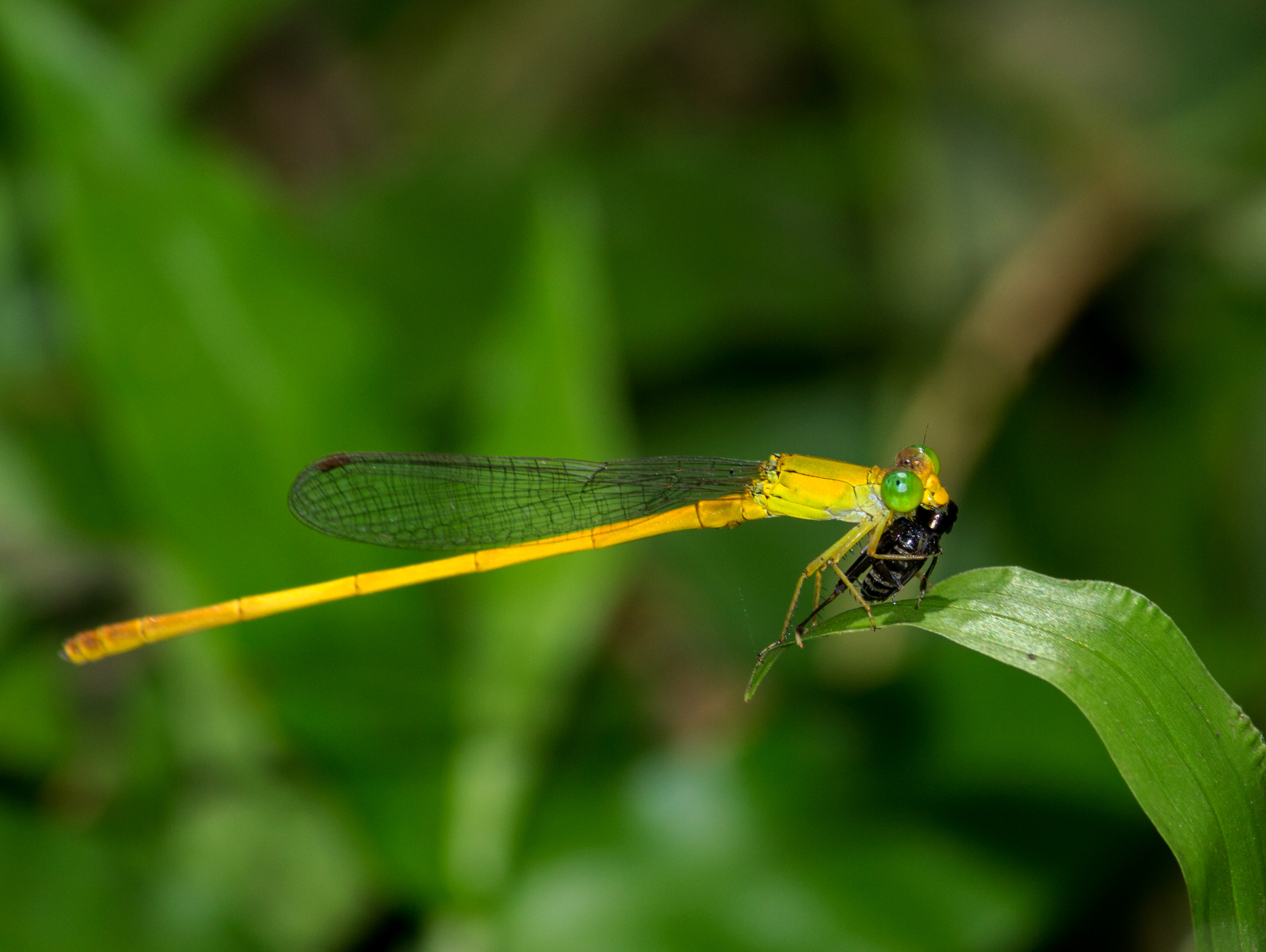
male

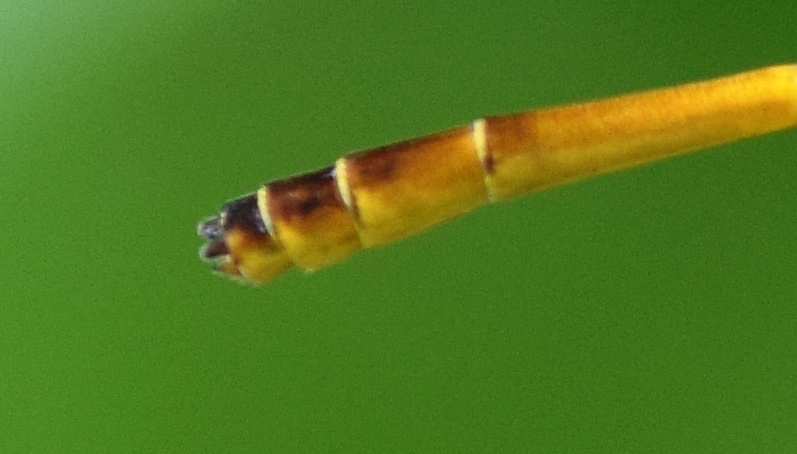
Anal appendages

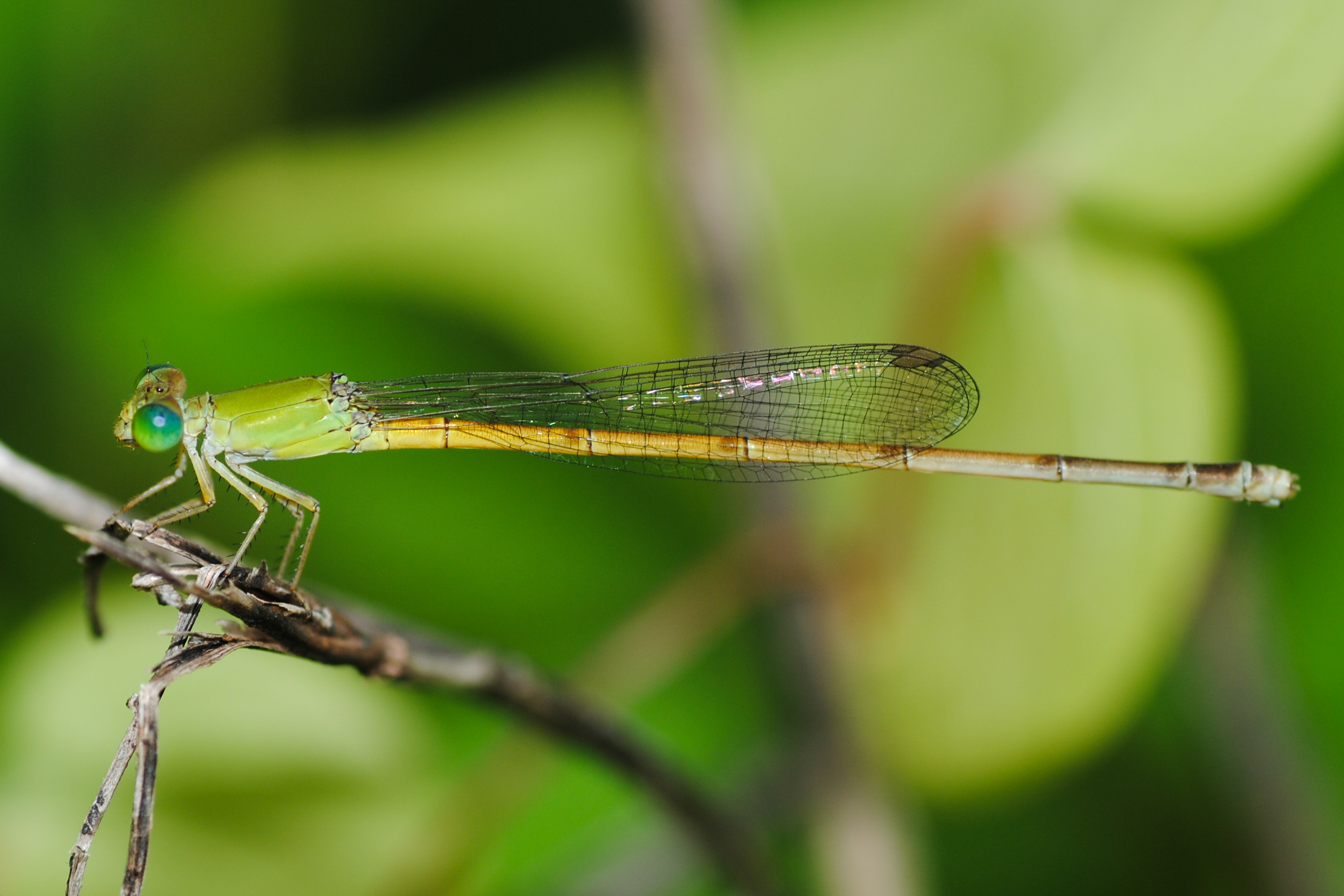
female

===== Species: Ceriagrion coromandelianum =====
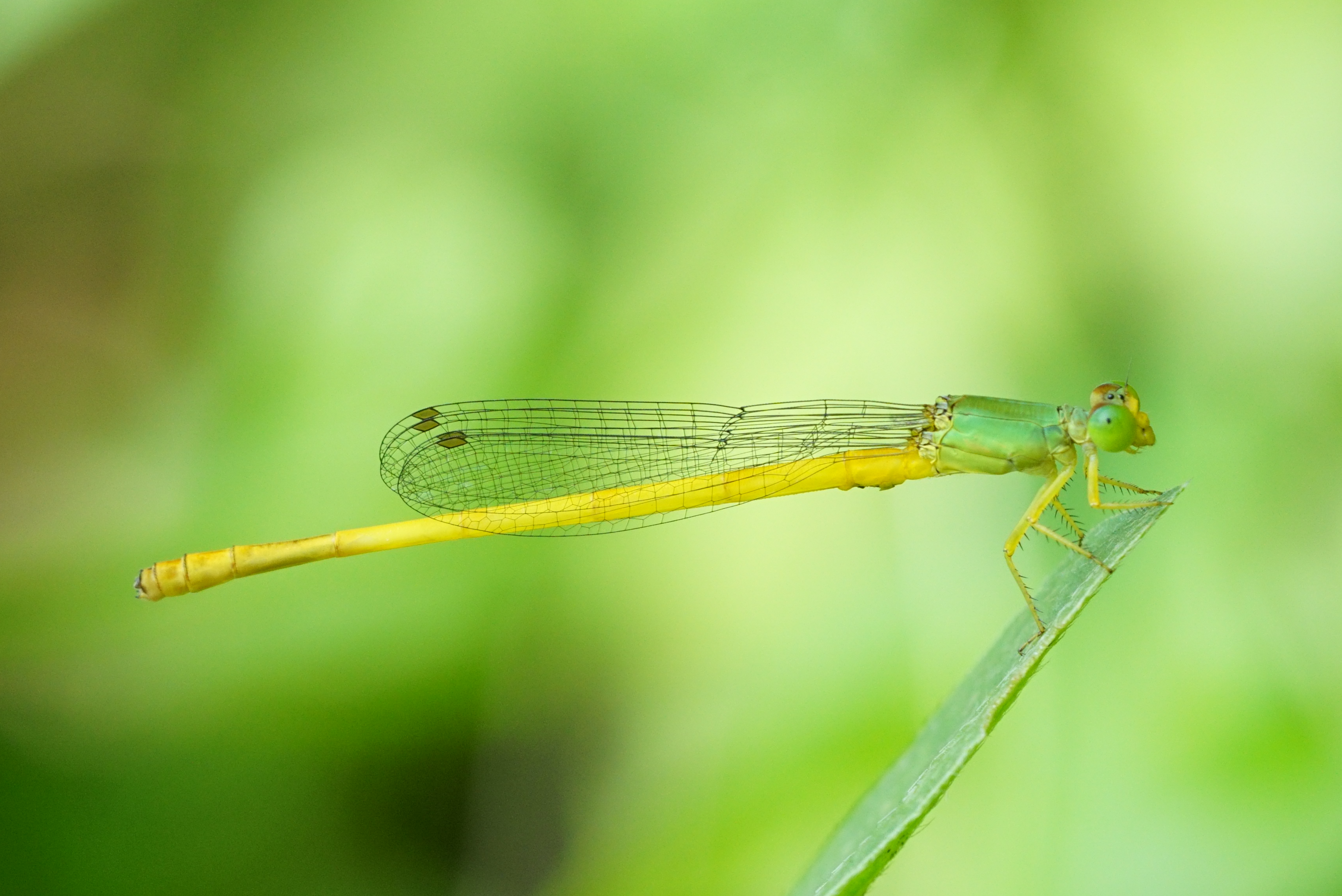
Ceriagrion coromandelianum male

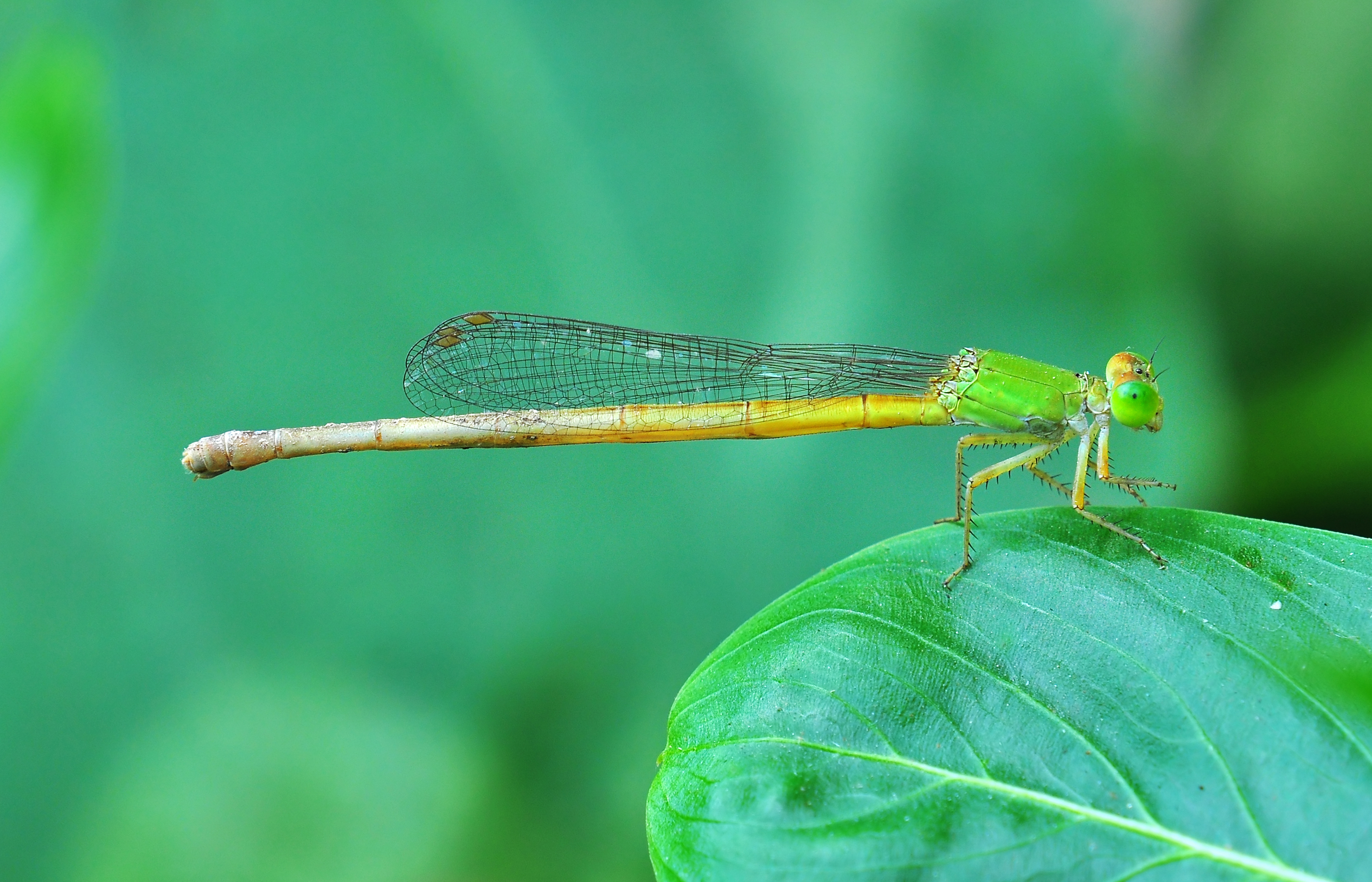
Ceriagrion coromandelianum female

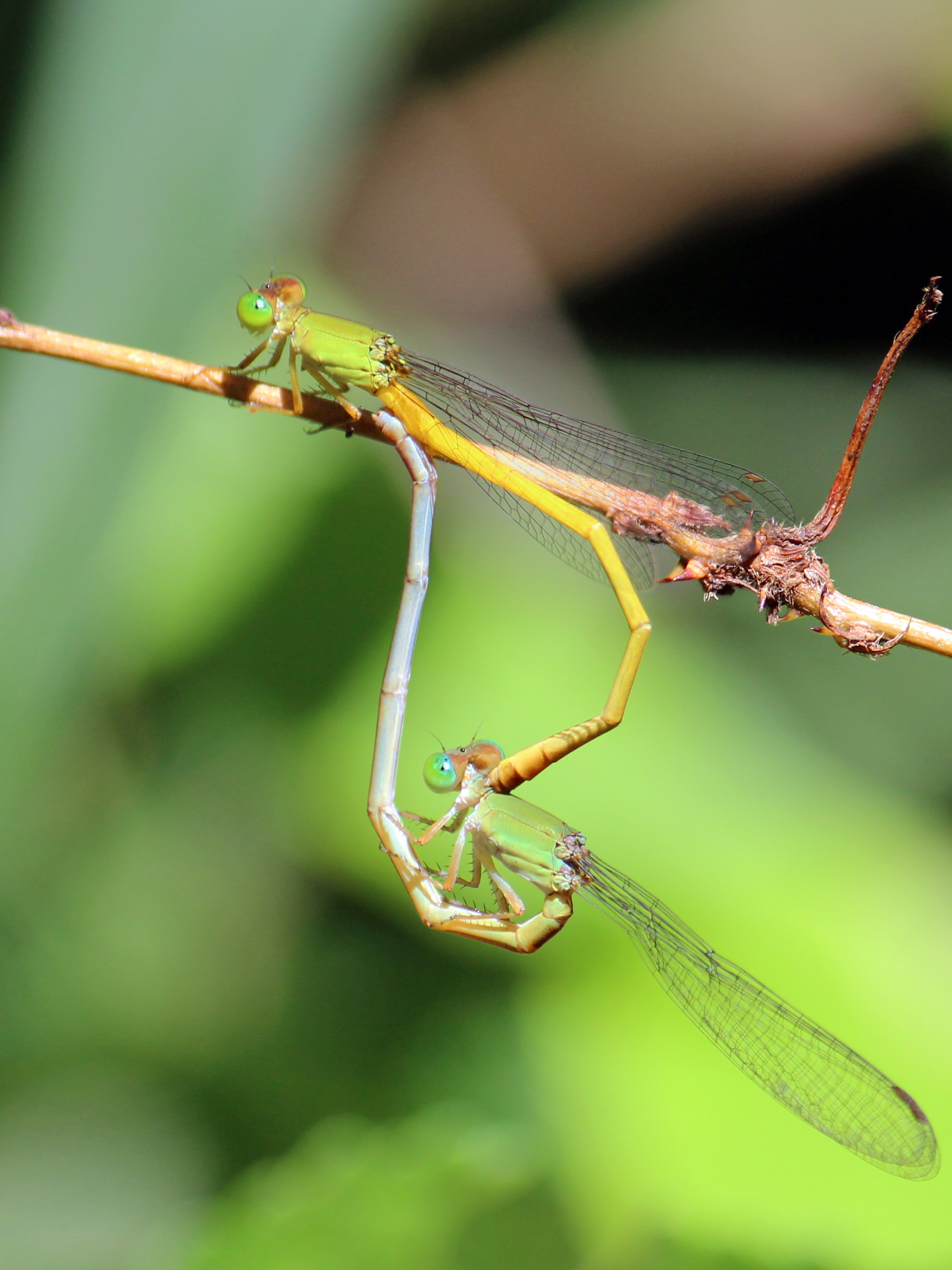
mating pair

===== Species: Ceriagrion olivaceum =====
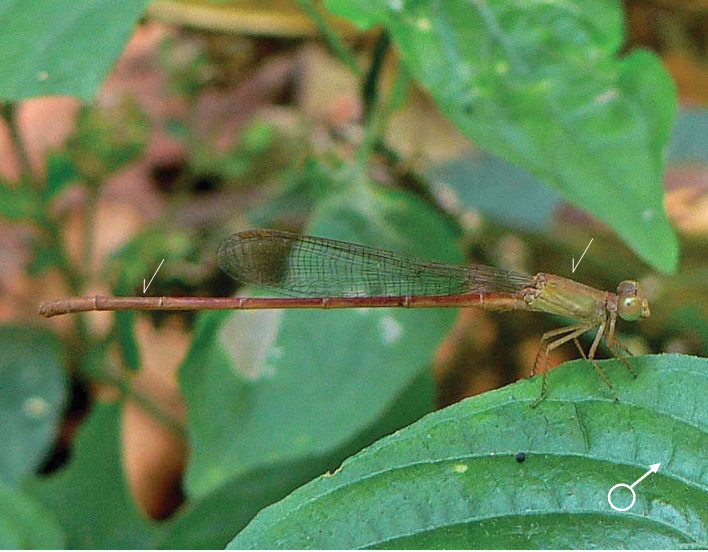
Ceriagrion olivaceum male

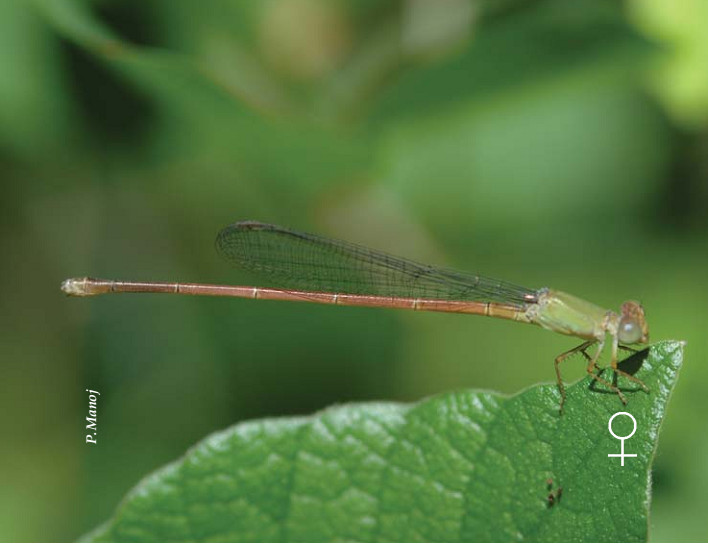
Ceriagrion olivaceum female

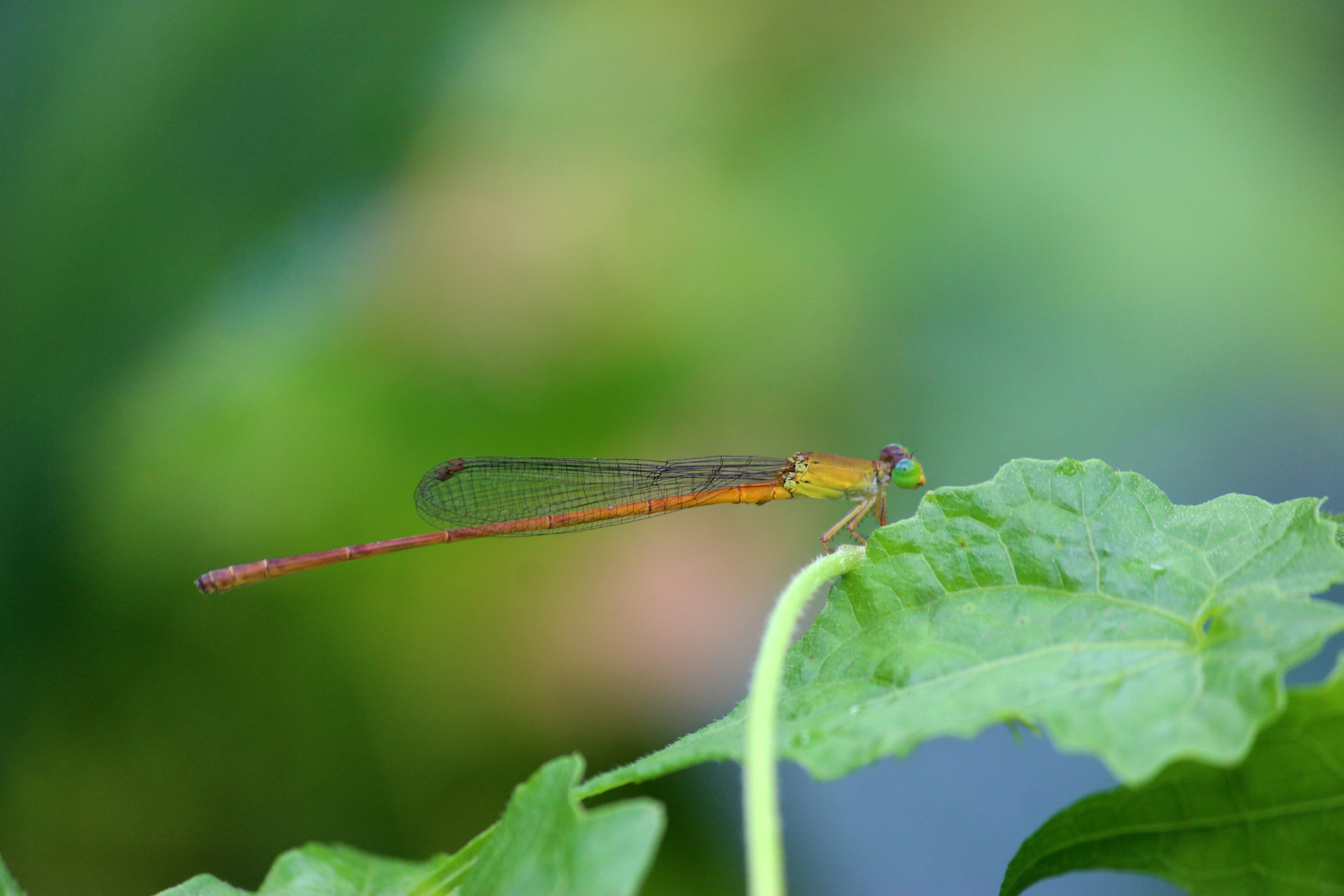
Ceriagrion olivaceum auraniacum male

===== Species: Ceriagrion rubiae =====
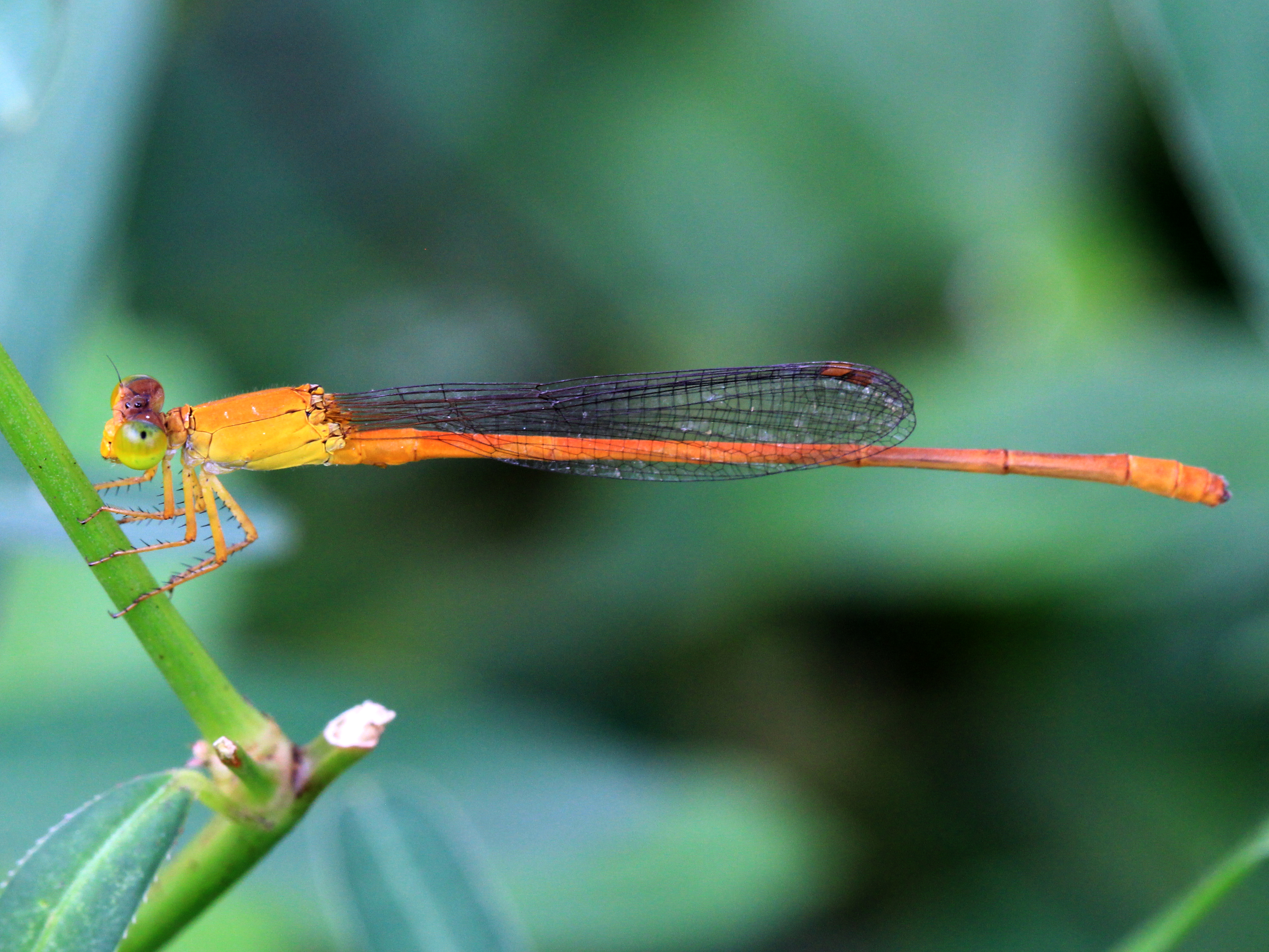
male

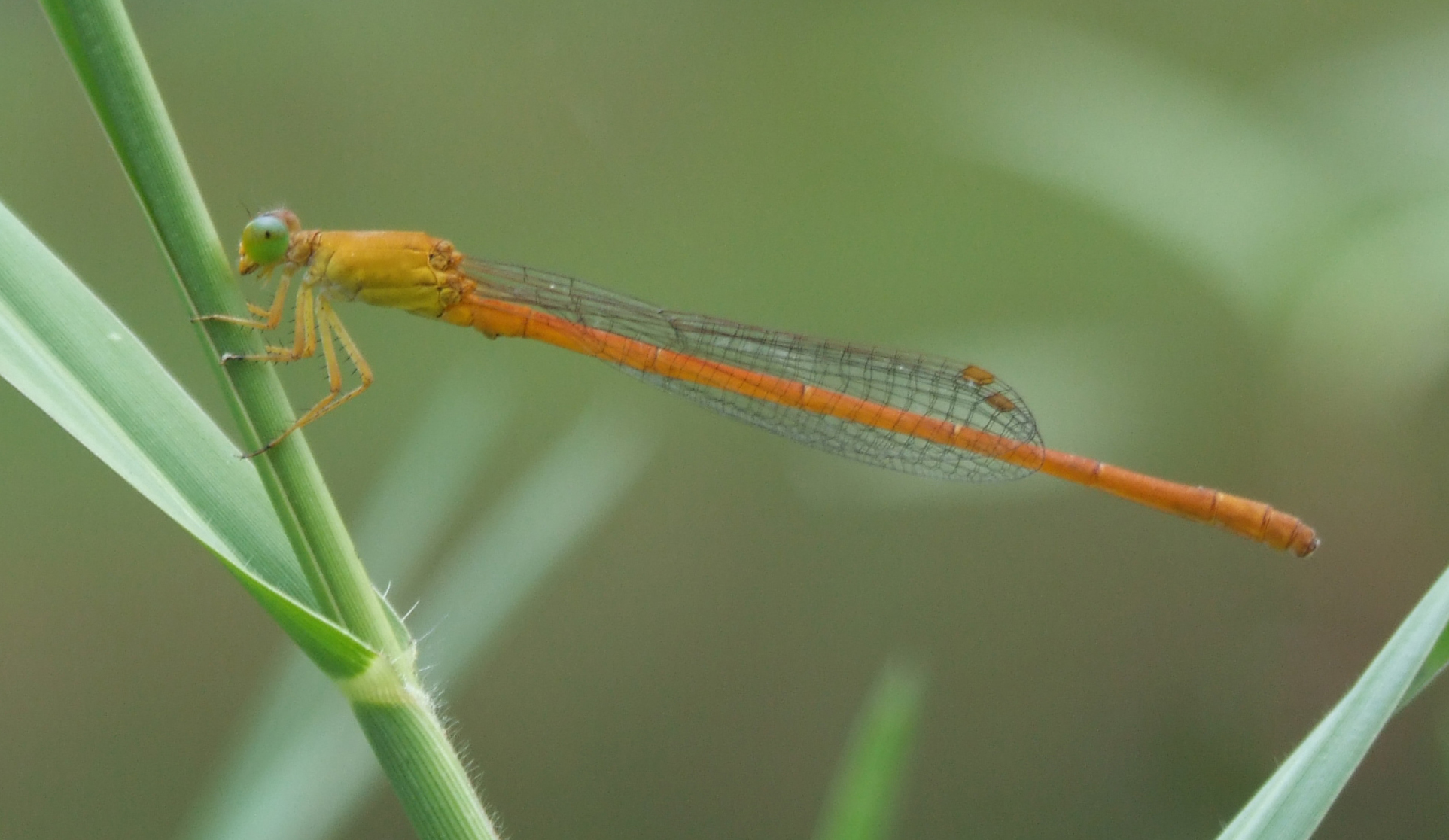
Ceriagrion rubiae male

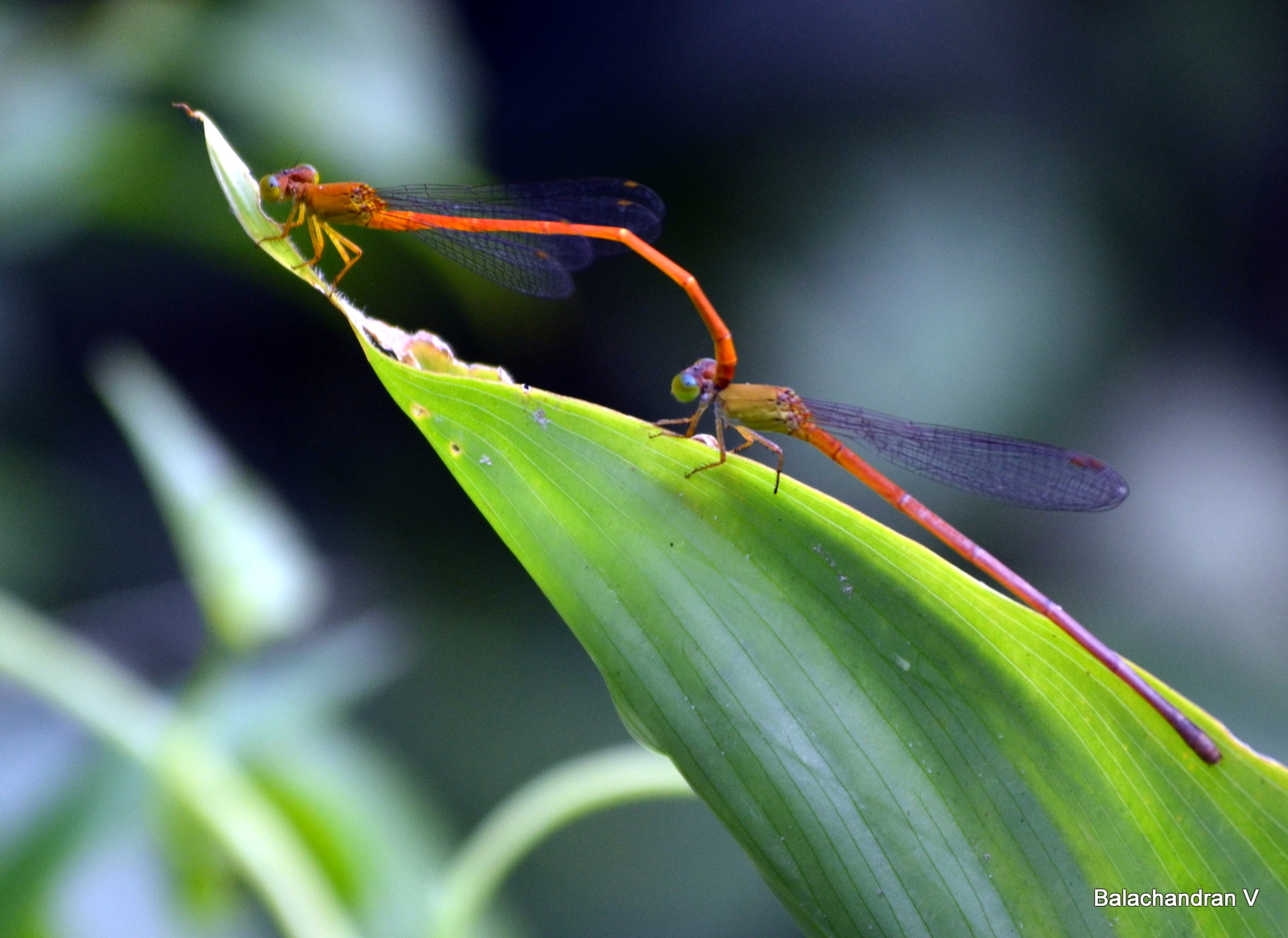
Ceriagrion rubiae (tandem pair)

==== Genus: Ischnura ====
===== Species: Ischnura rubilio =====
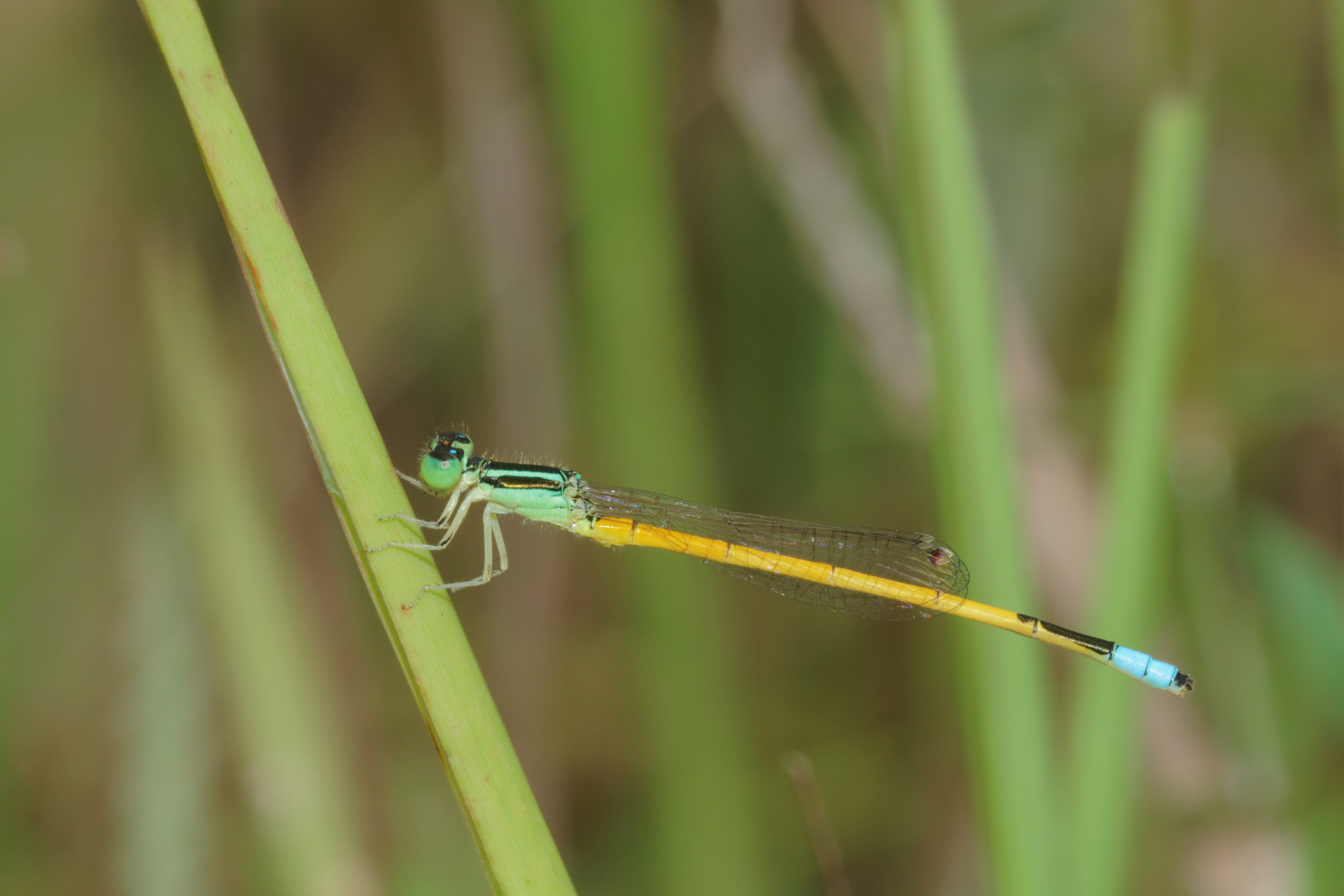
Ischnura rubilio male

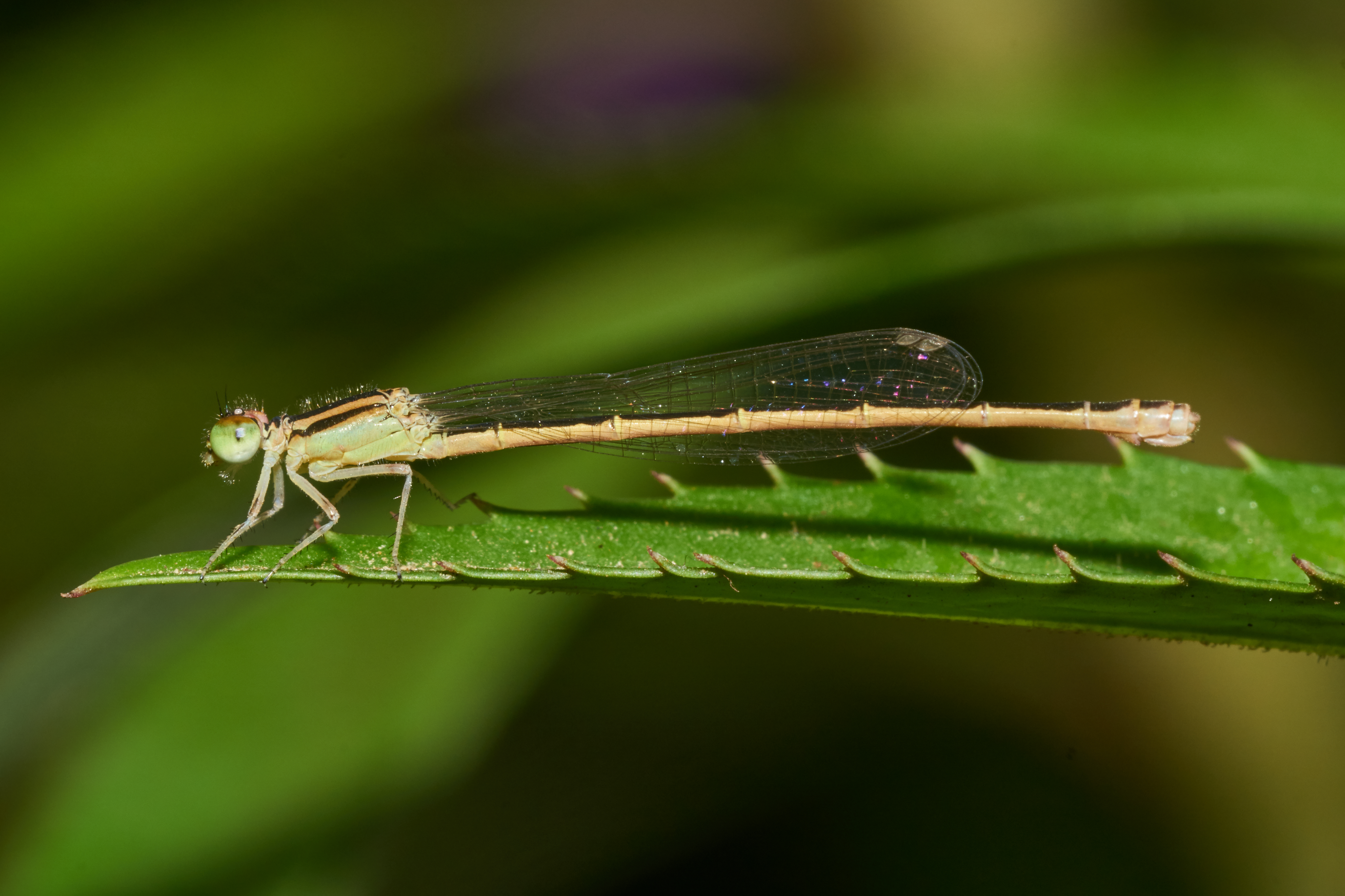
Ischnura rubilio female

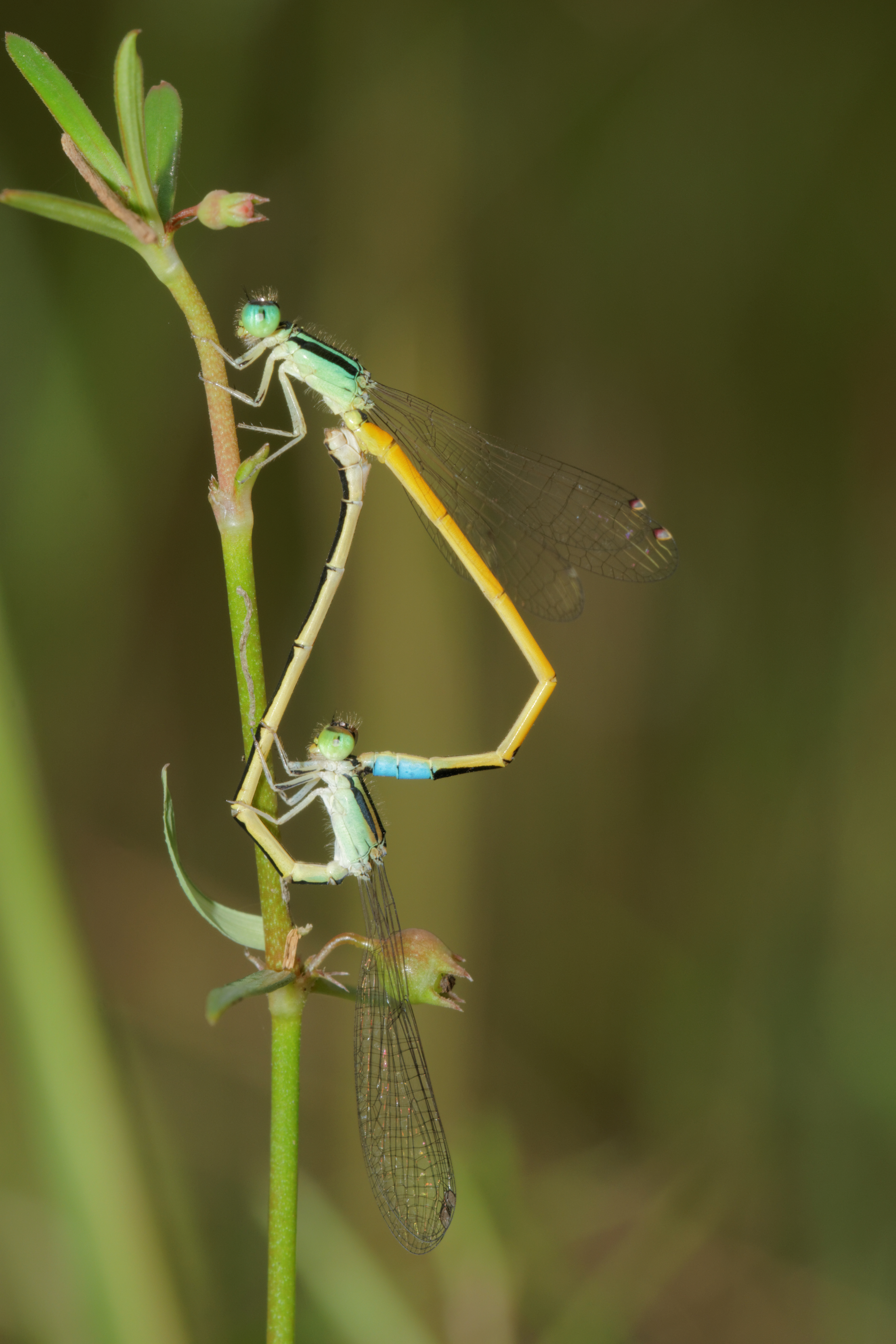
Ischnura rubilio mating pair

===== Species: Ischnura senegalensis =====
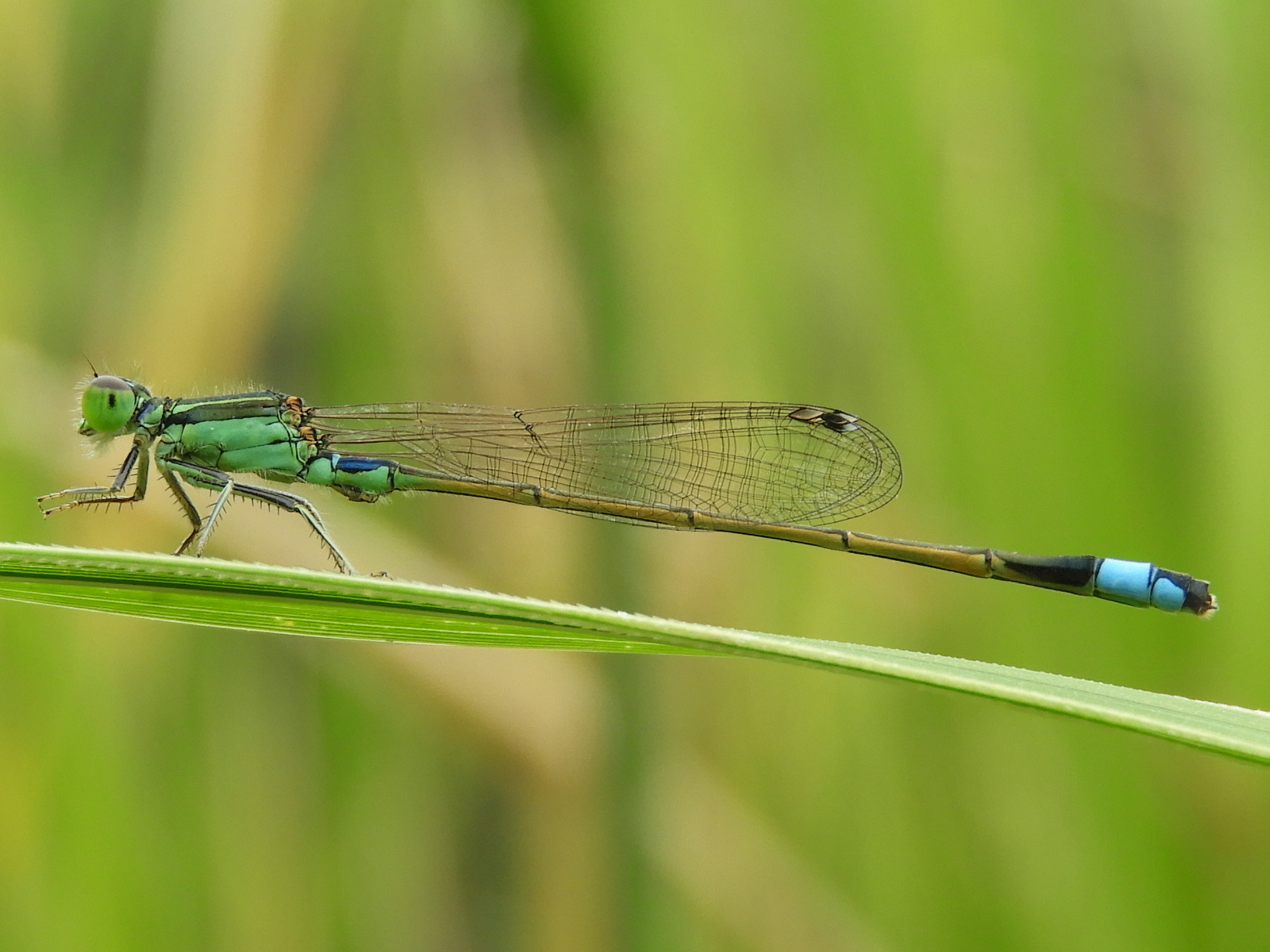
male

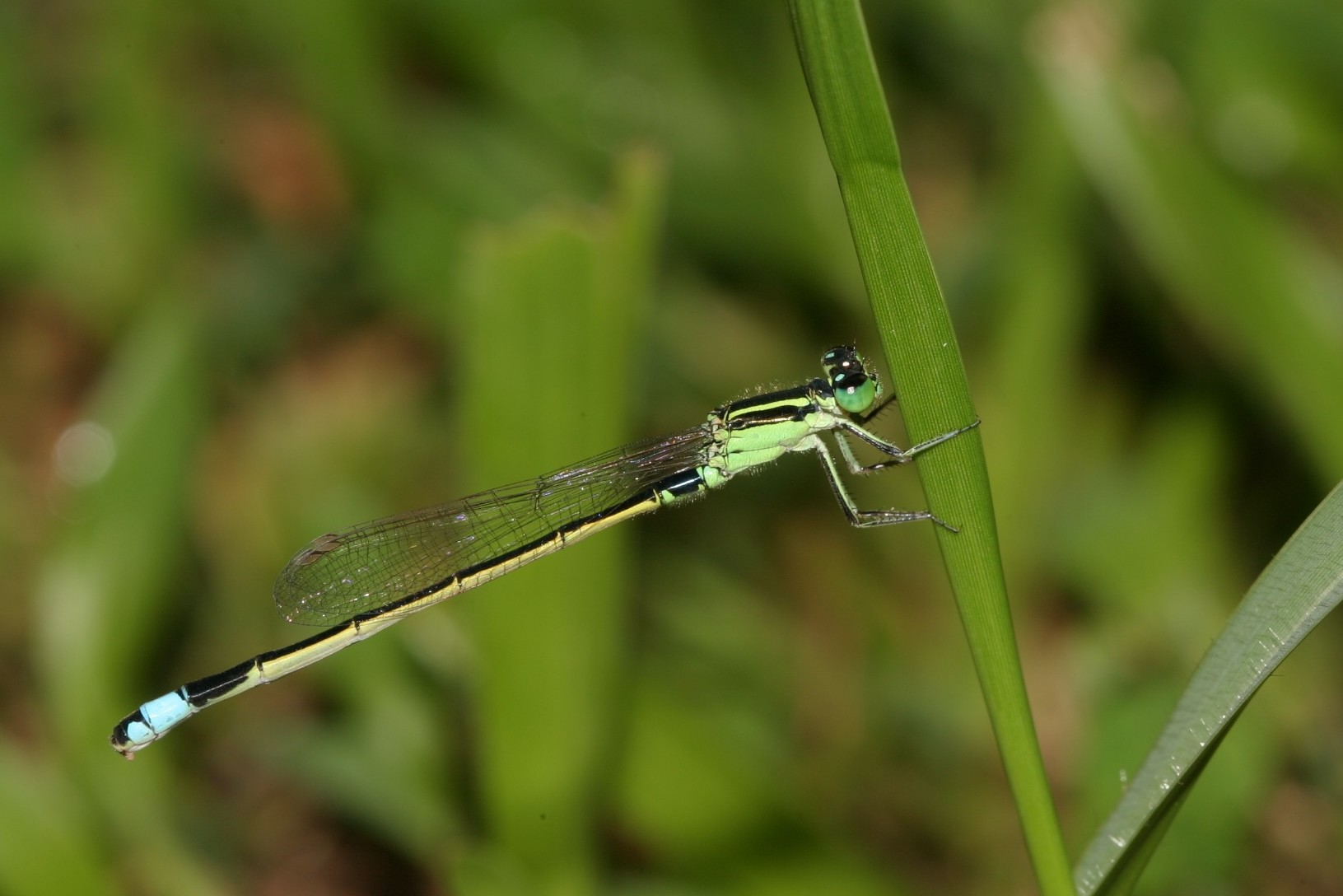
female (androchrome)

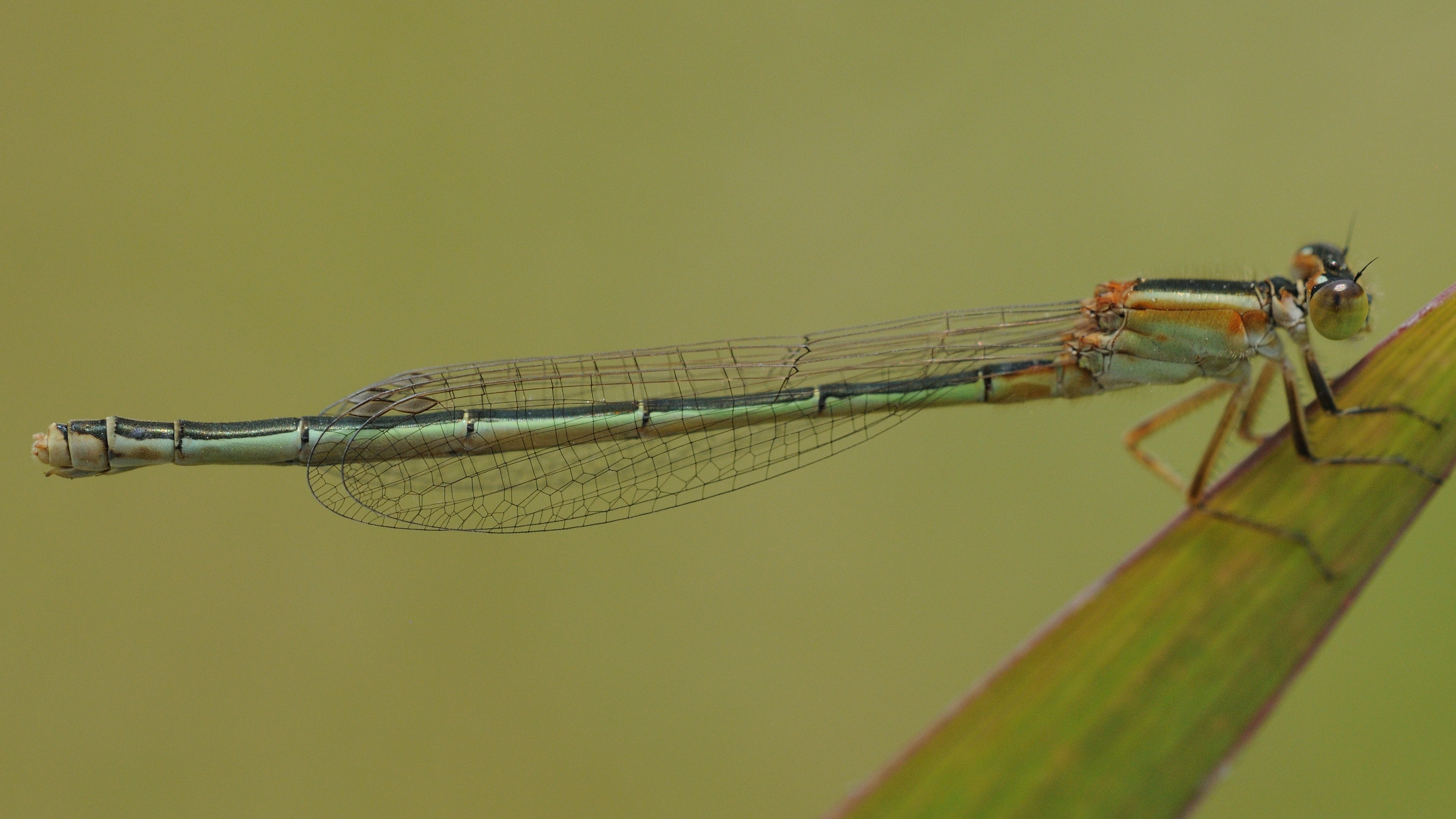
Female (gynochrome)

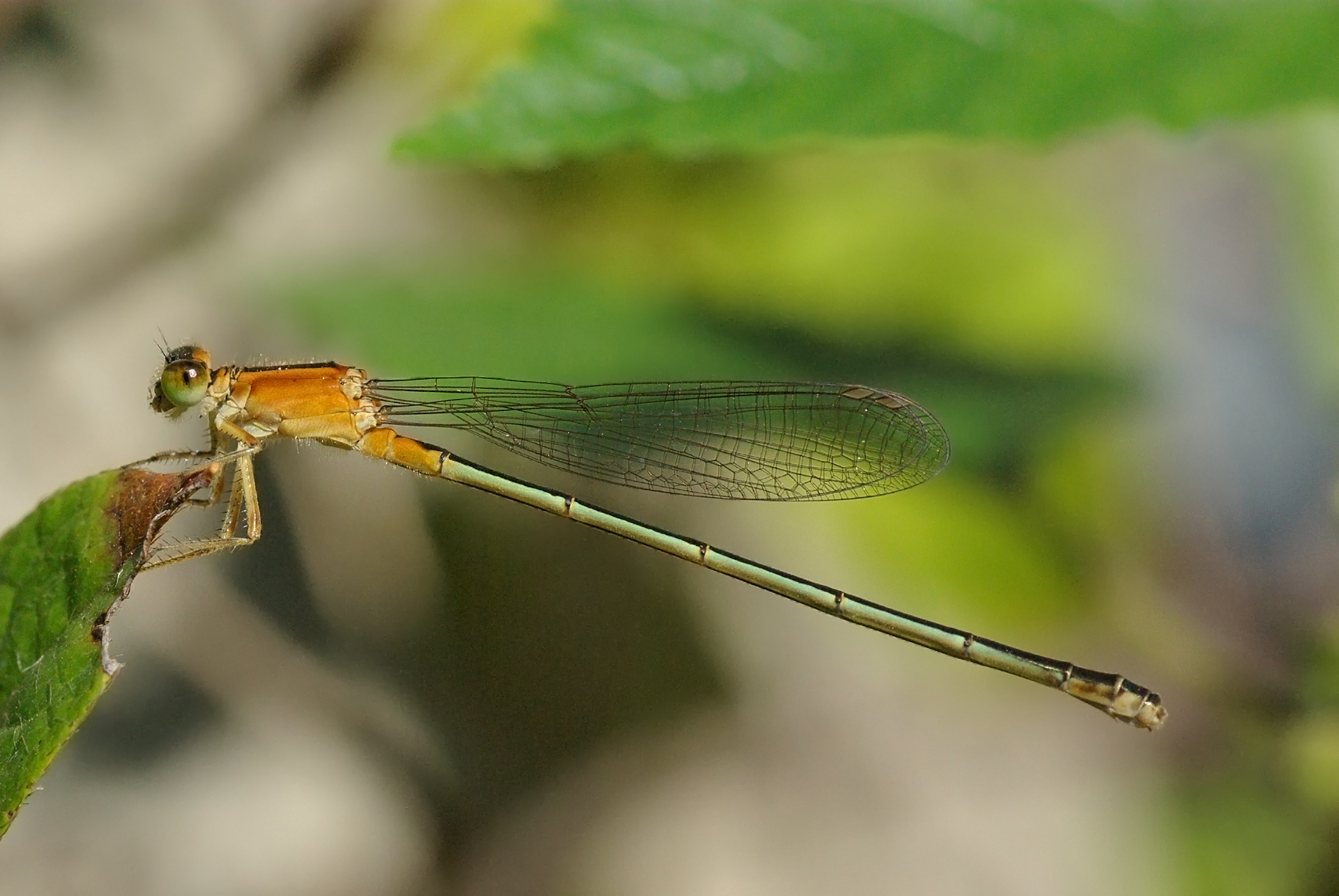
Female (gynochrome, sub-adult)

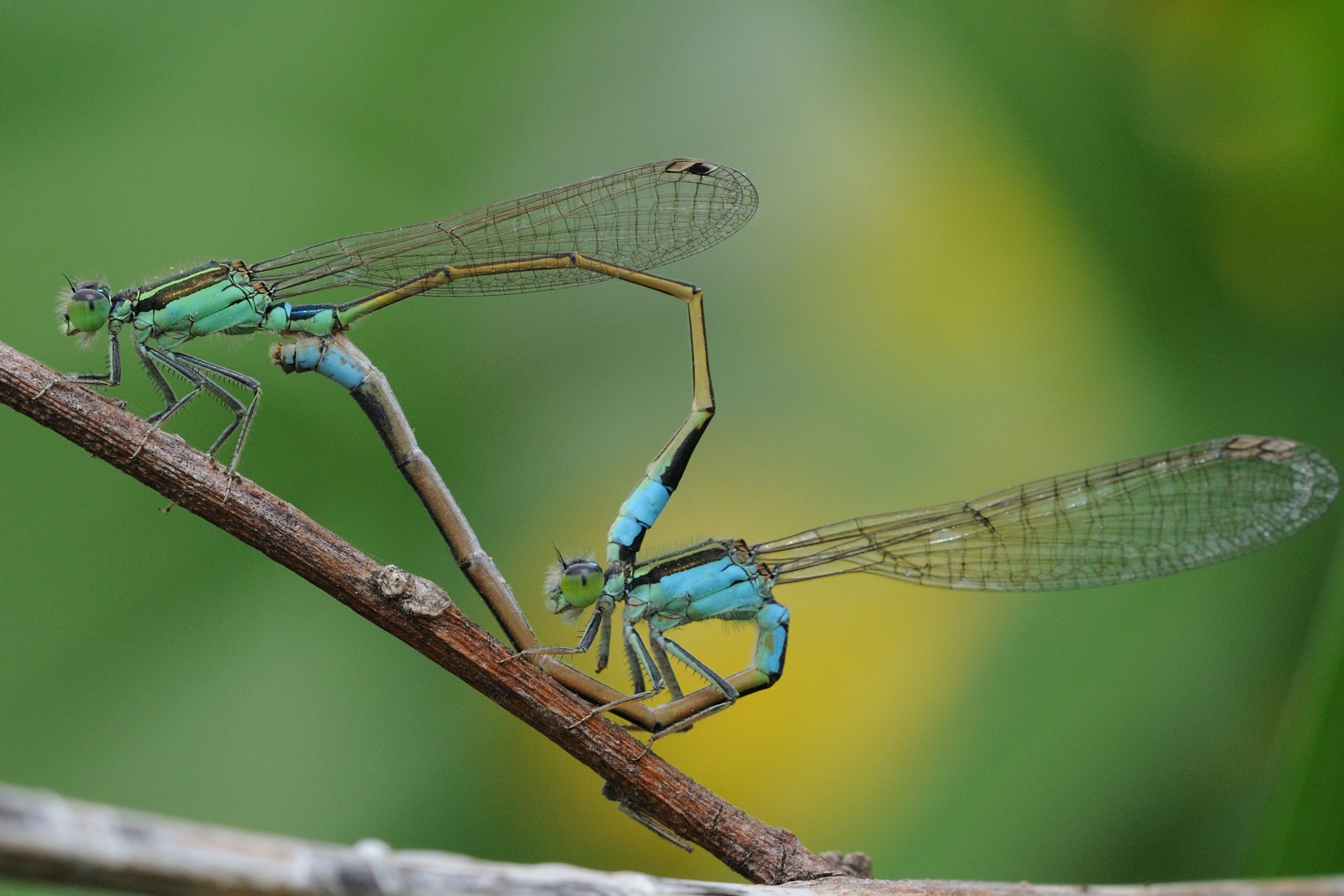
Mating pair

==== Genus: Mortonagrion ====
===== Species: Mortonagrion varralli =====
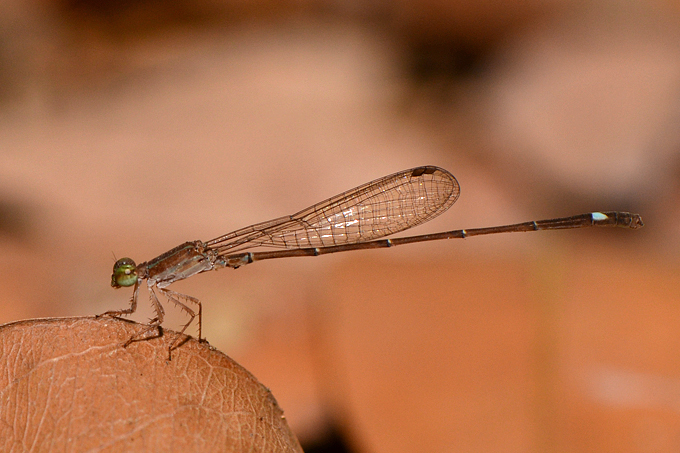
Mortonagrion varralli male

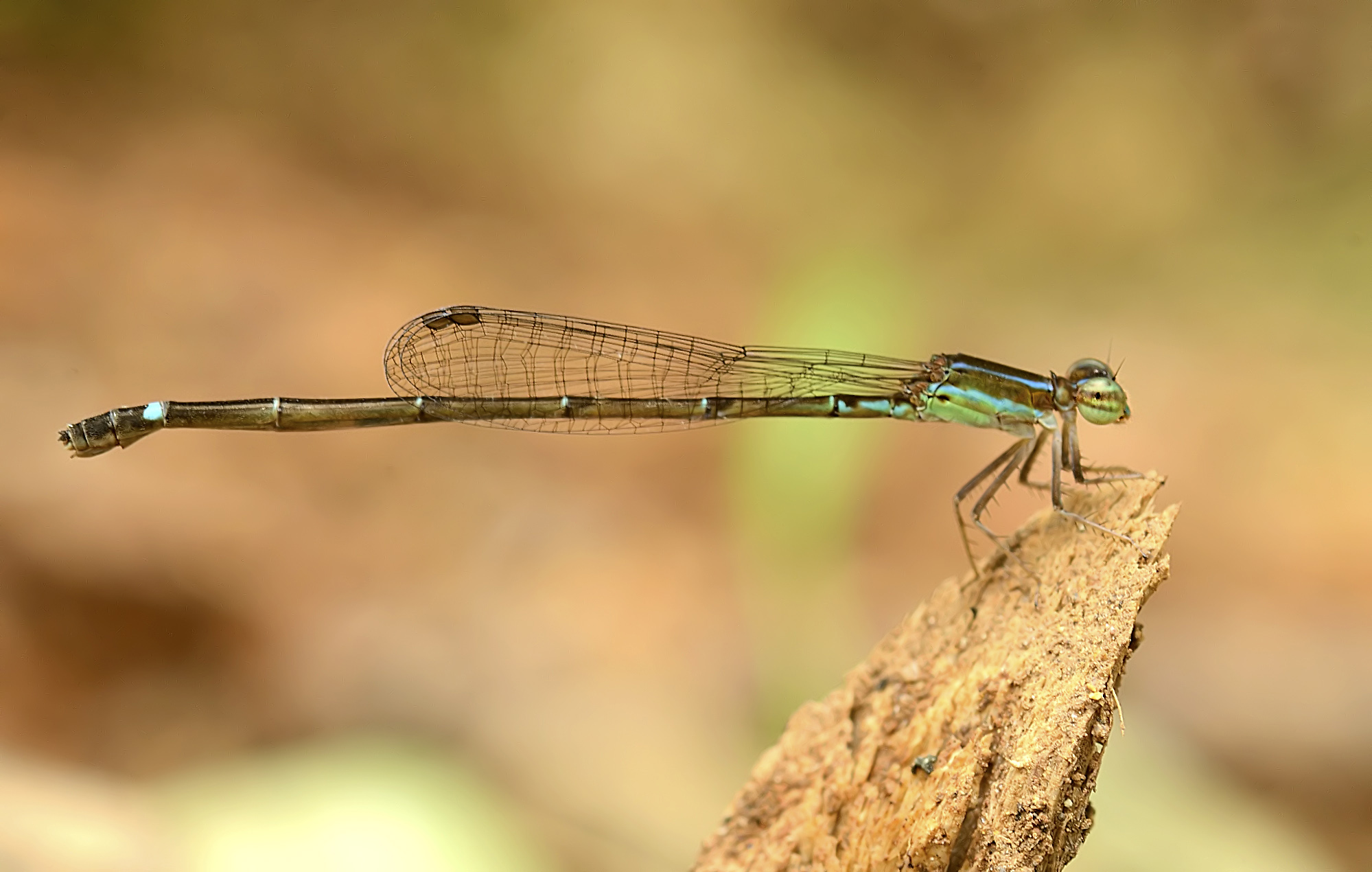
Mortonagrion varralli female

==== Genus: Paracercion ====
===== Species: Paracercion calamorum =====
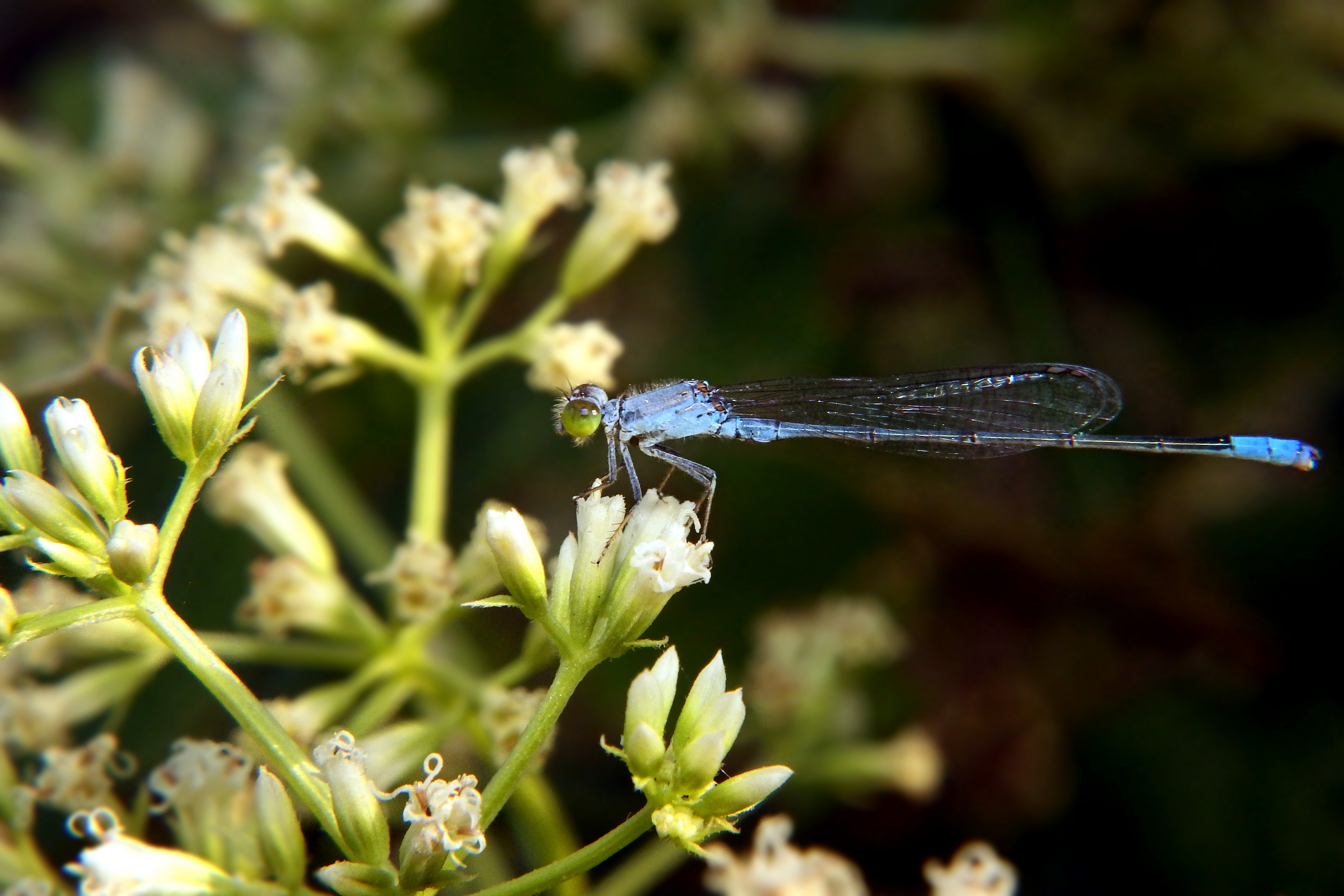
Paracercion calamorum male

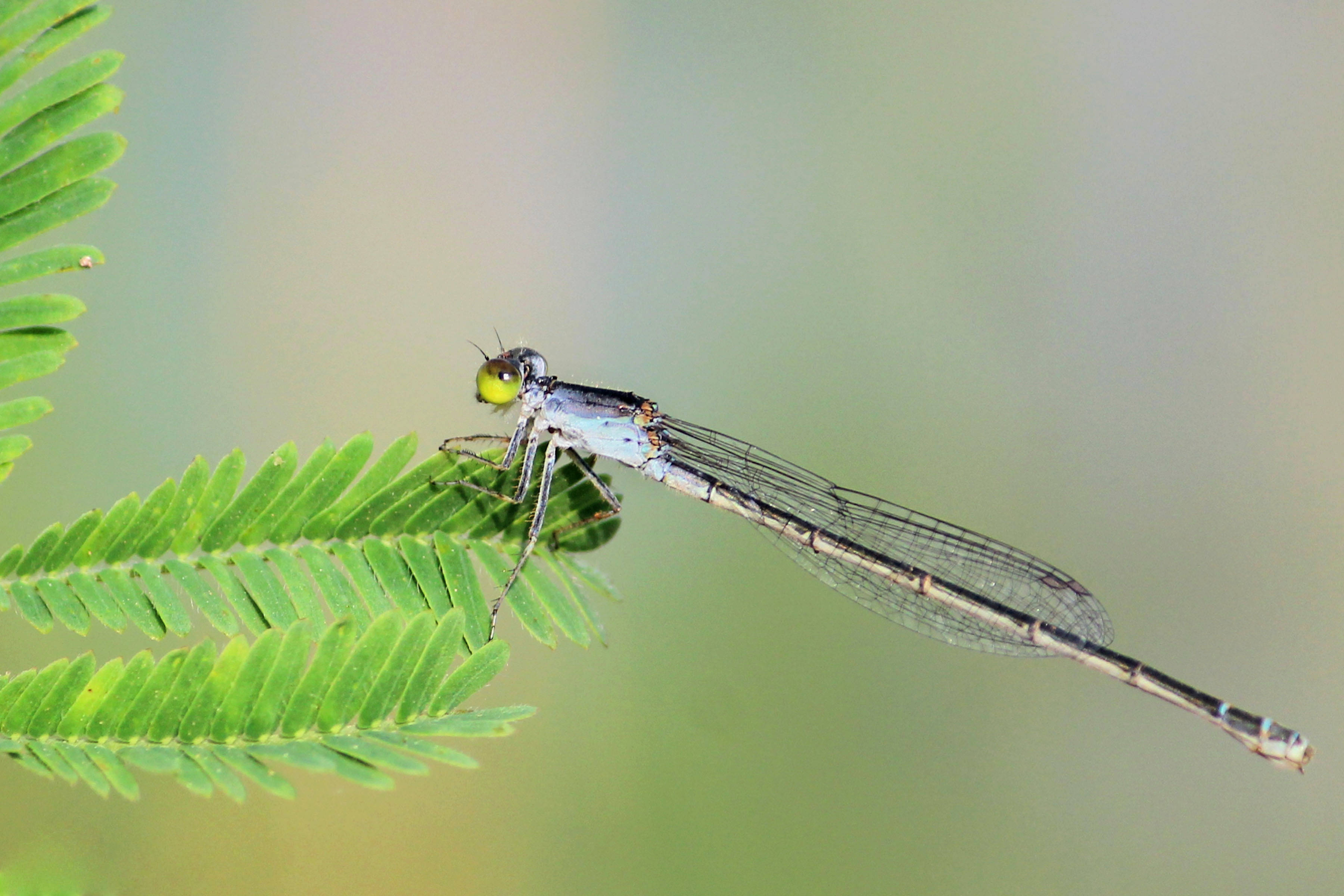
Paracercion calamorum female

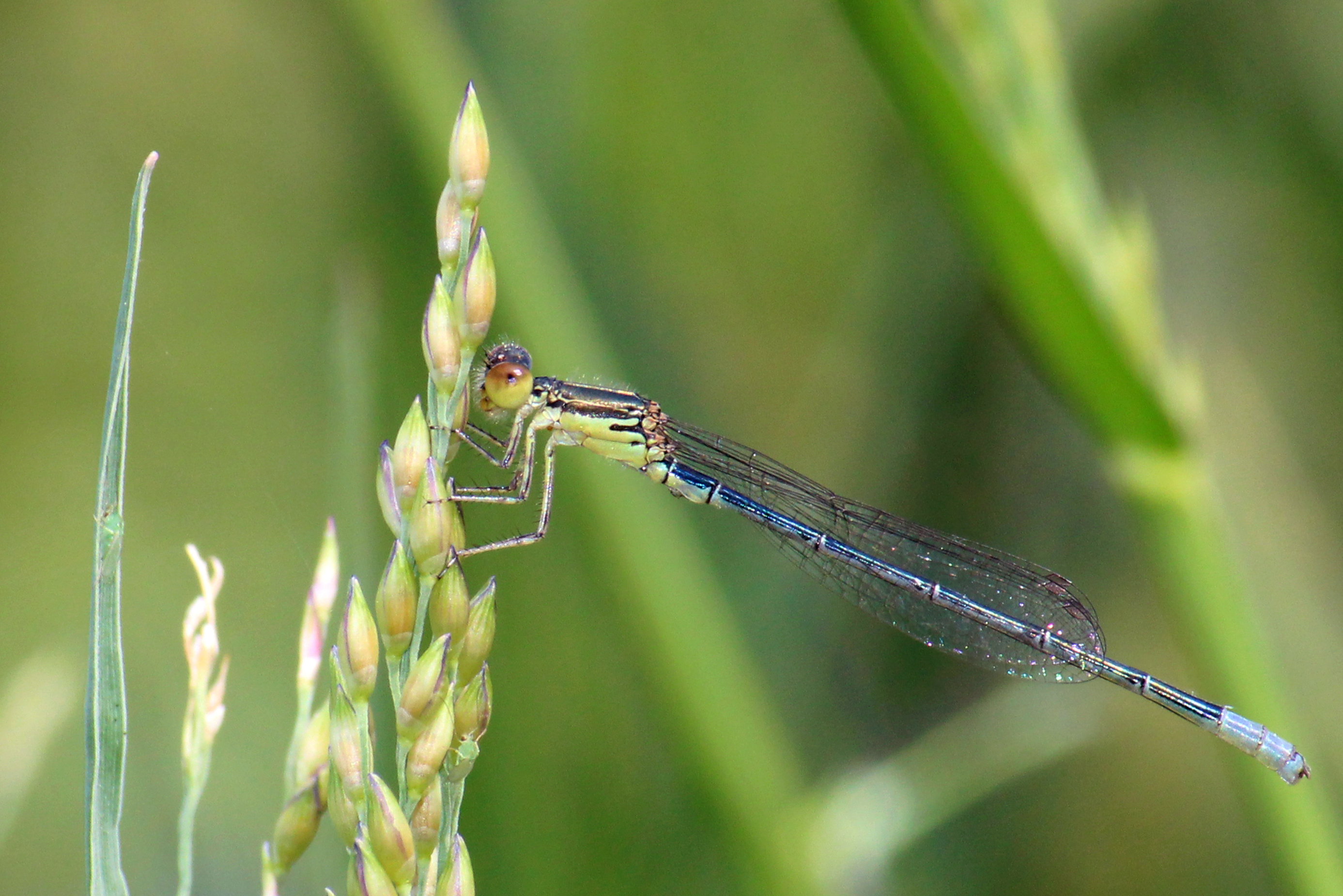
male (sub-adult)

===== Species: Paracercion melanotum =====
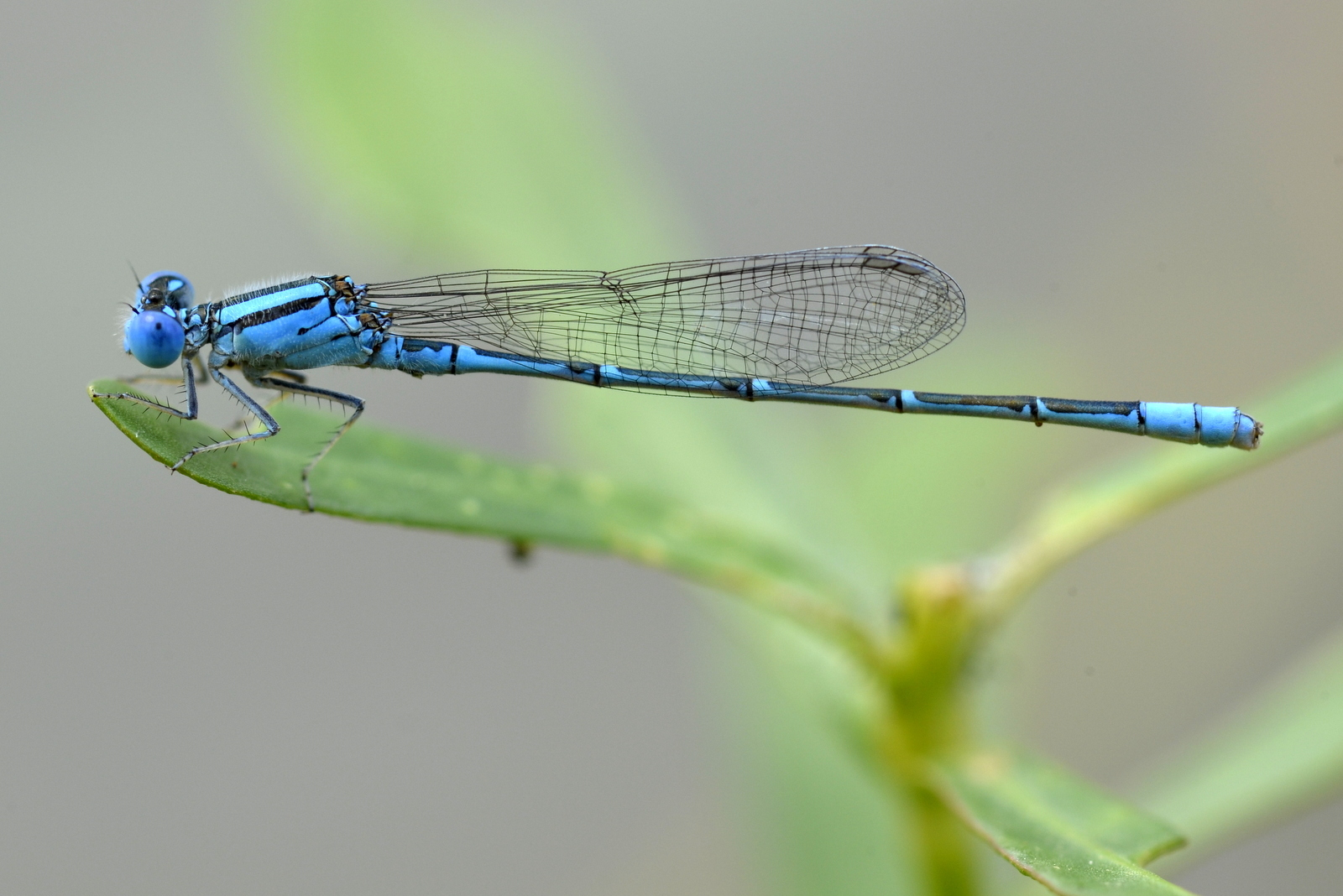
Paracercion melanotum male

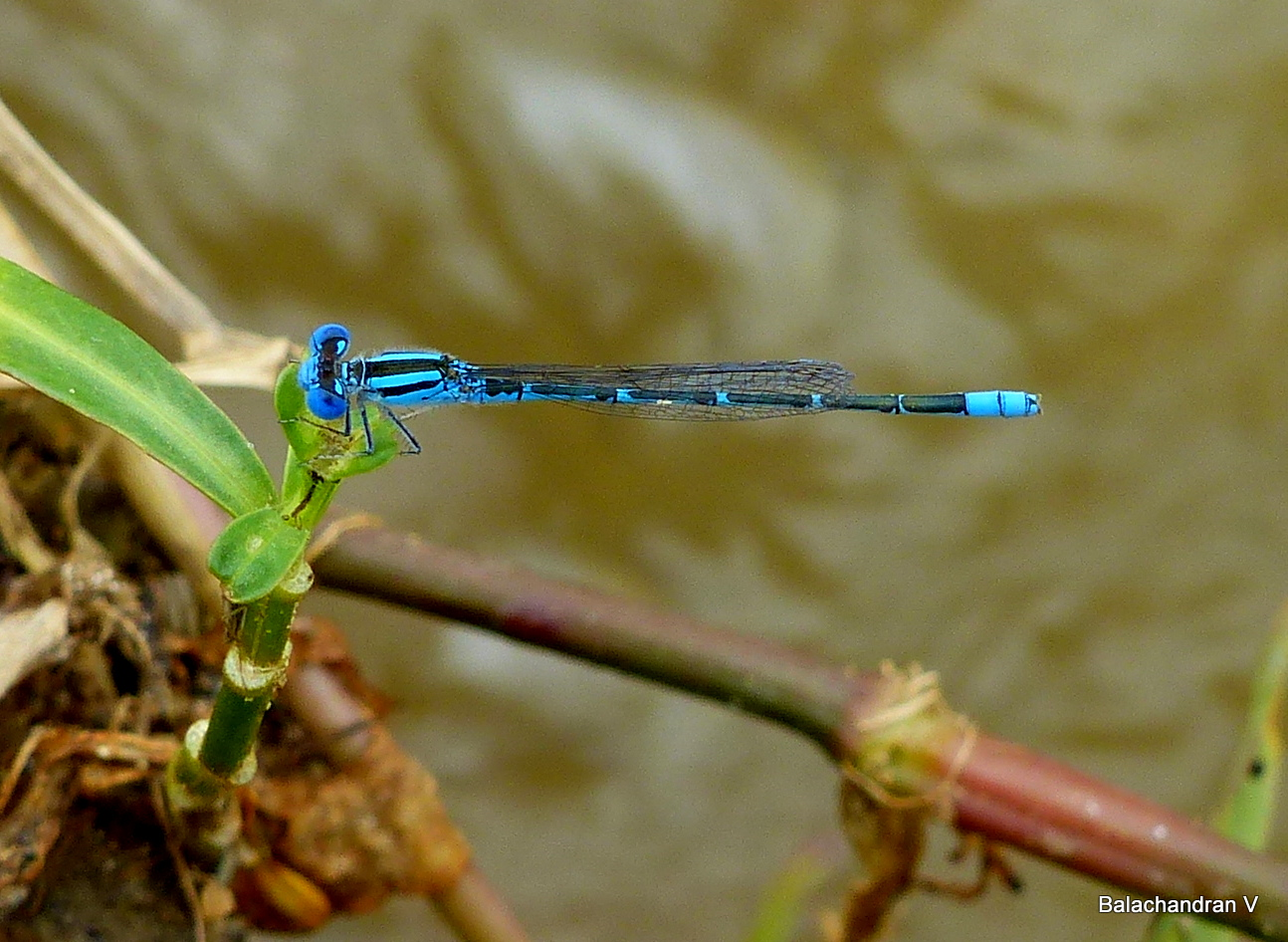
Paracercion melanotum male (dorsal view)

==== Genus: Pseudagrion ====
===== Species: Pseudagrion australasiae =====
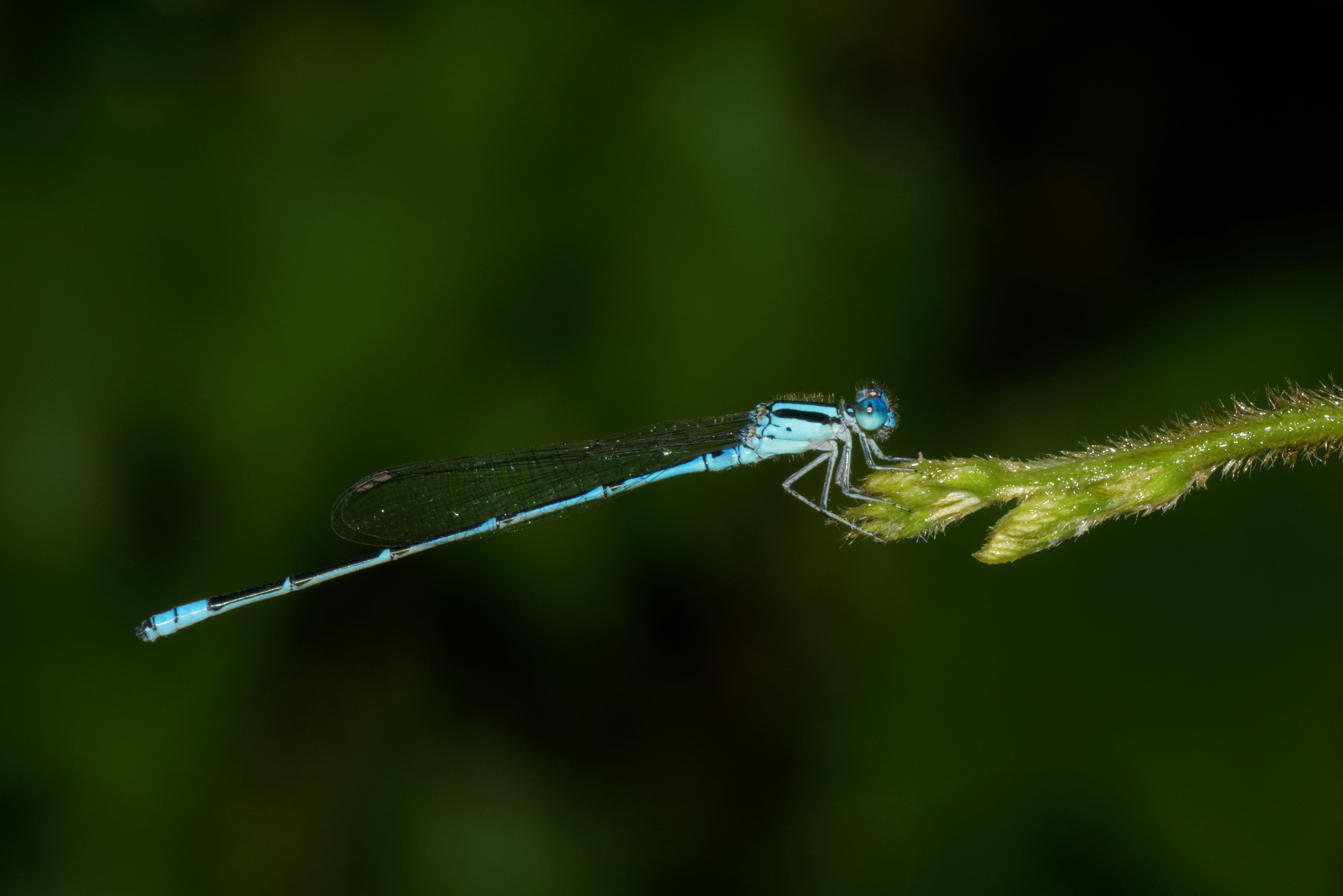
male

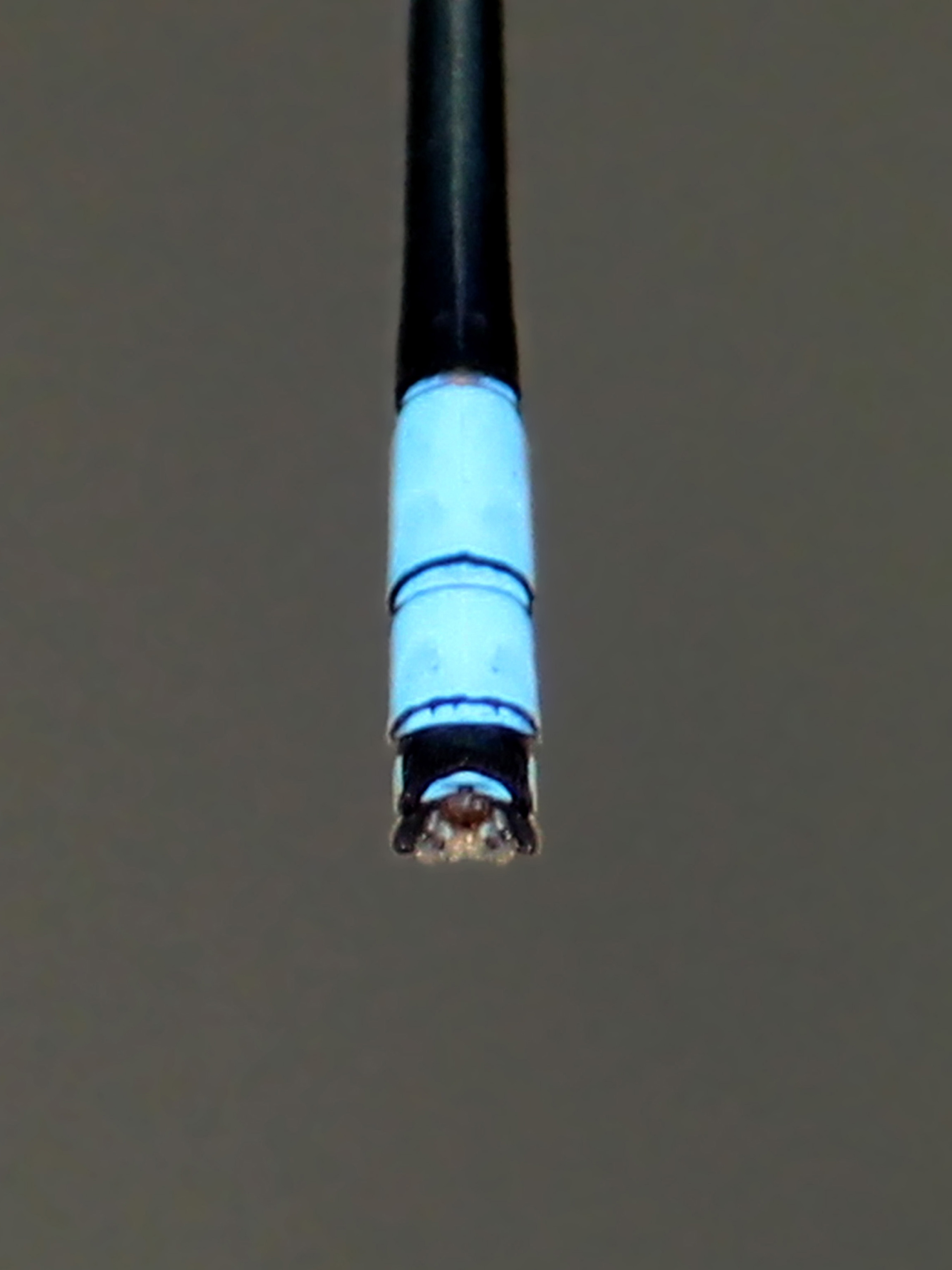
anal appendages (male)

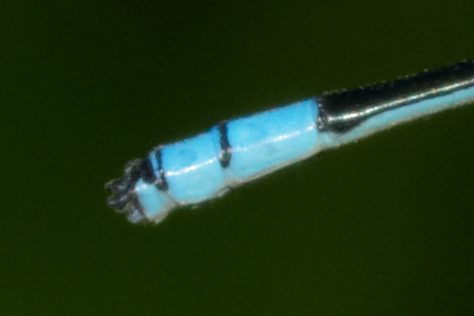
anal appendages (male)

===== Species: Pseudagrion decorum =====
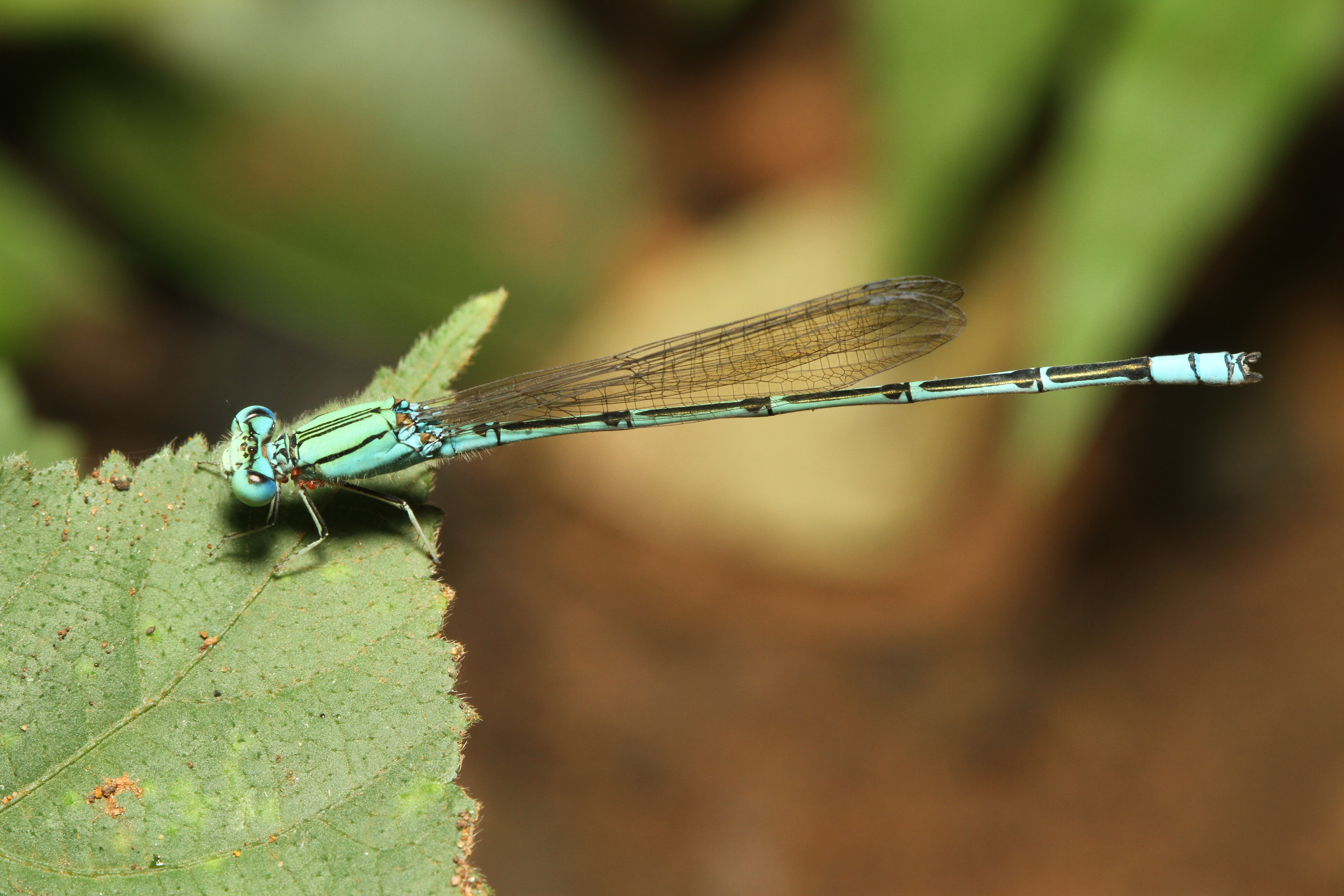
Pseudagrion decorum male

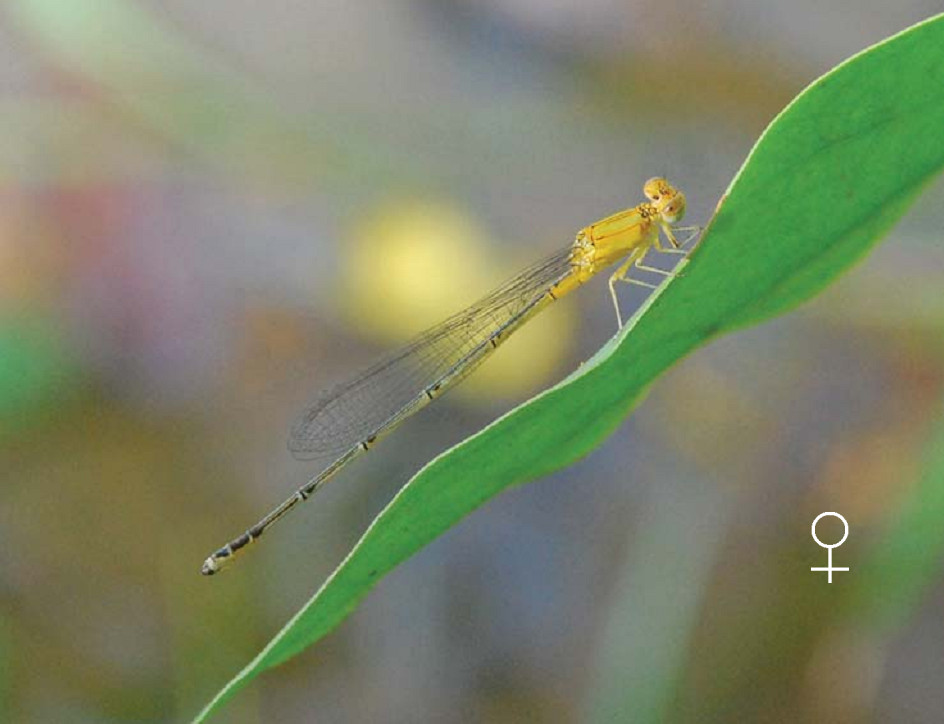
Pseudagrion decorum female

===== Species: Pseudagrion indicum =====
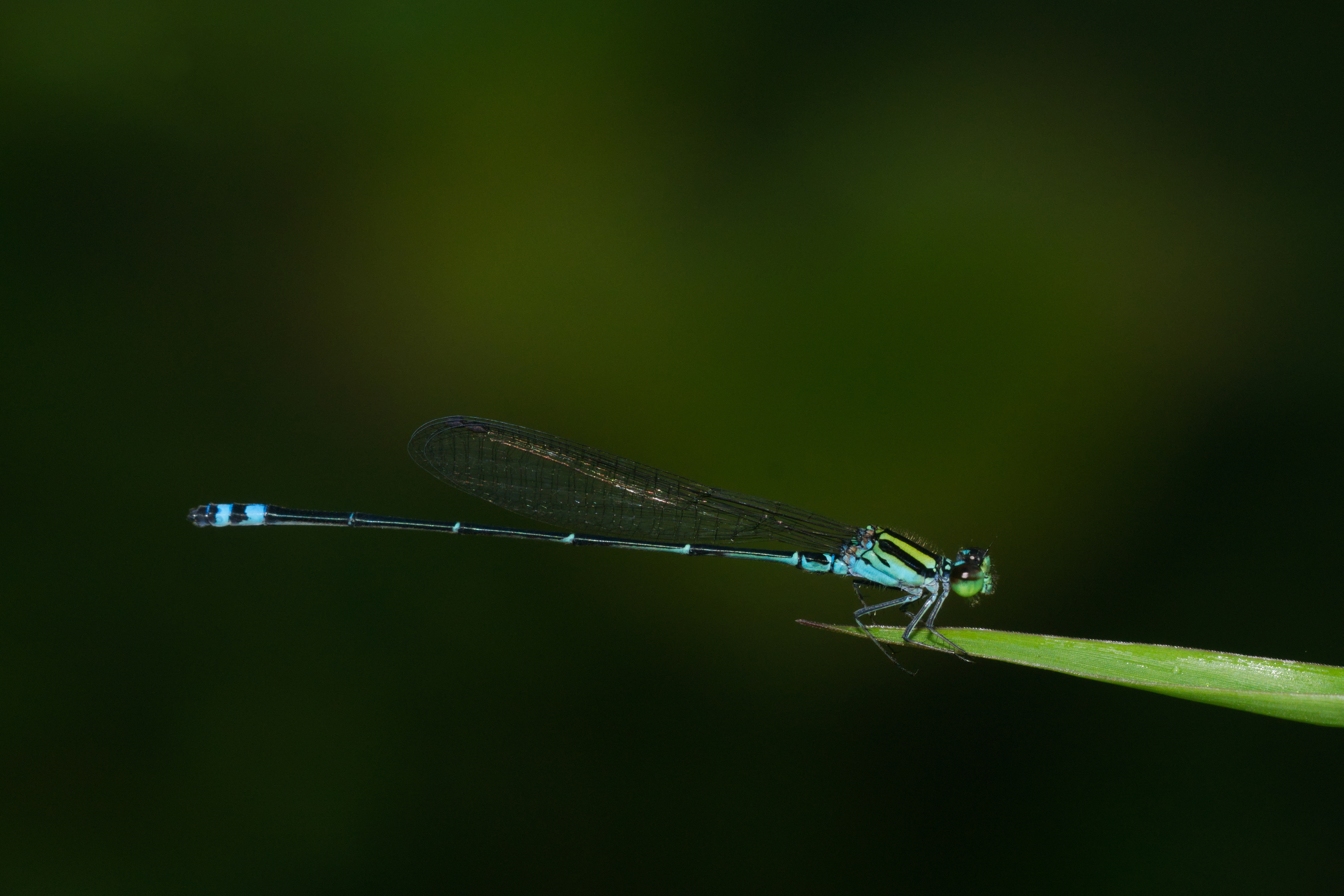
Pseudagrion indicum male

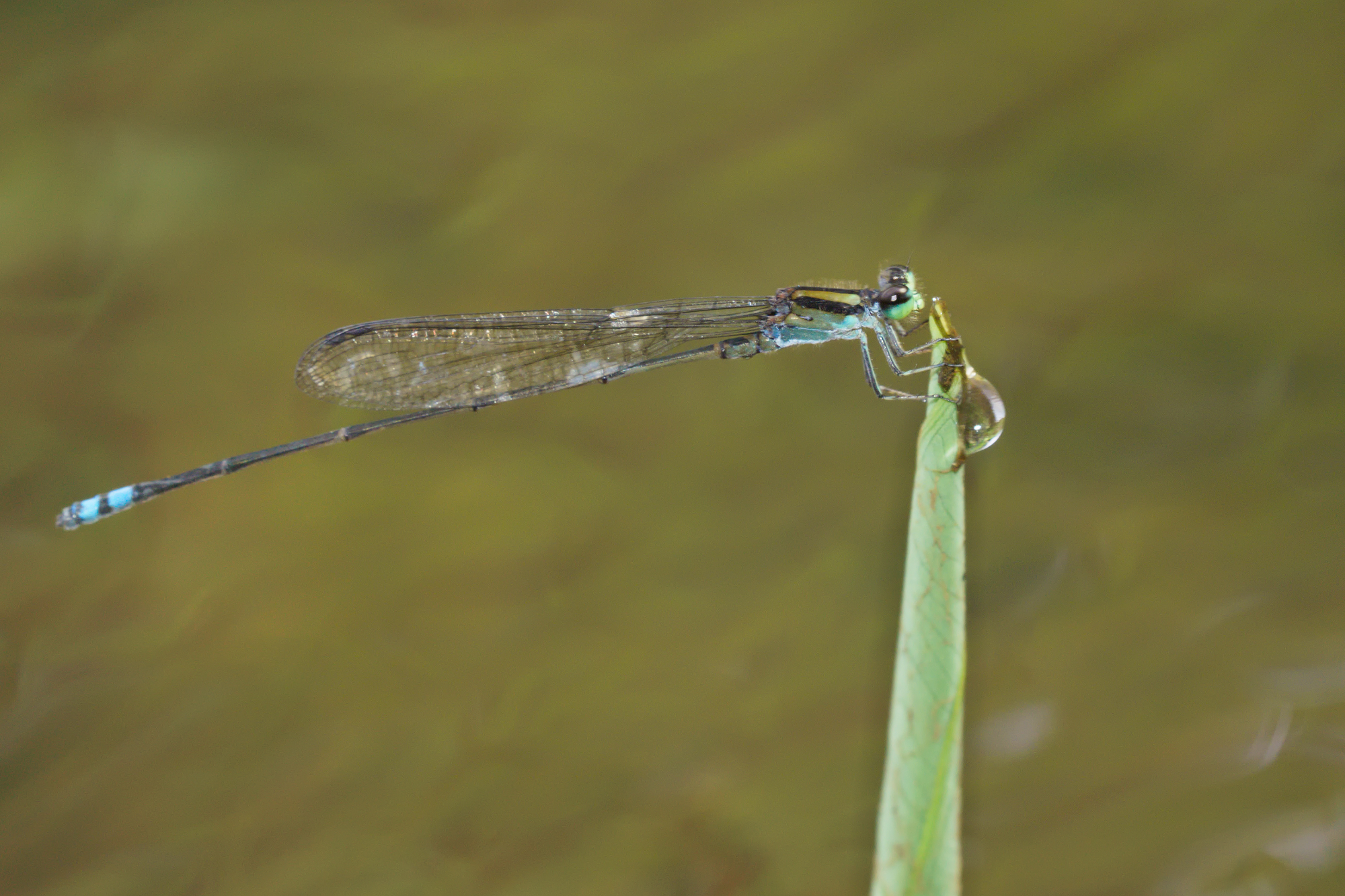
male

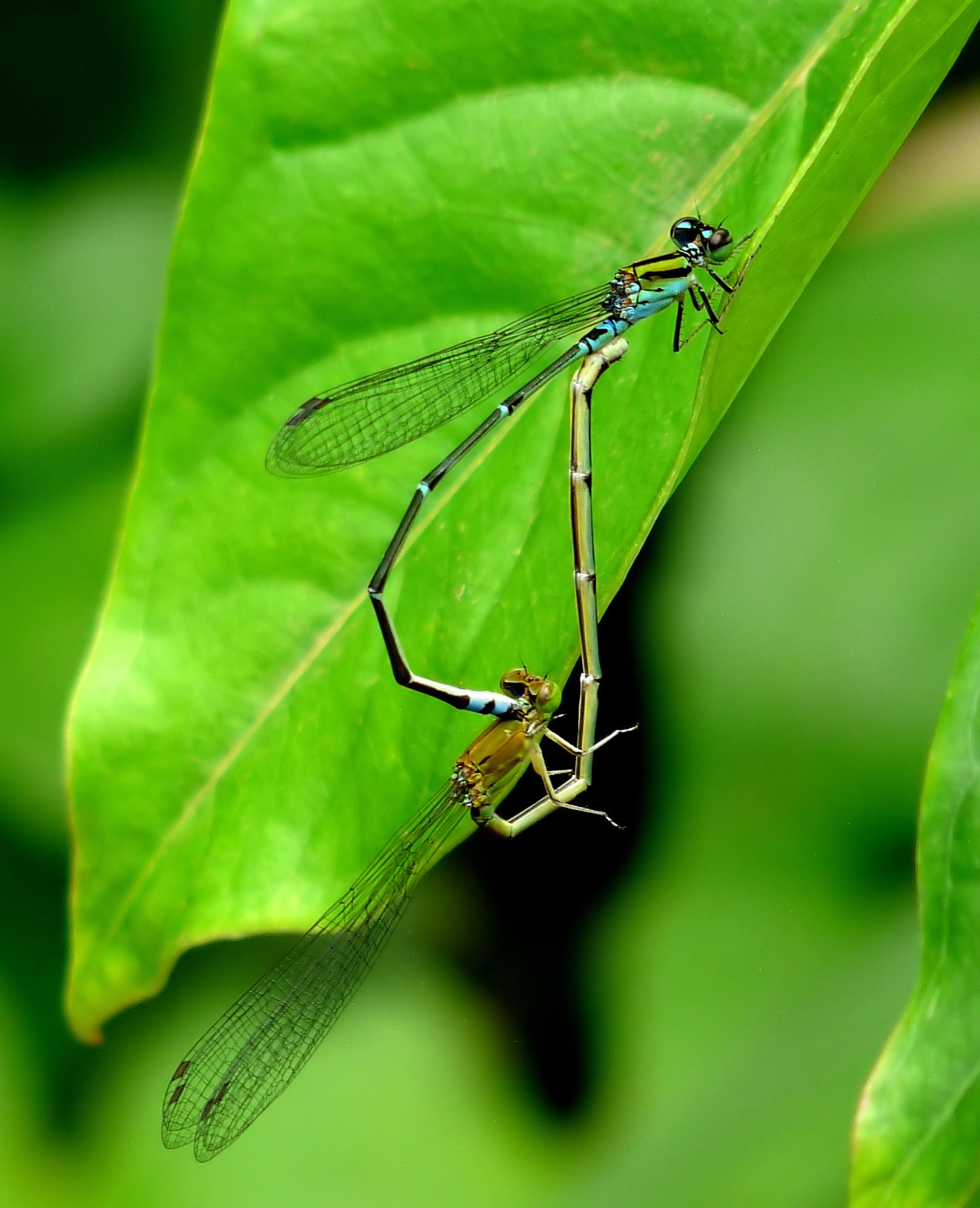
Pseudagrion indicum mating pair

===== Species: Pseudagrion malabaricum =====
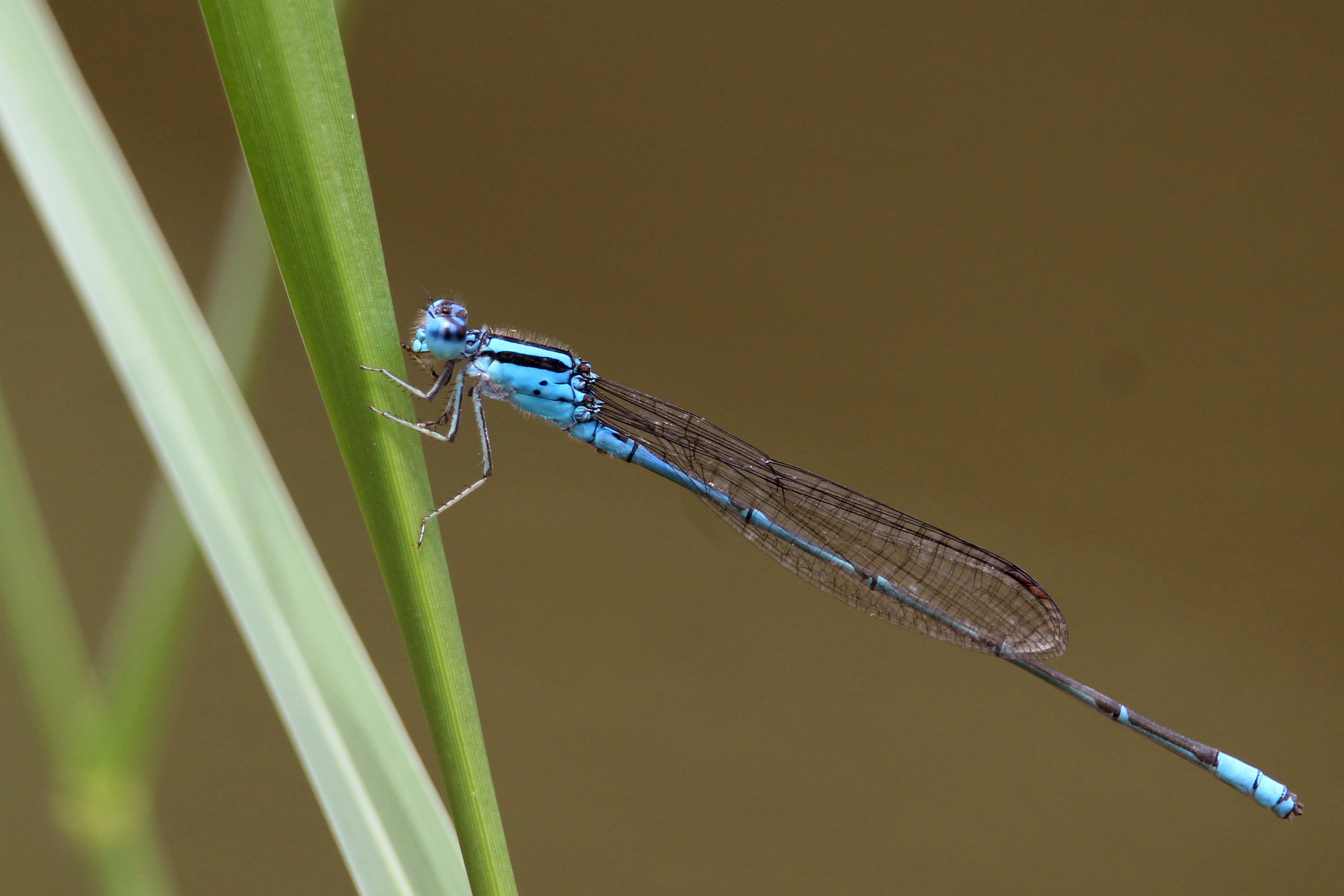
Male

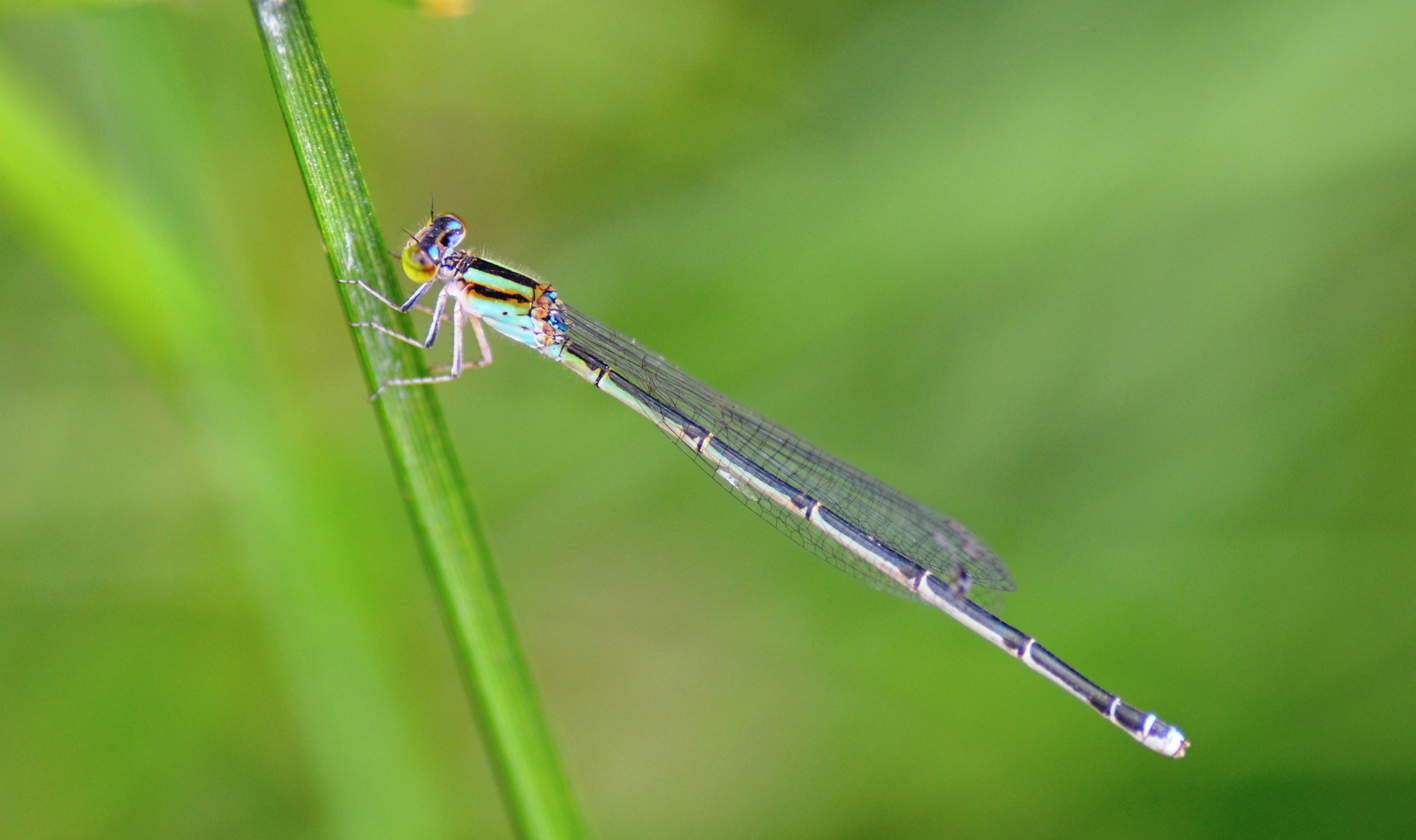
Female

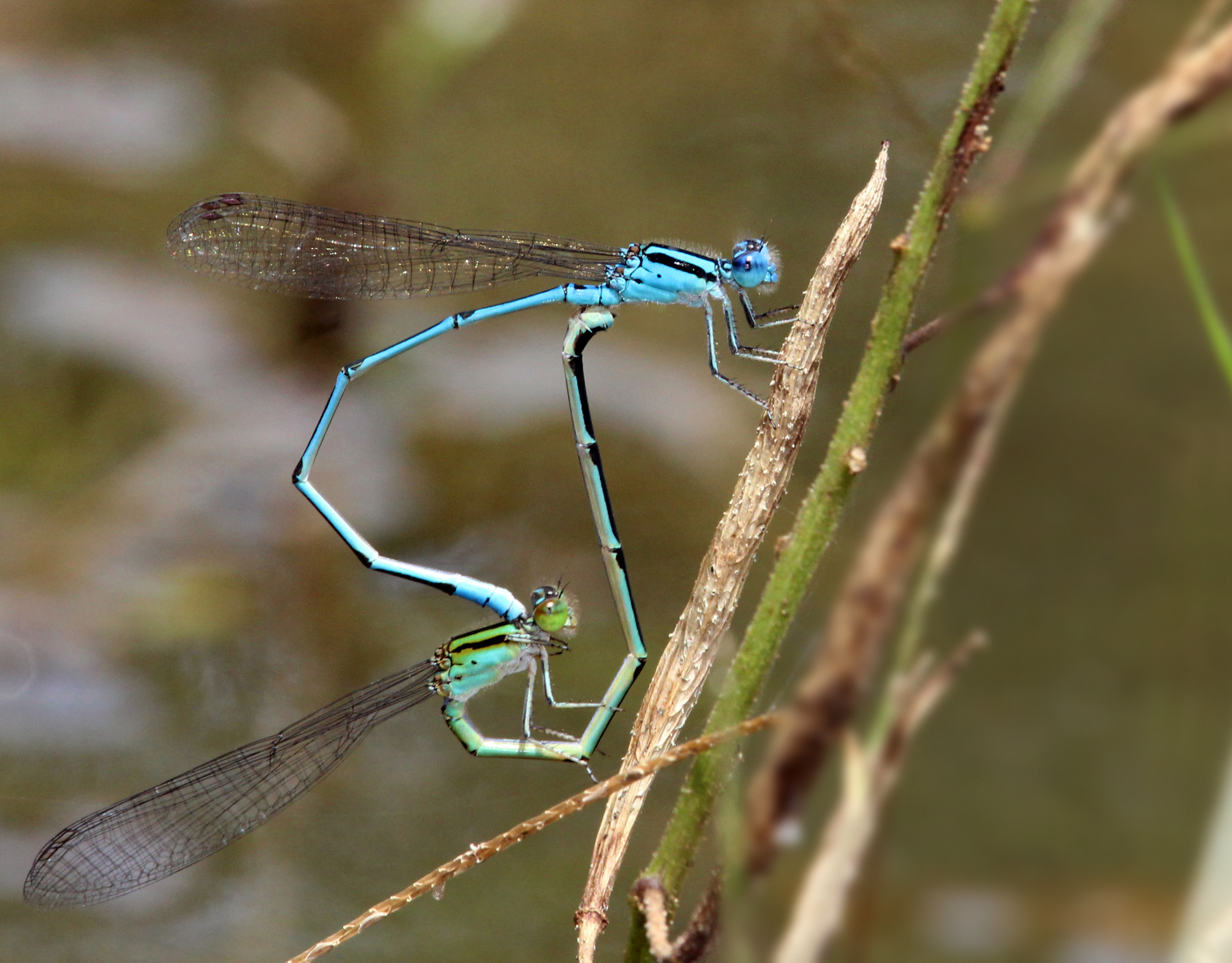
Mating pair

===== Species: Pseudagrion microcephalum =====
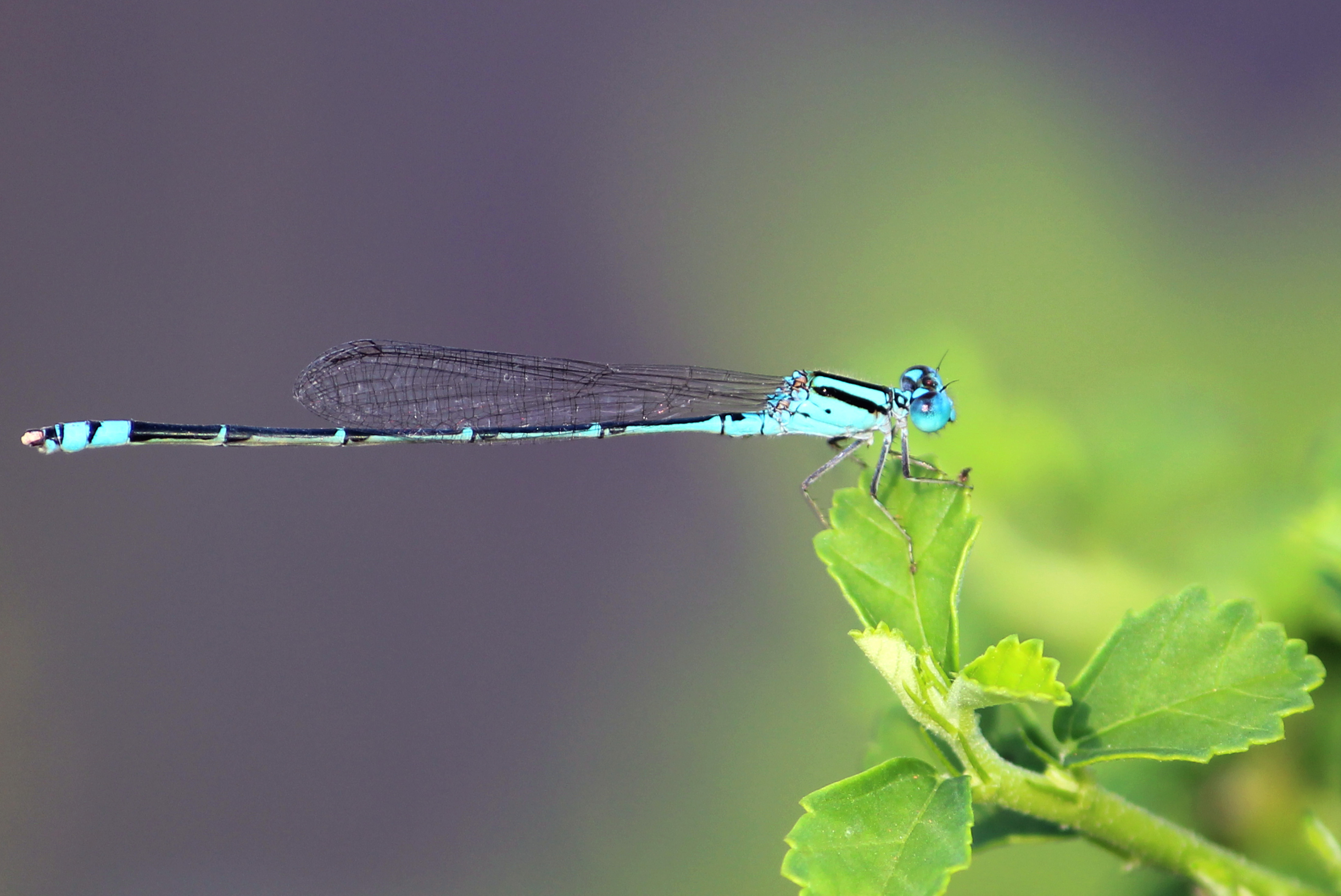
Pseudagrion microcephalum male

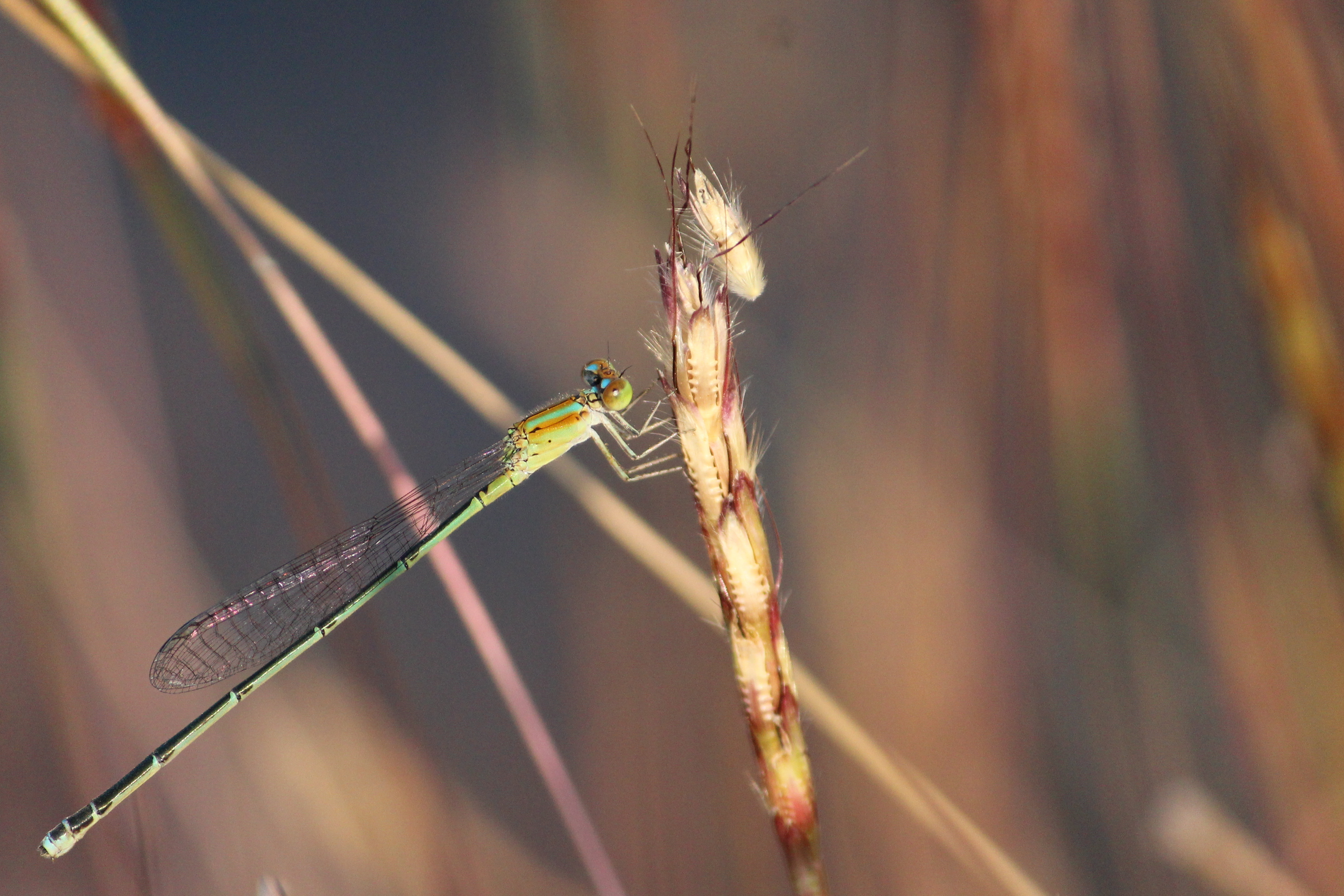
Pseudagrion microcephalum female

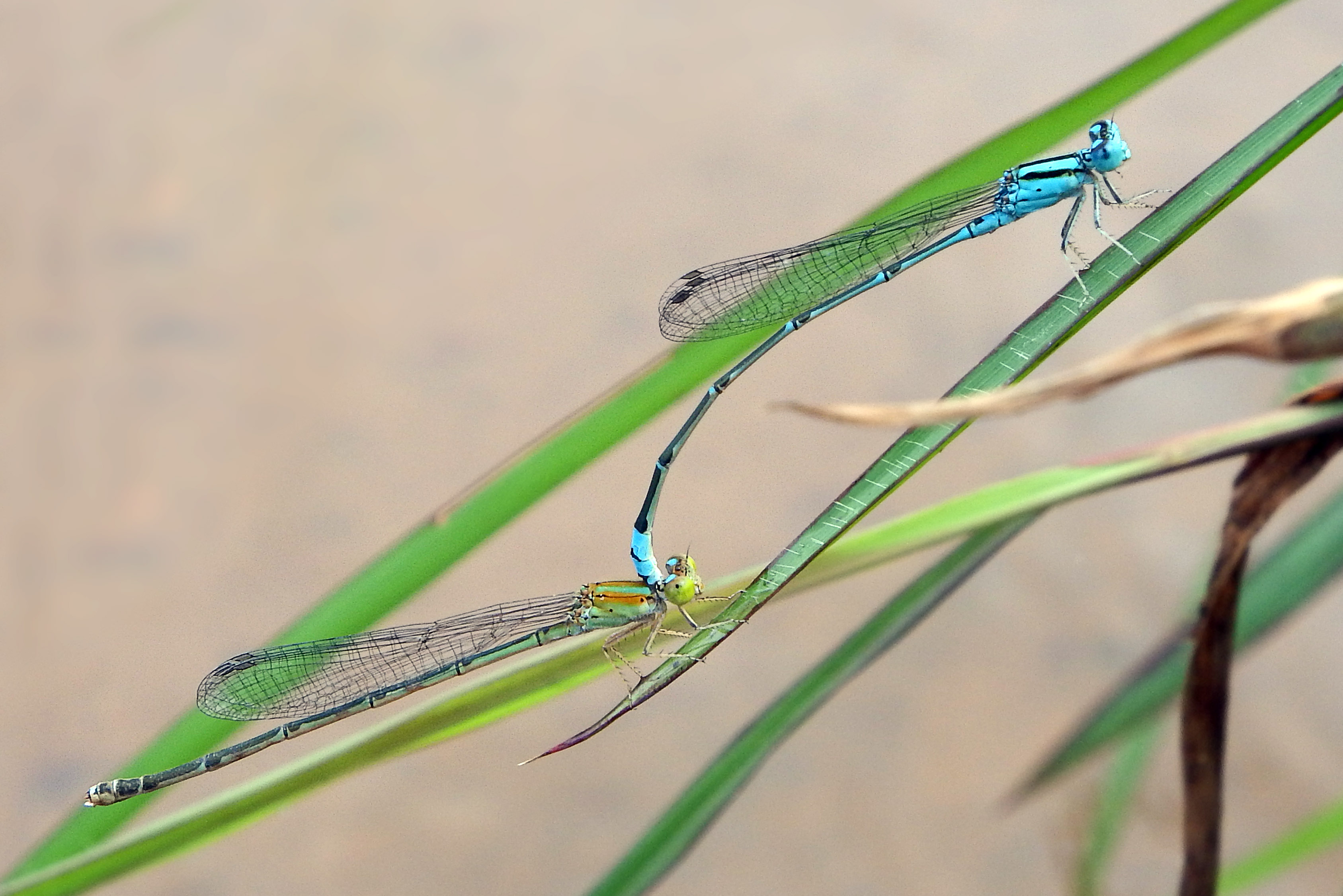
tandem pair

===== Species: Pseudagrion rubriceps =====
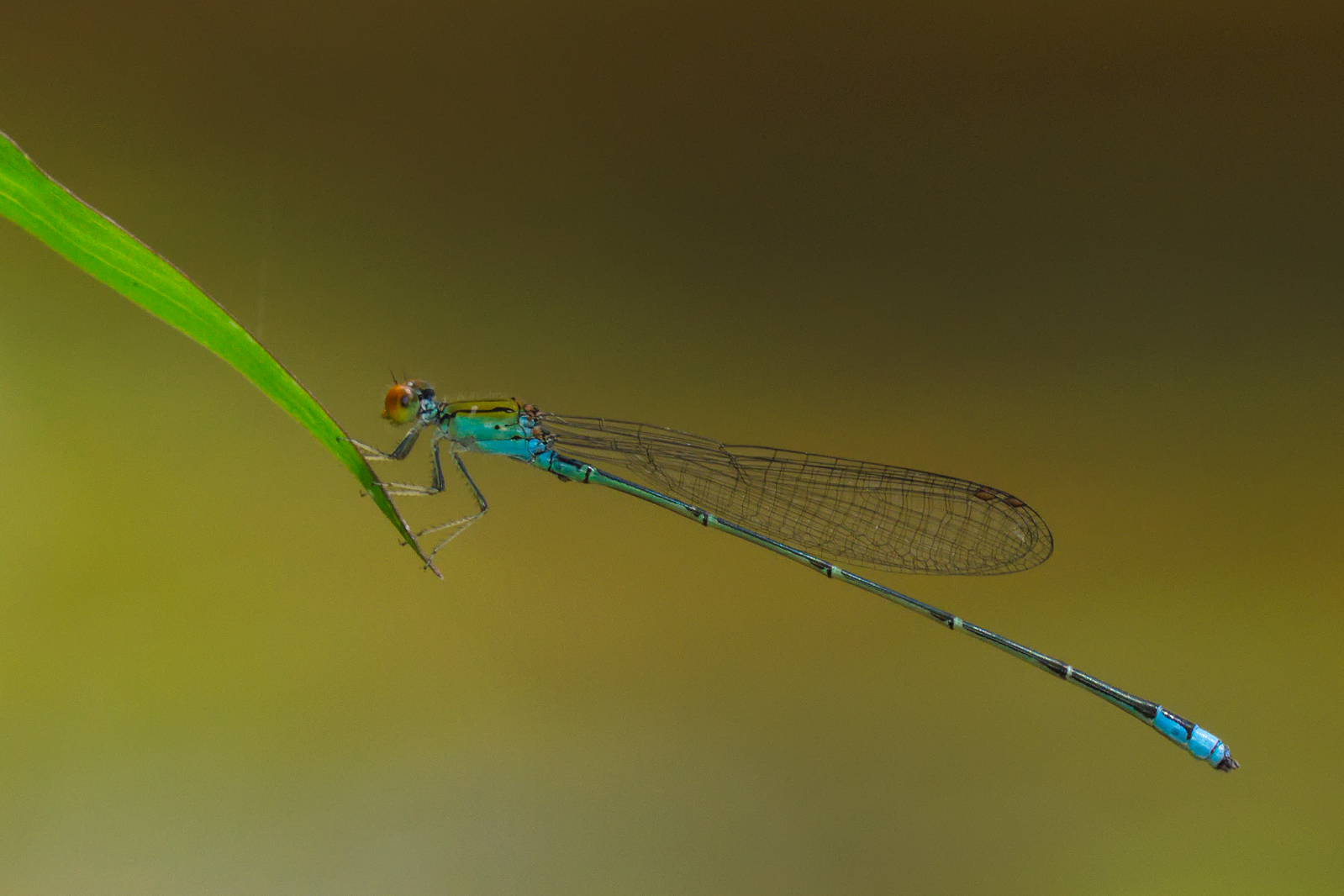
Pseudagrion rubriceps male

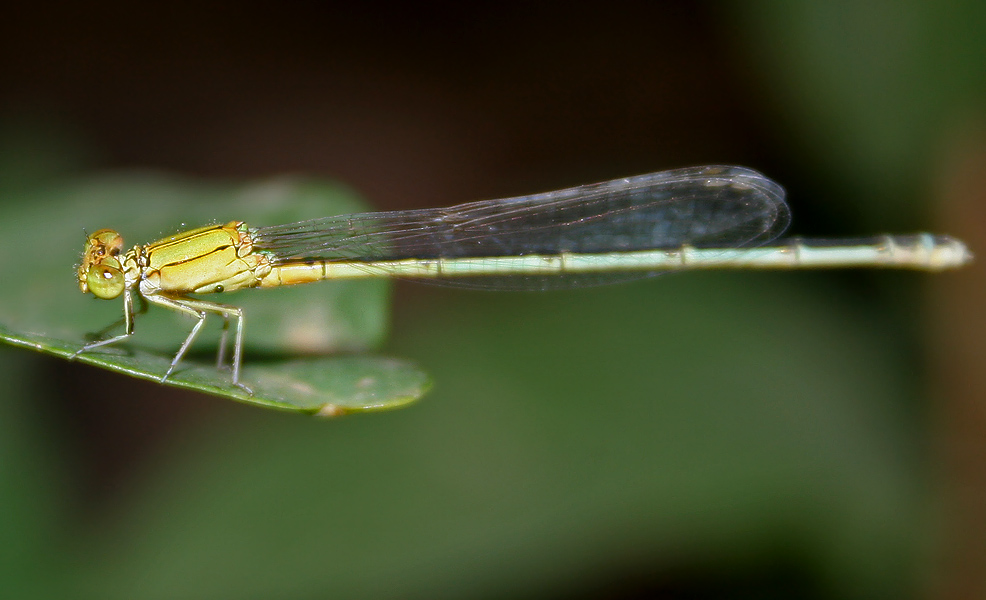
Pseudagrion rubriceps female

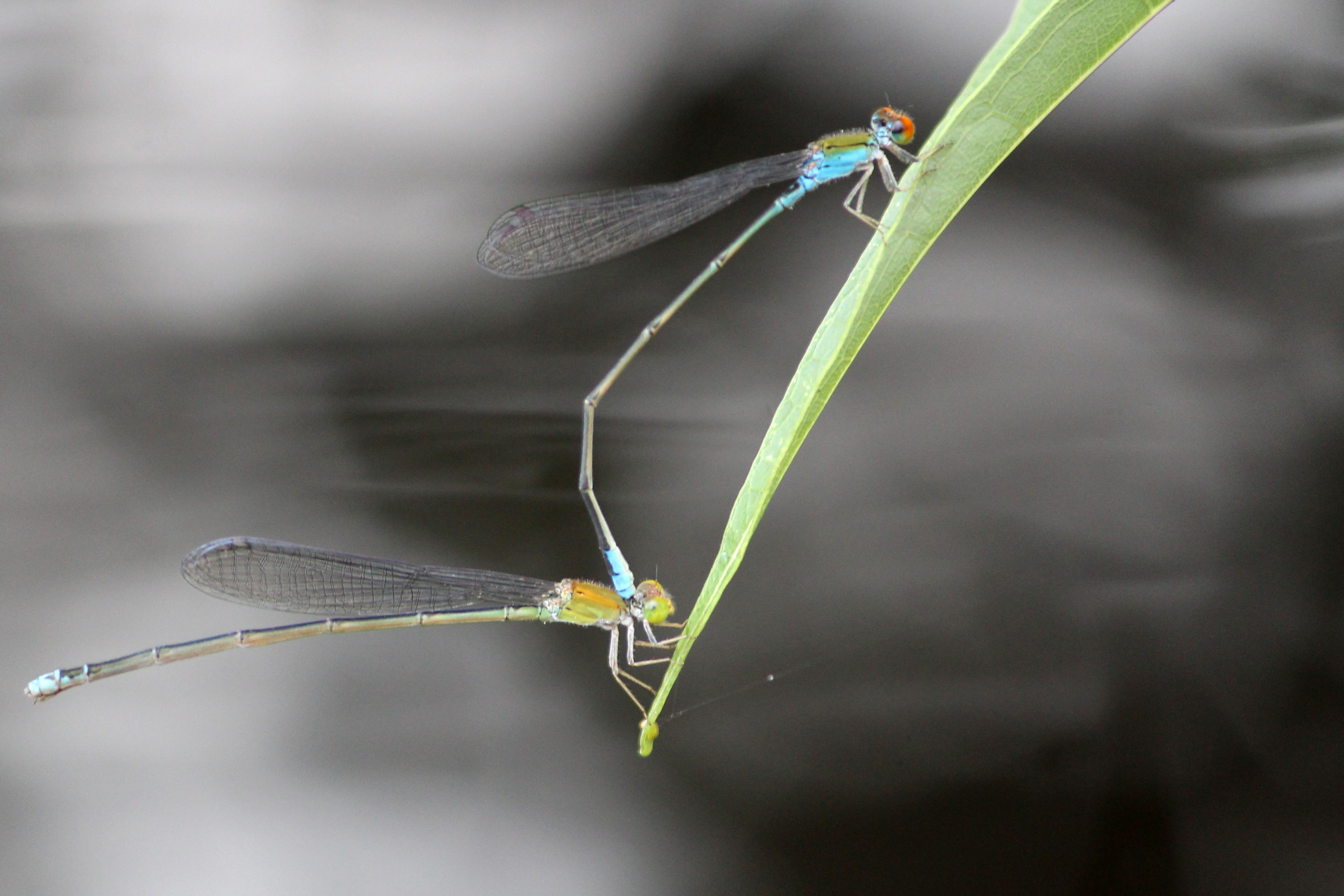
Tandem pair

== Suborder: Anisoptera (Dragonflies) ==
=== Family: Aeshnidae (Hawkers or Darners) ===
==== Genus: Anaciaeschna ====
===== Species: Anaciaeschna jaspidea =====
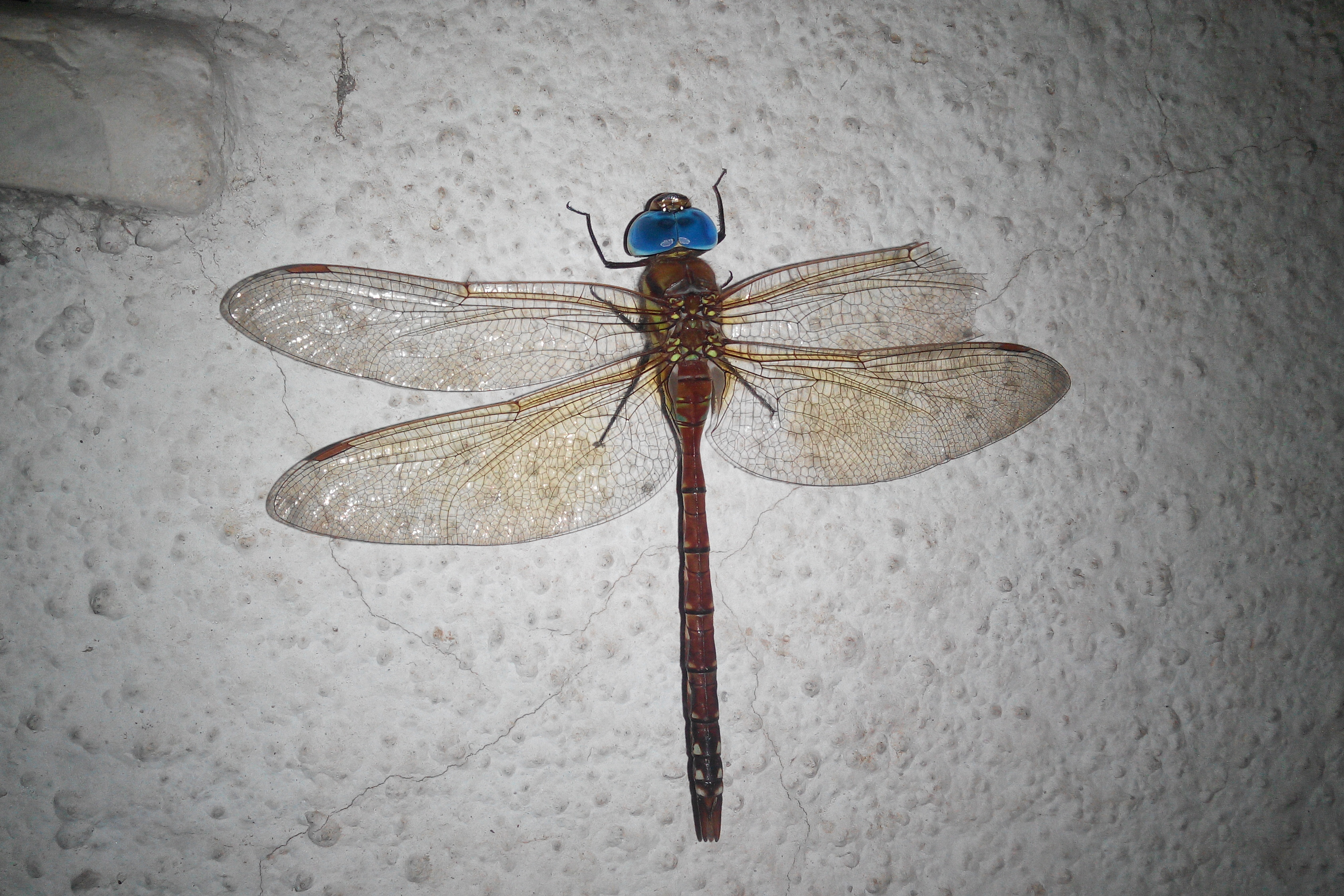
Anaciaeschna jaspidea, male (dorsal view)

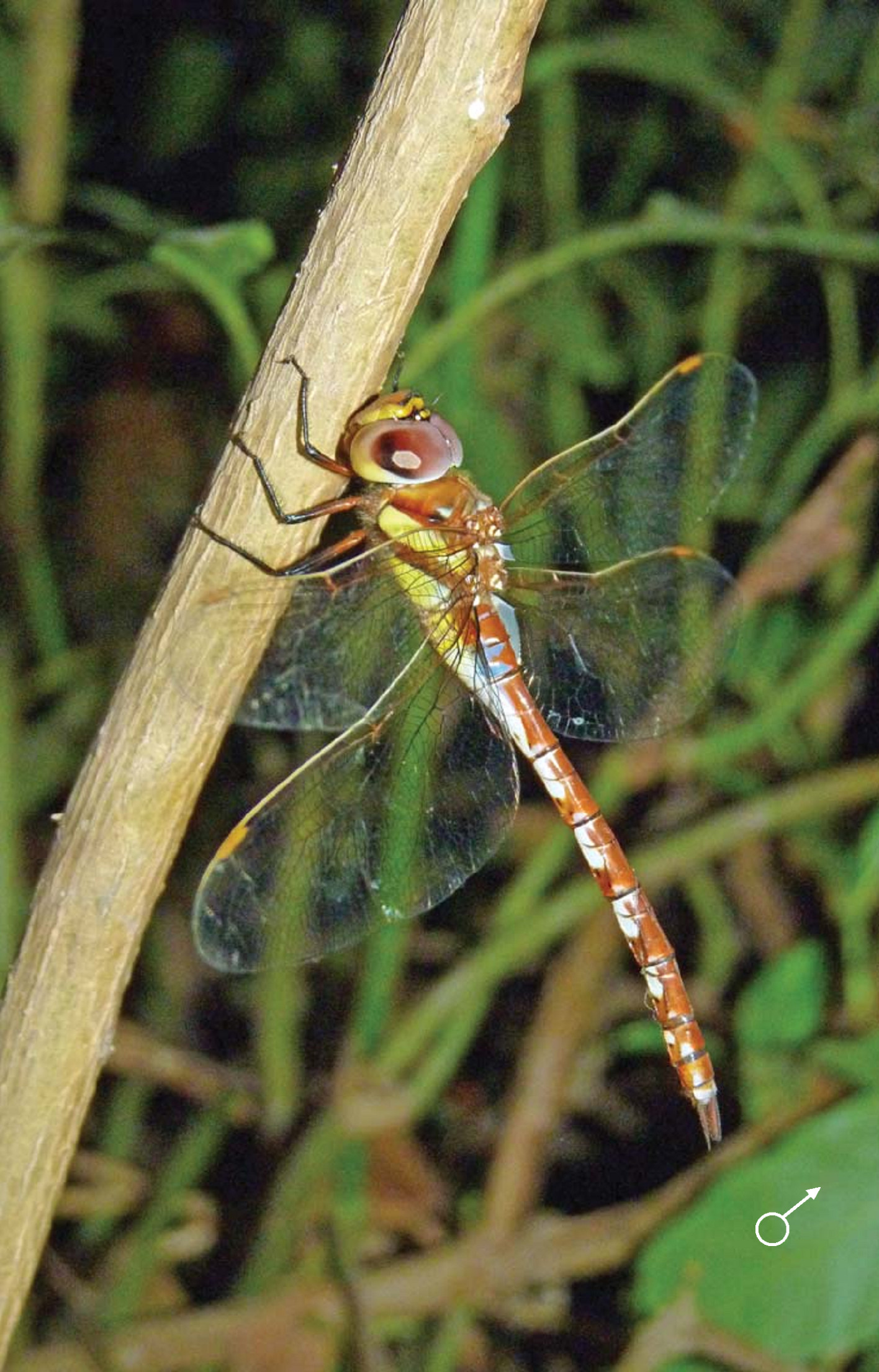
Anaciaeschna jaspidea, male (ventral view)

===== Species: Anaciaeschna martini =====
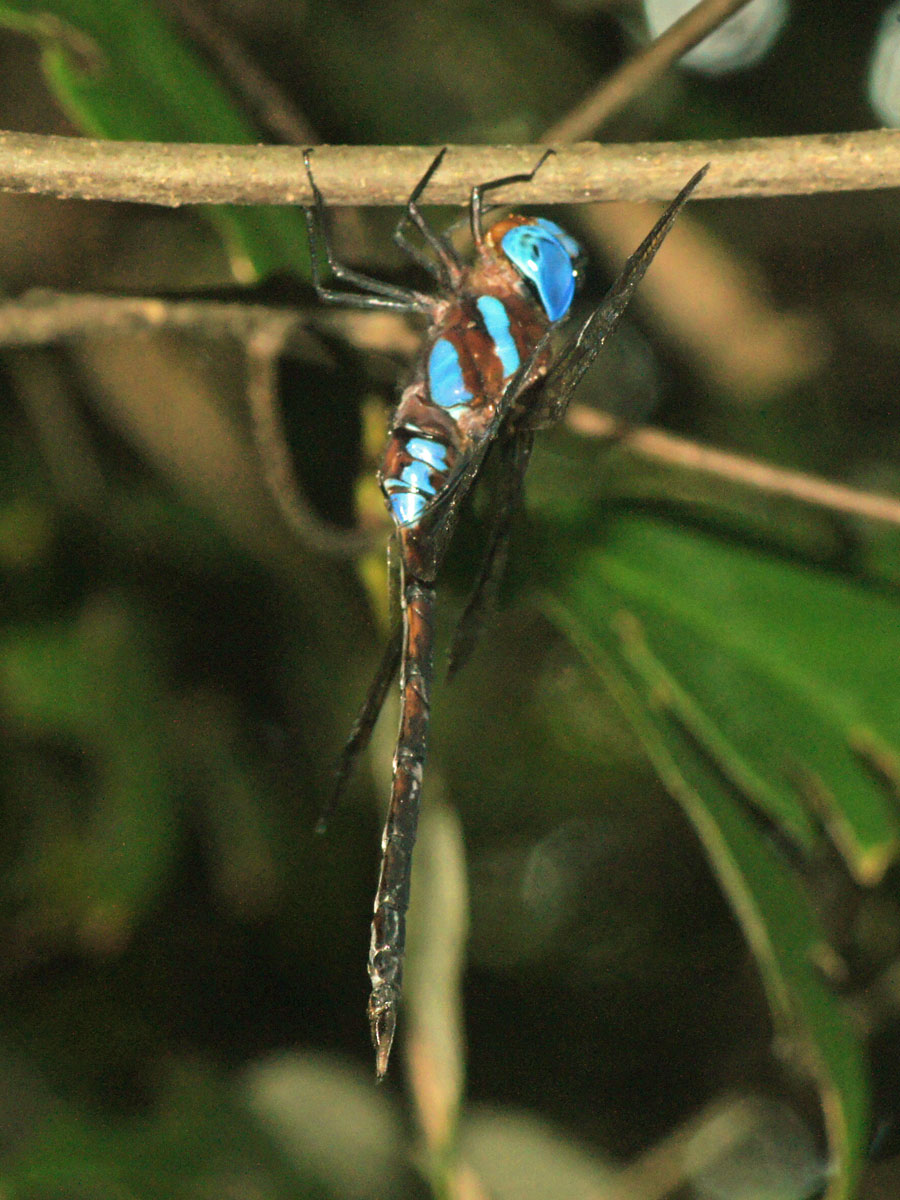
male

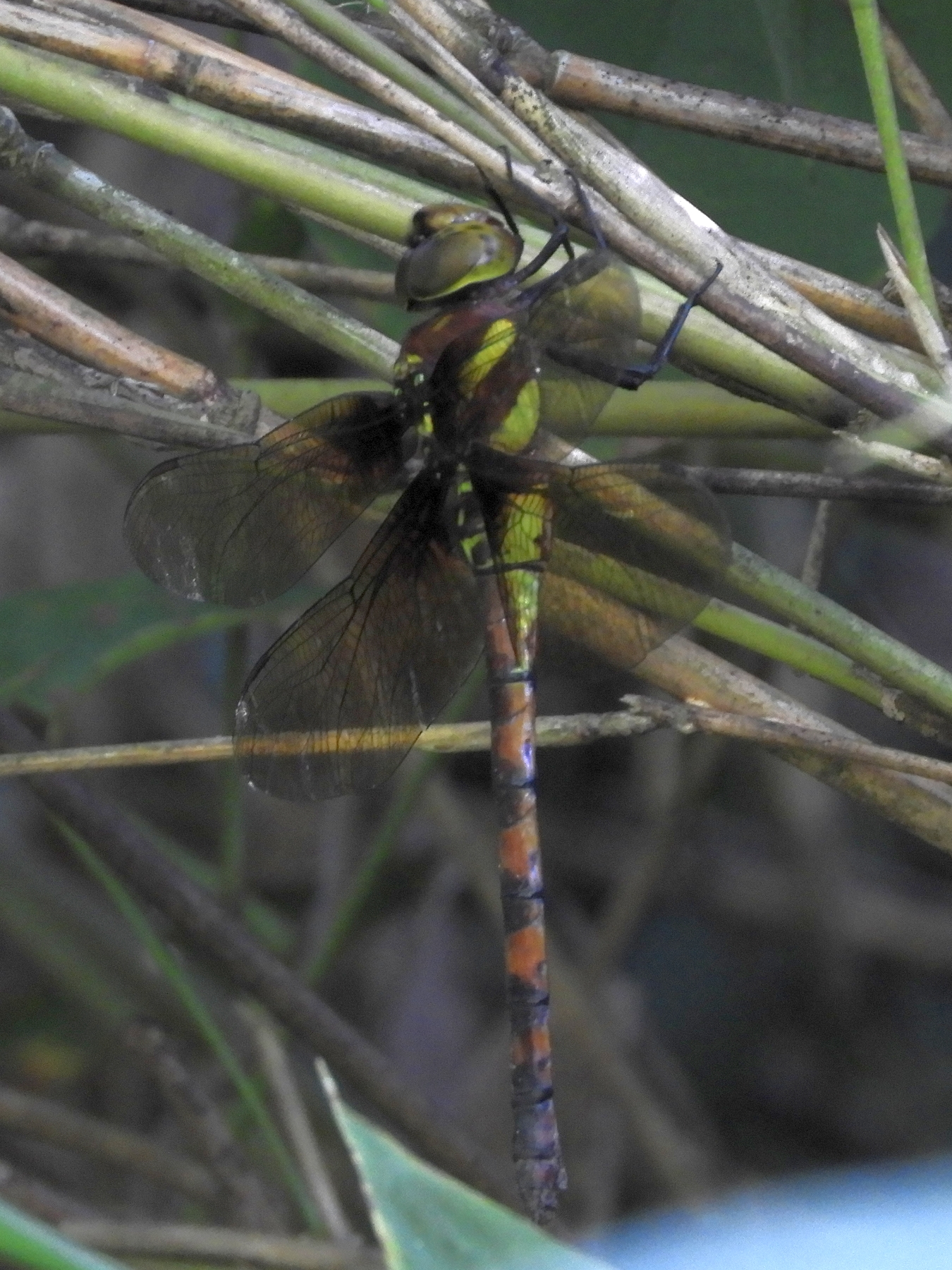
female

==== Genus: Anax ====
===== Species: Anax ephippiger =====
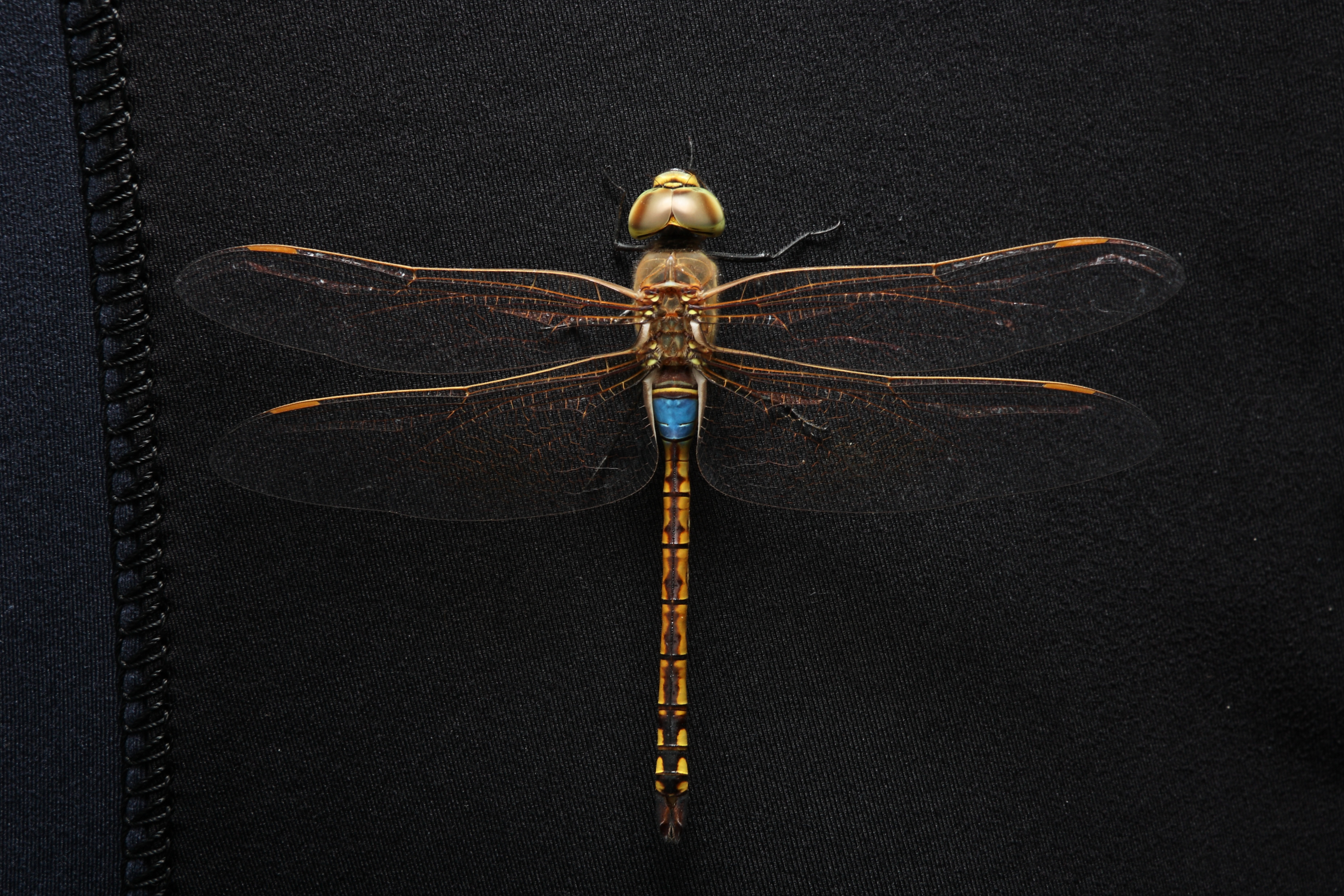
male

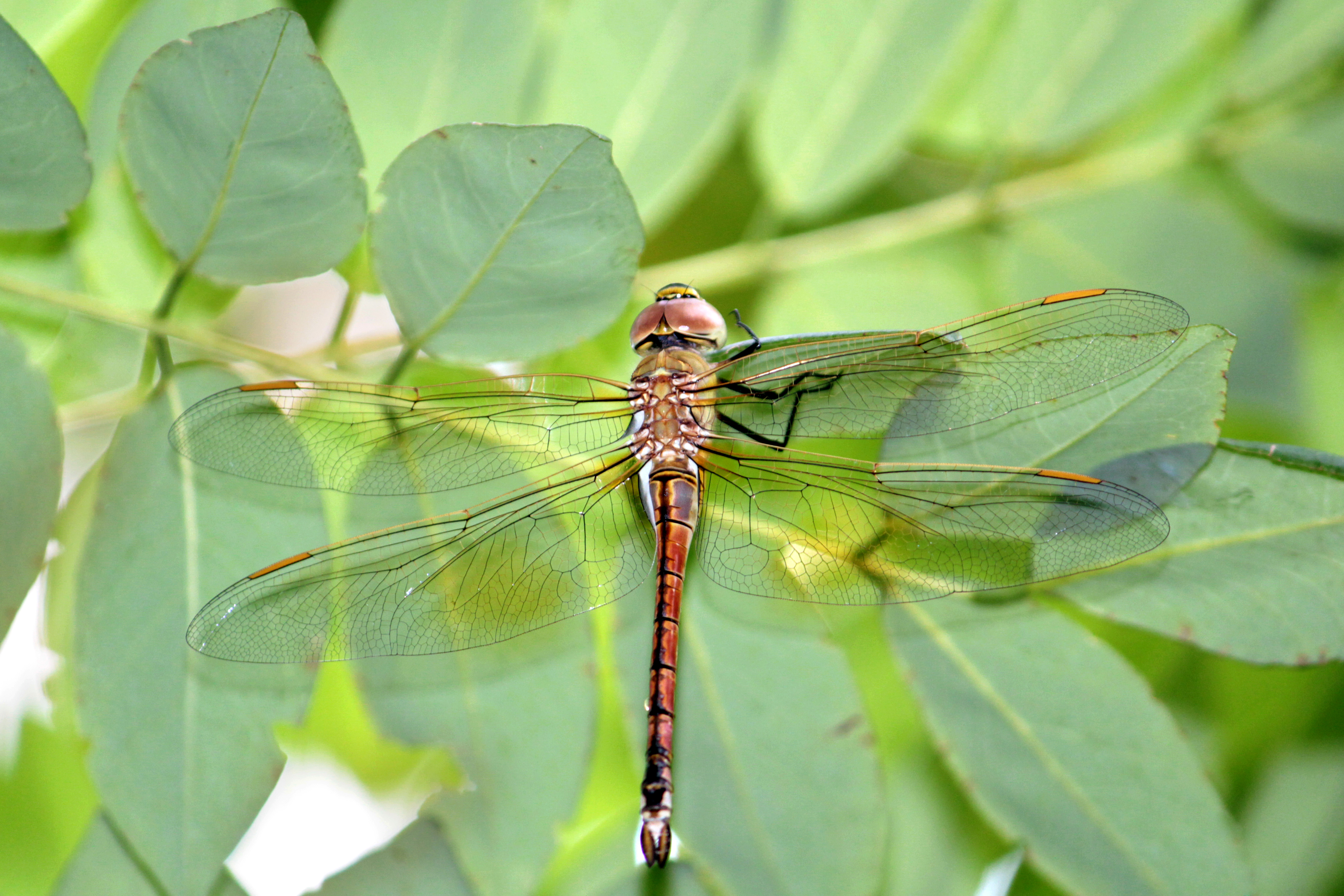
female

===== Species: Anax guttatus =====
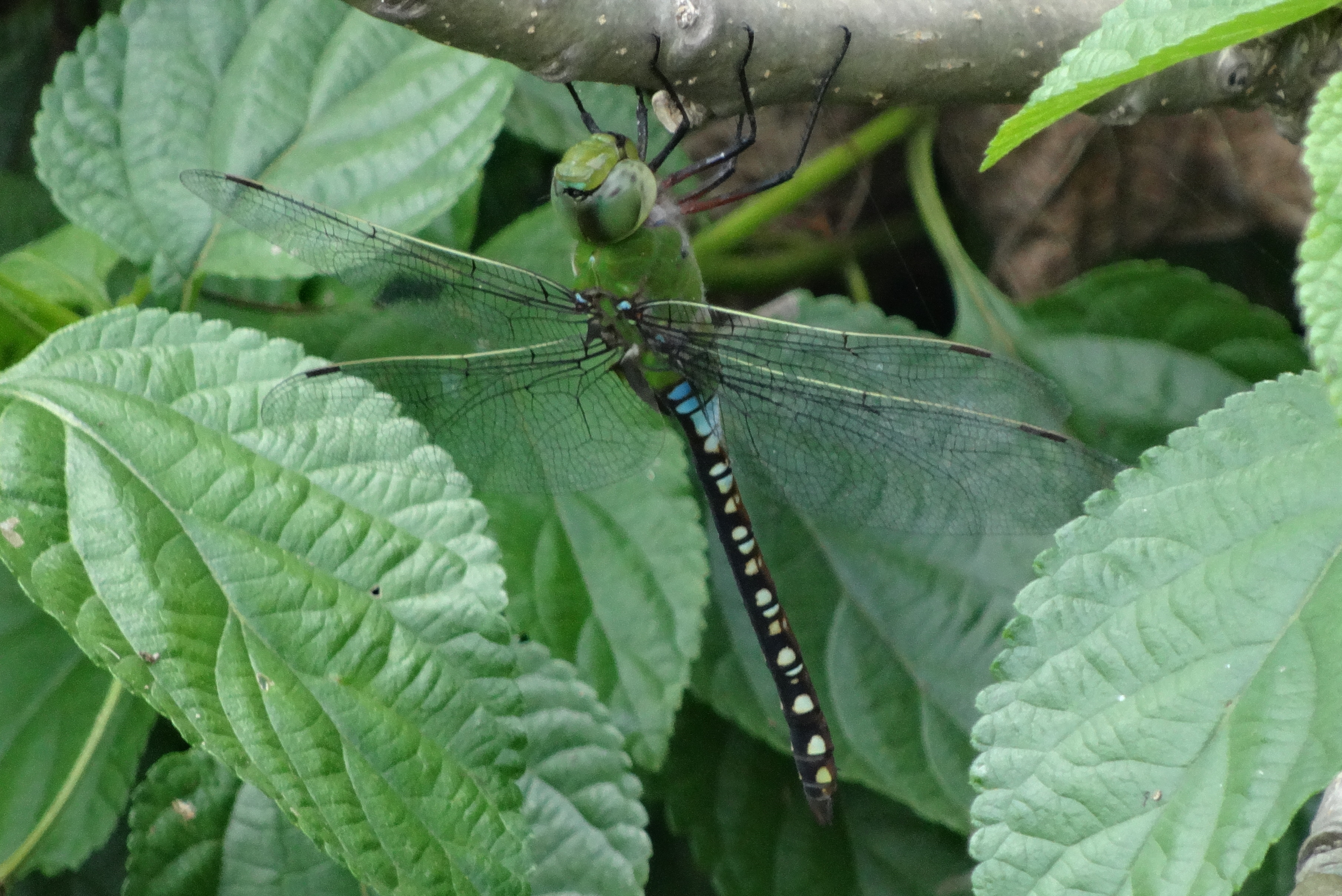
Anax guttatus male

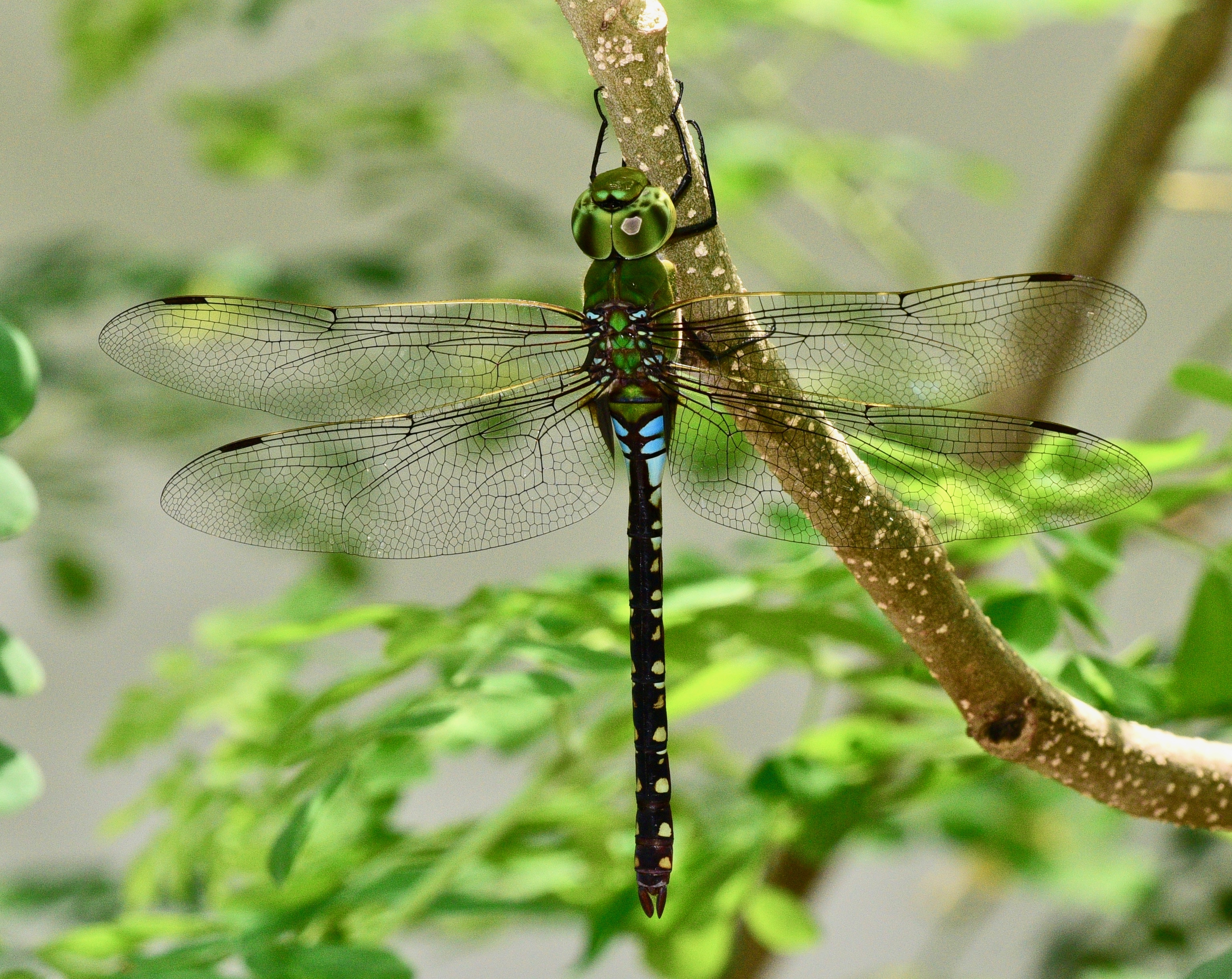
Anax guttatus female

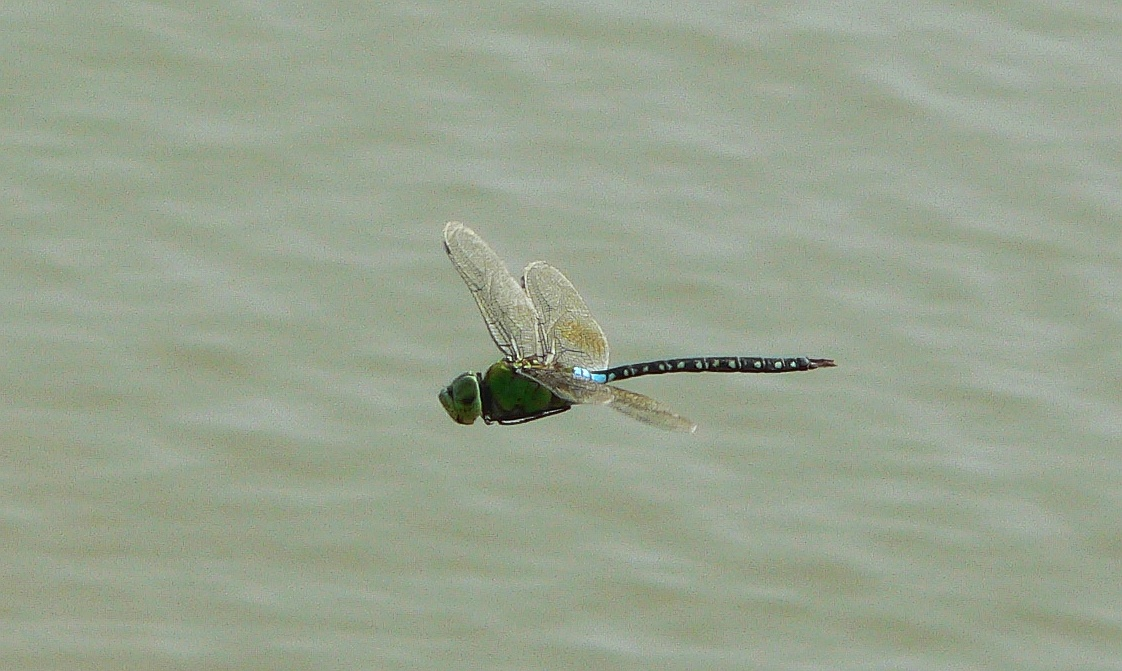
Anax guttatus male (in flight)

===== Species: Anax immaculifrons =====
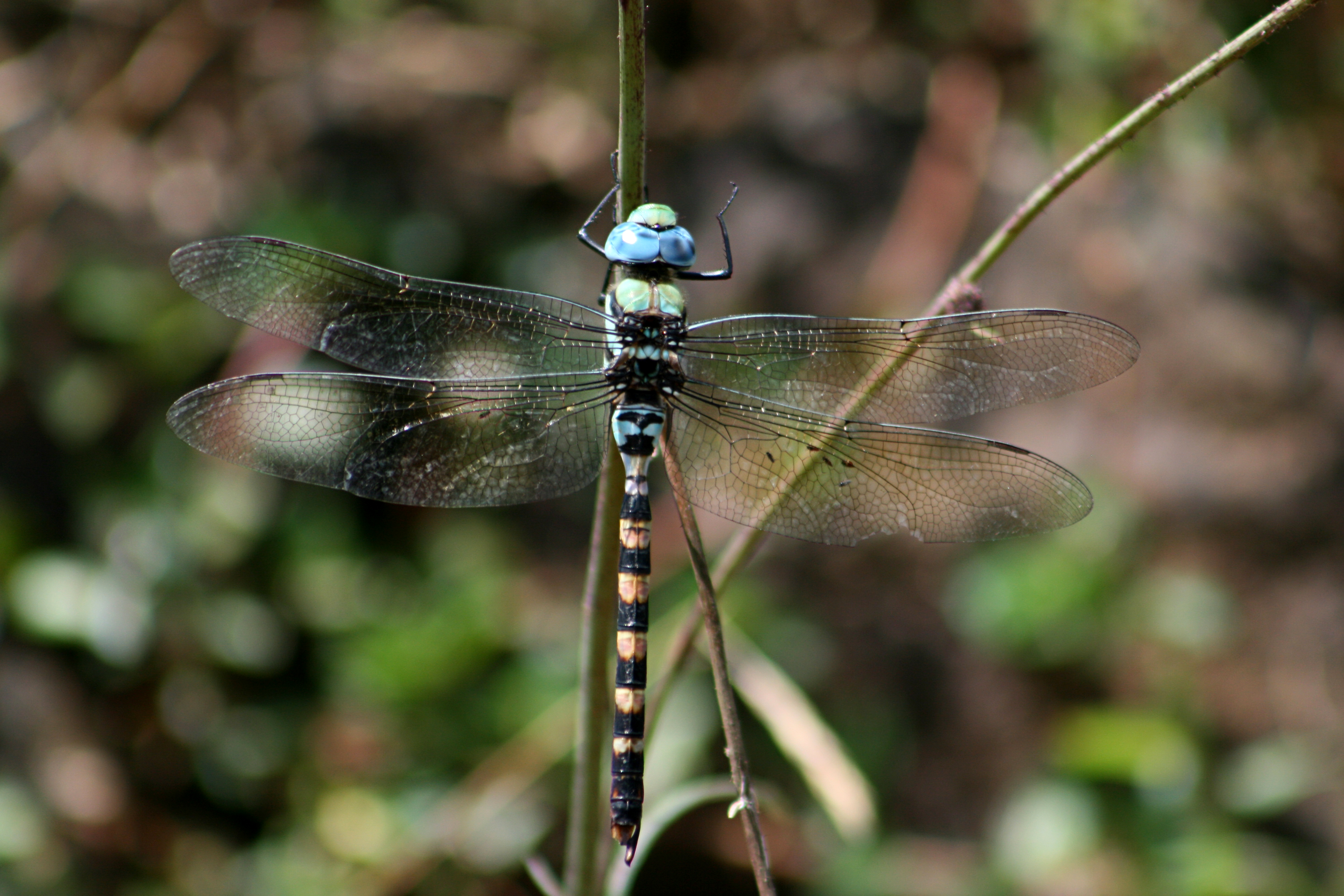
Anax immaculifrons male

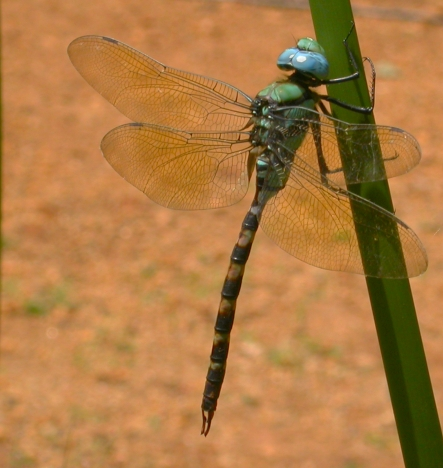
Anax immaculifrons male

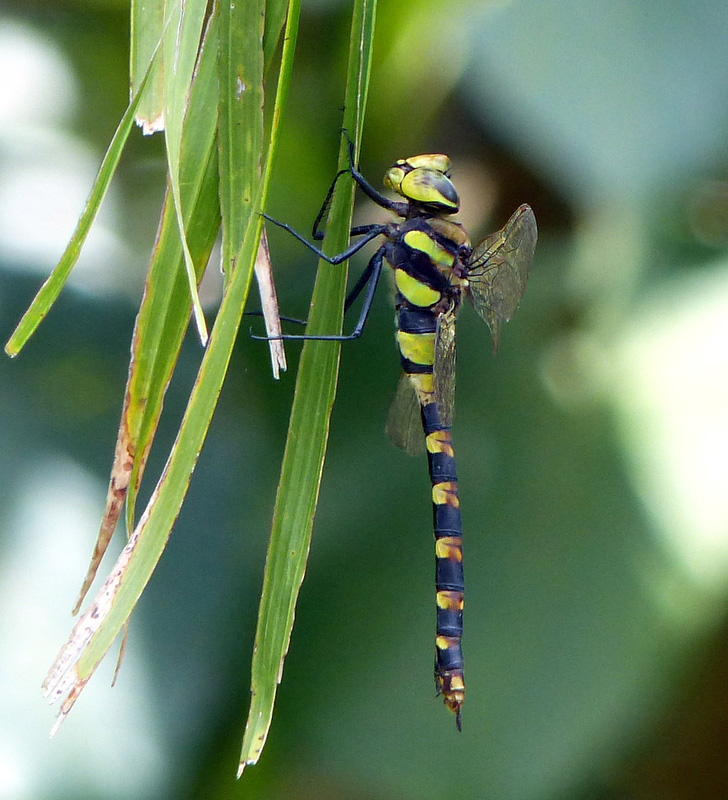
Anax immaculifrons female

===== Species: Anax indicus =====
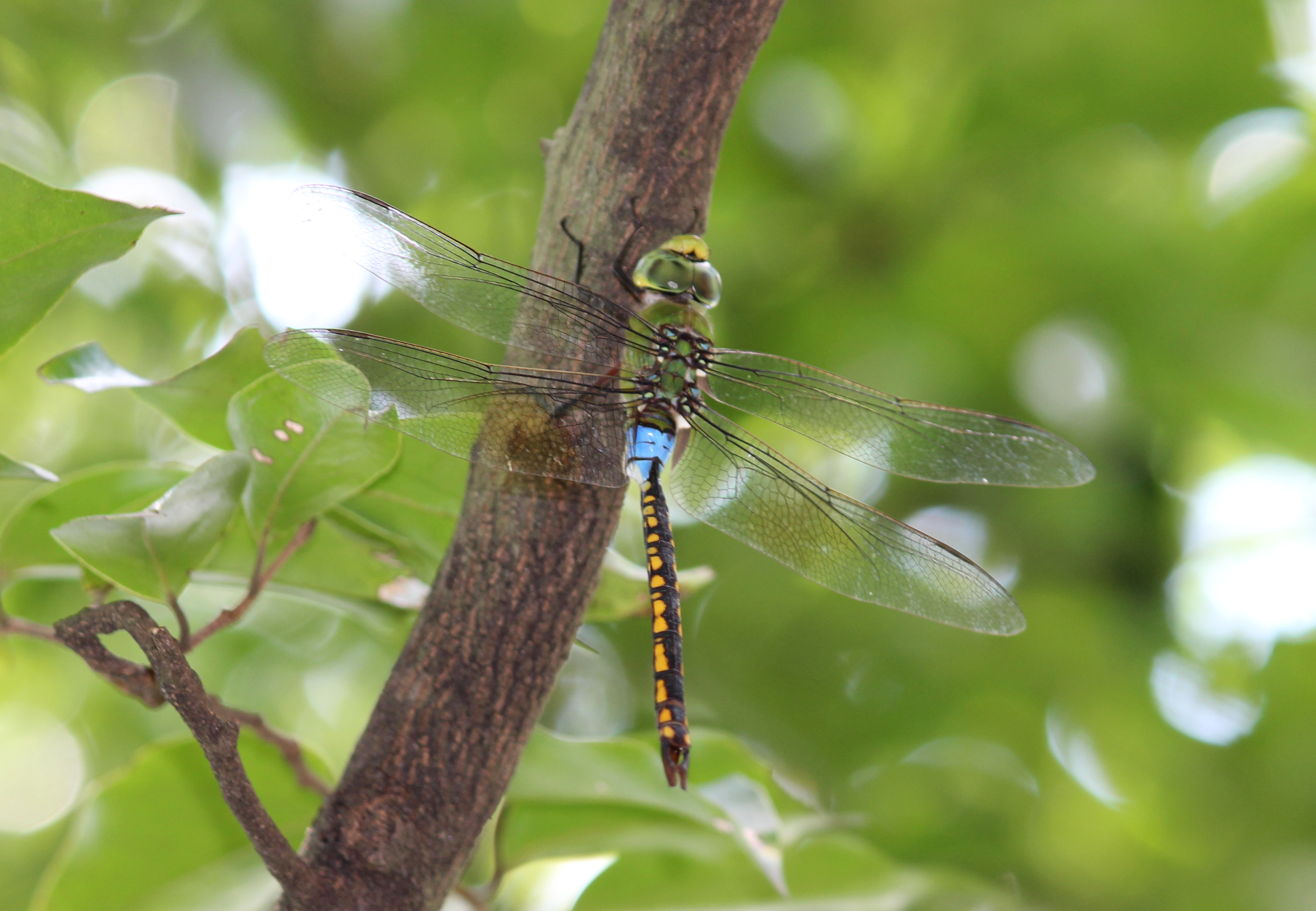
male

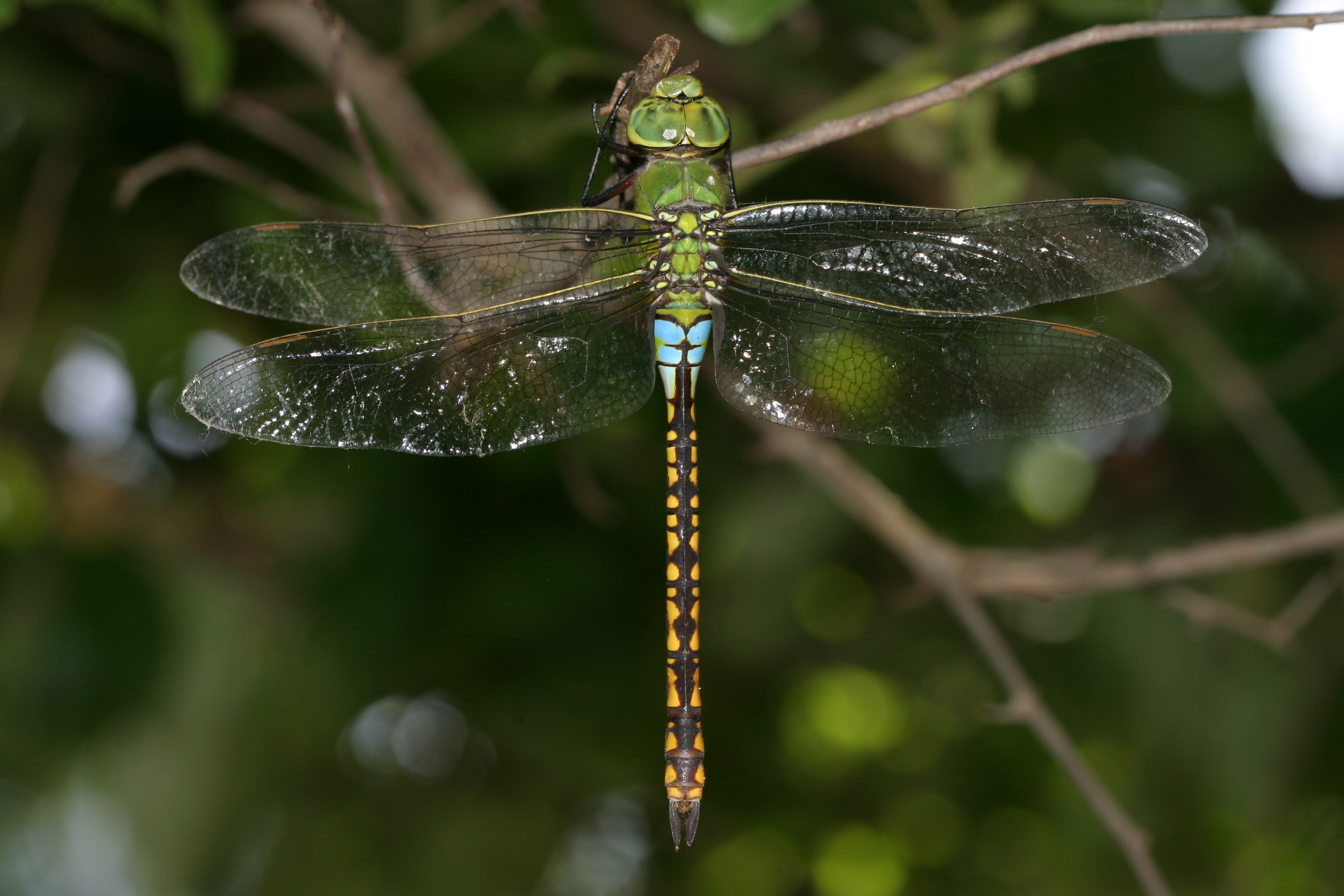
female

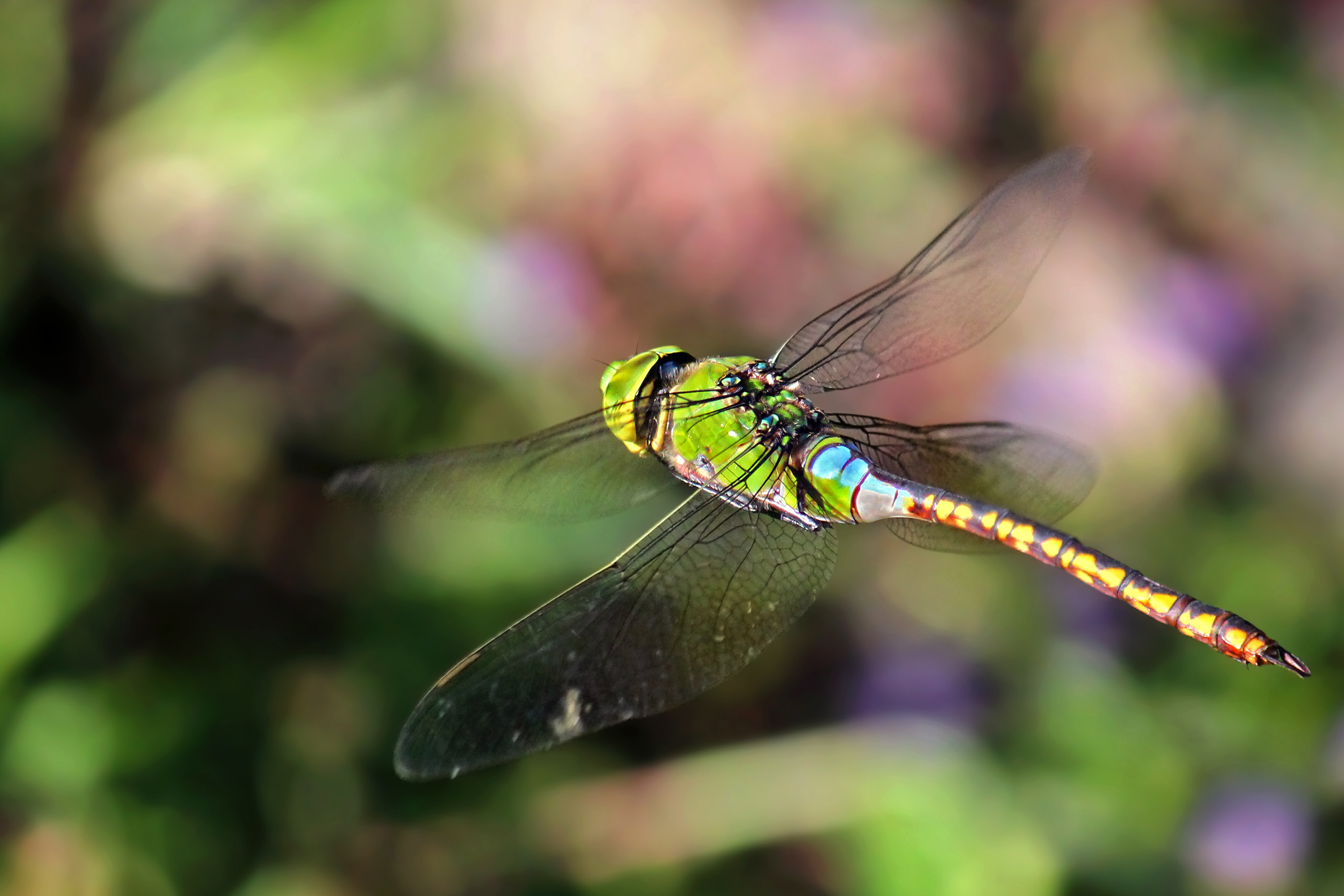
female

===== Species: Anax parthenope =====
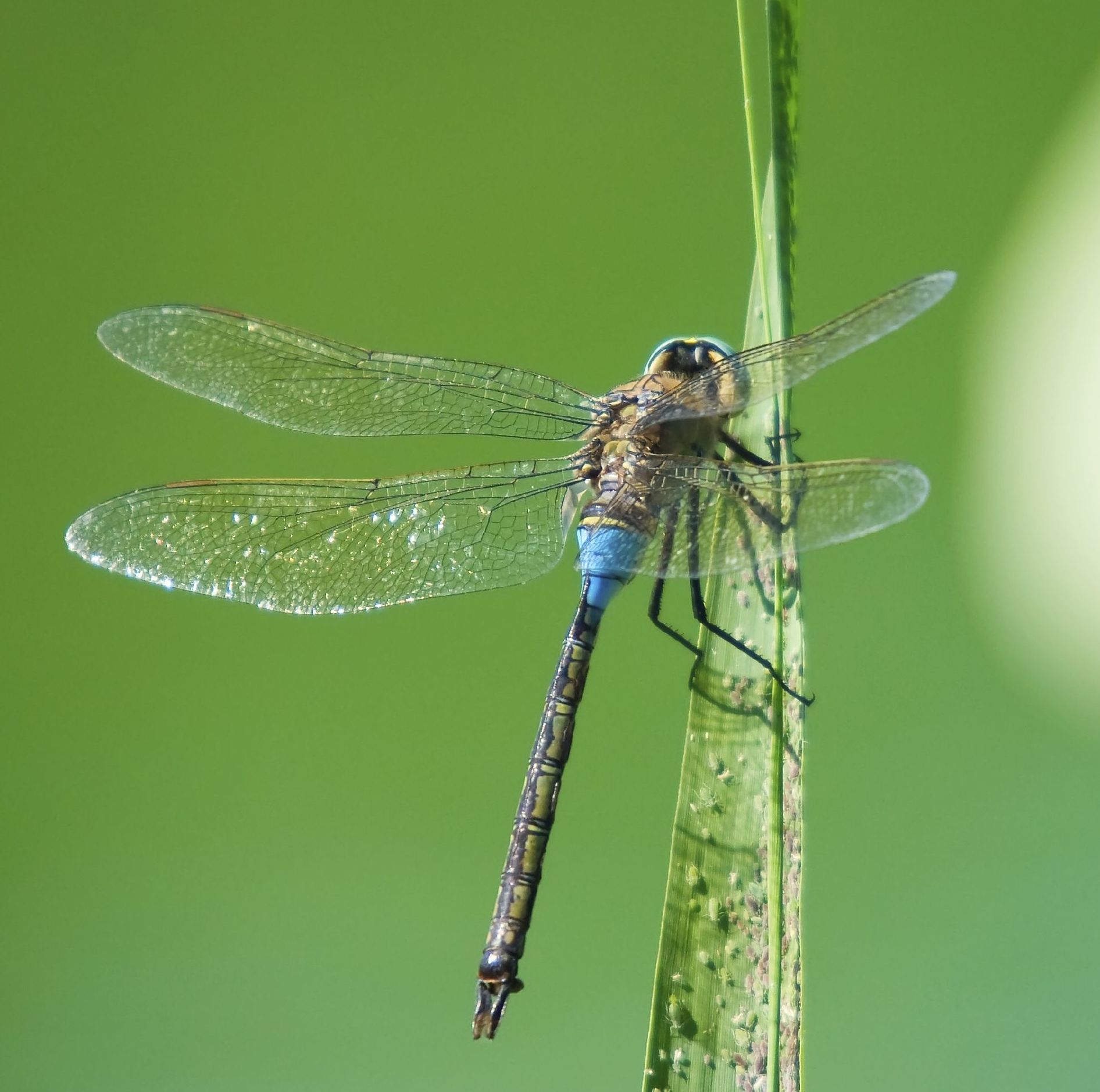
Anax parthenope male

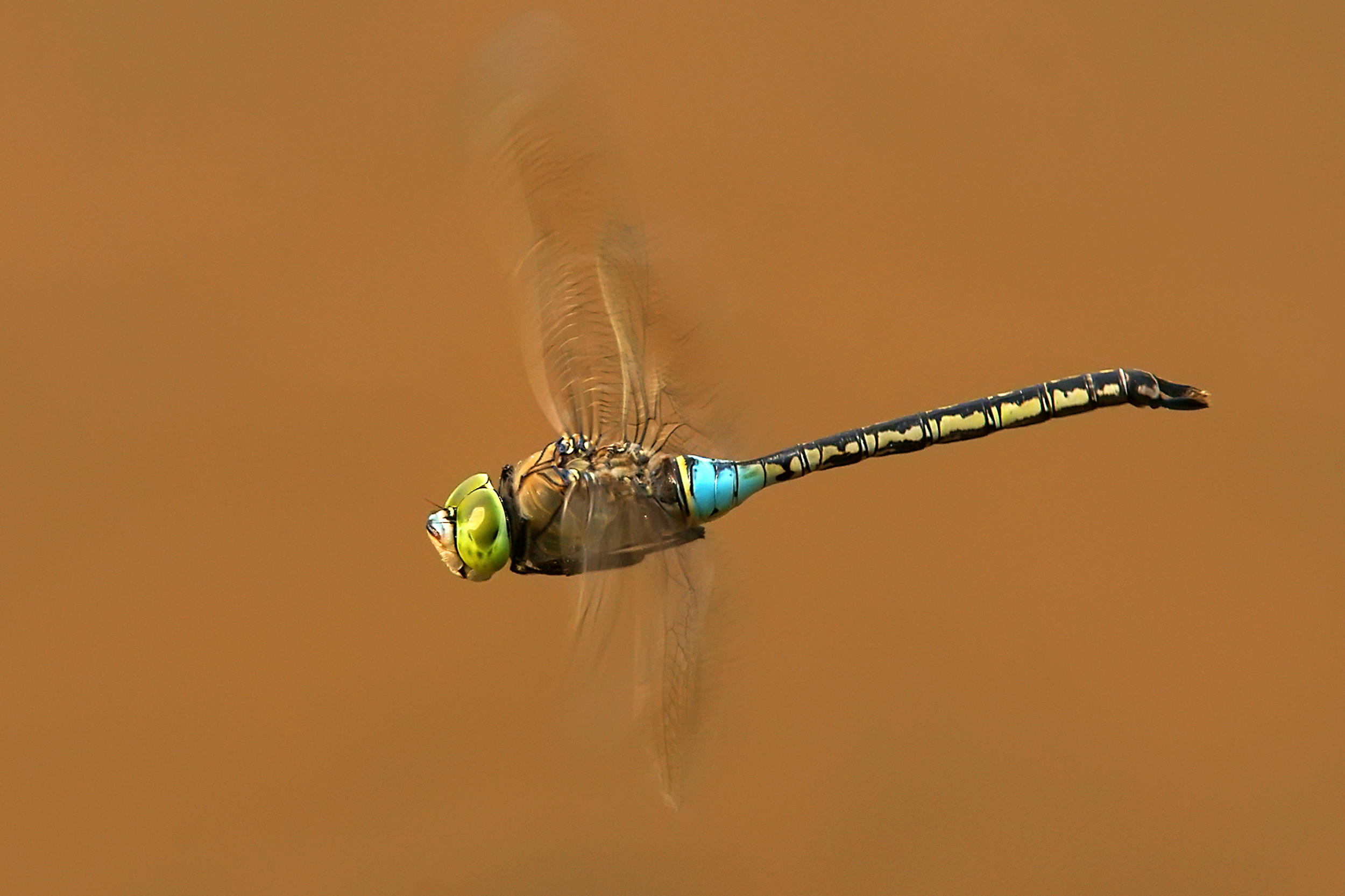
male

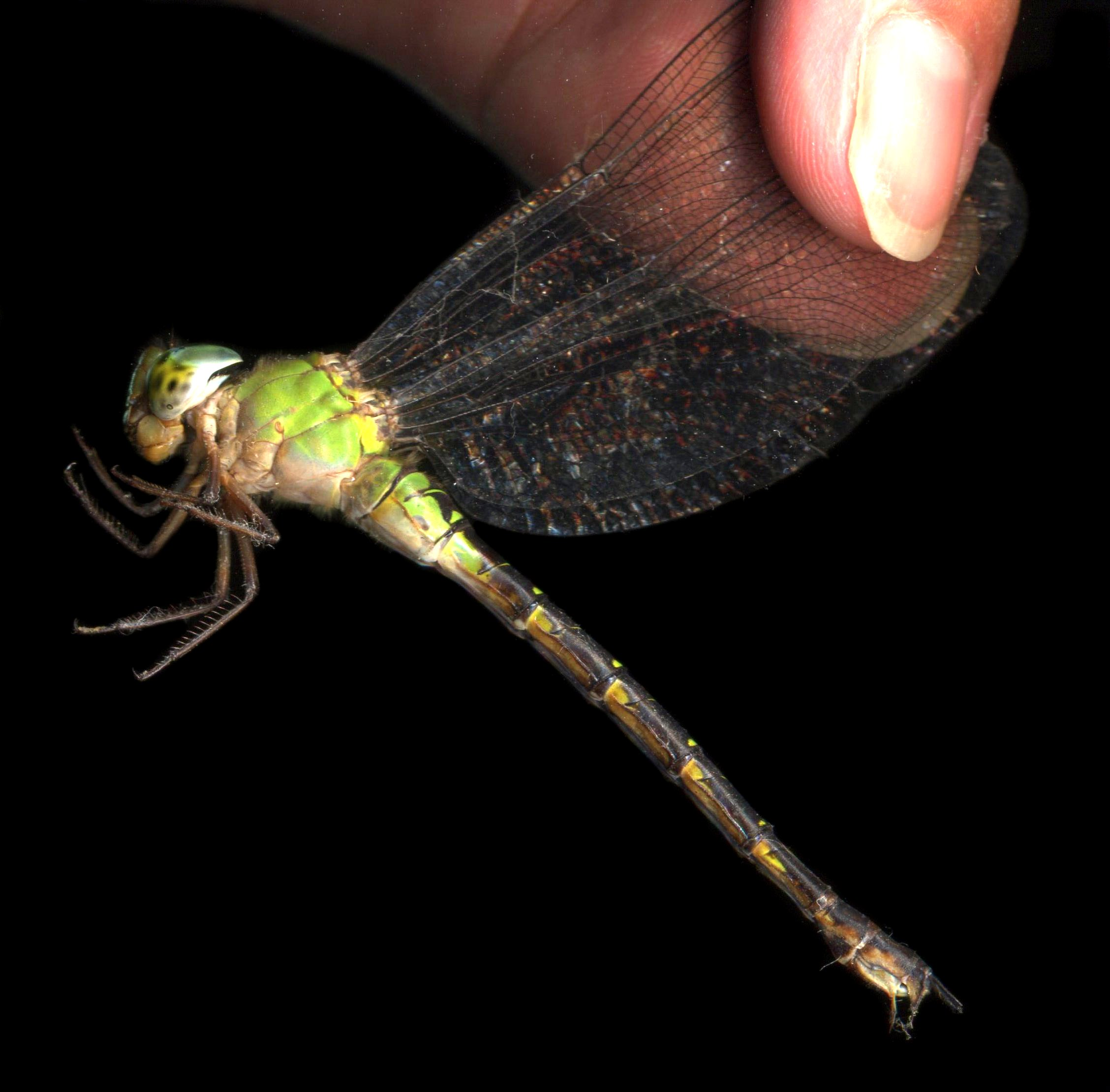
Anax parthenope female

==== Genus: Gynacantha ====
===== Species: Gynacantha dravida =====
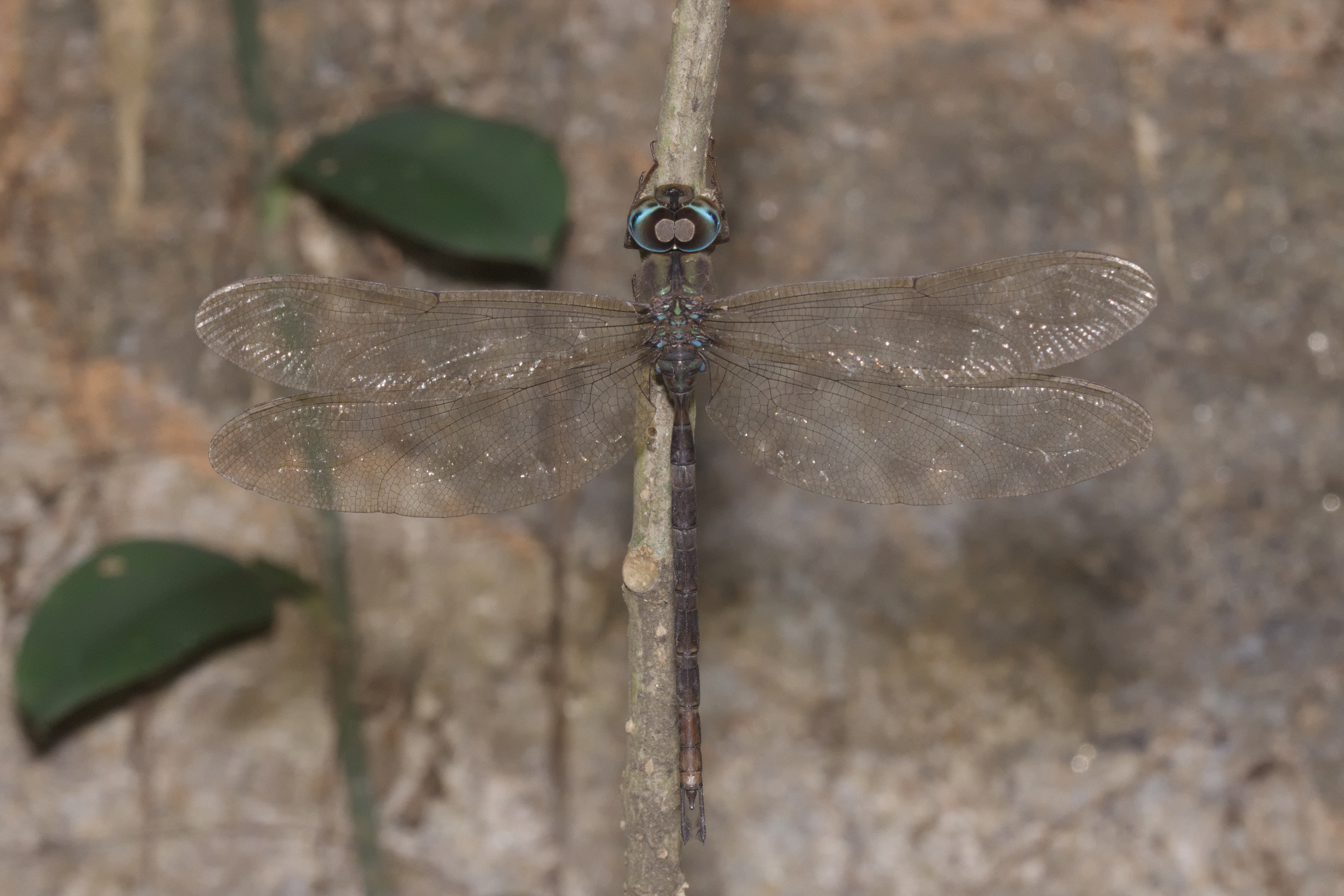
Gynacantha dravida male

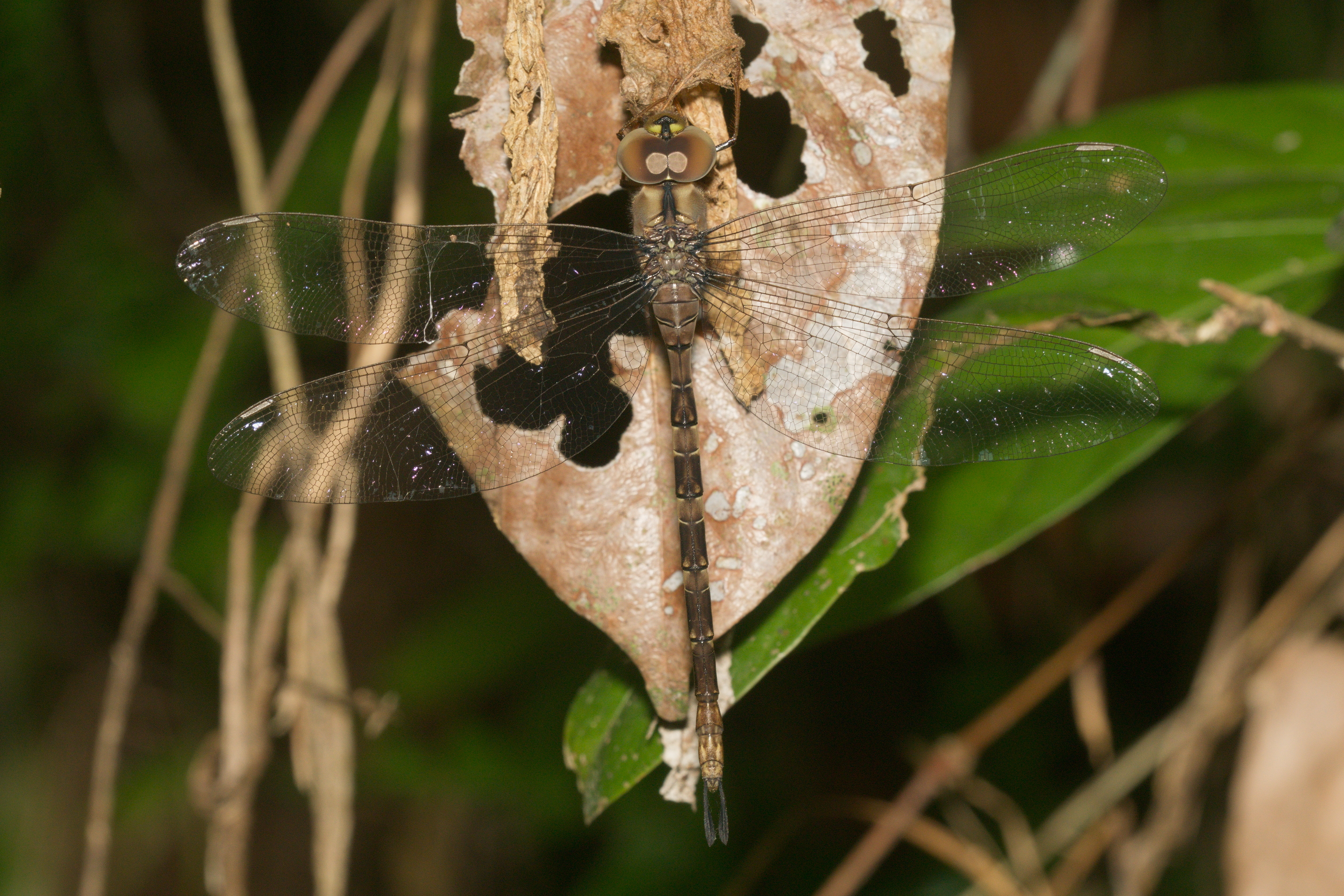
Gynacantha dravida female

===== Species: Gynacantha millardi =====
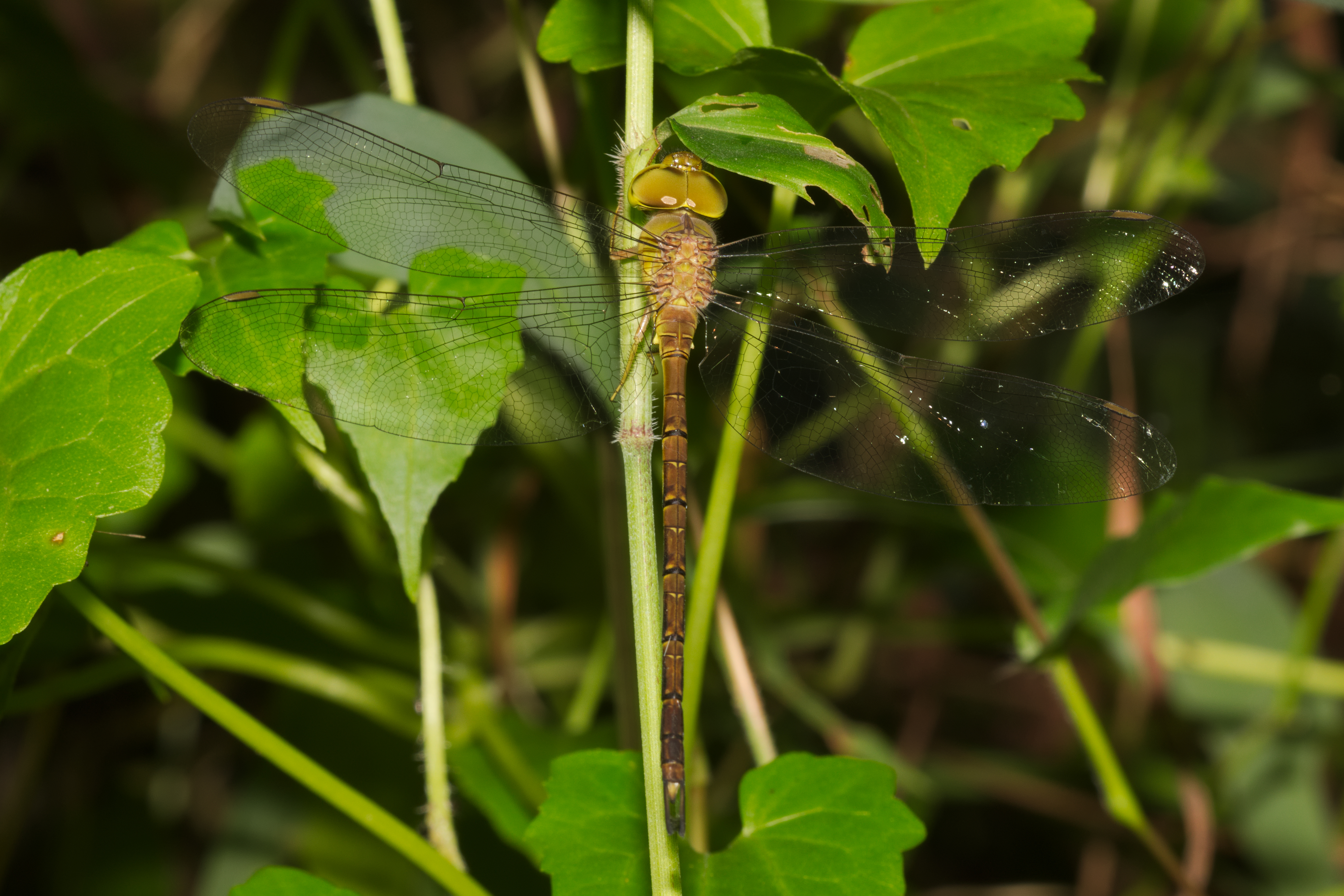
Gynacantha millardi male

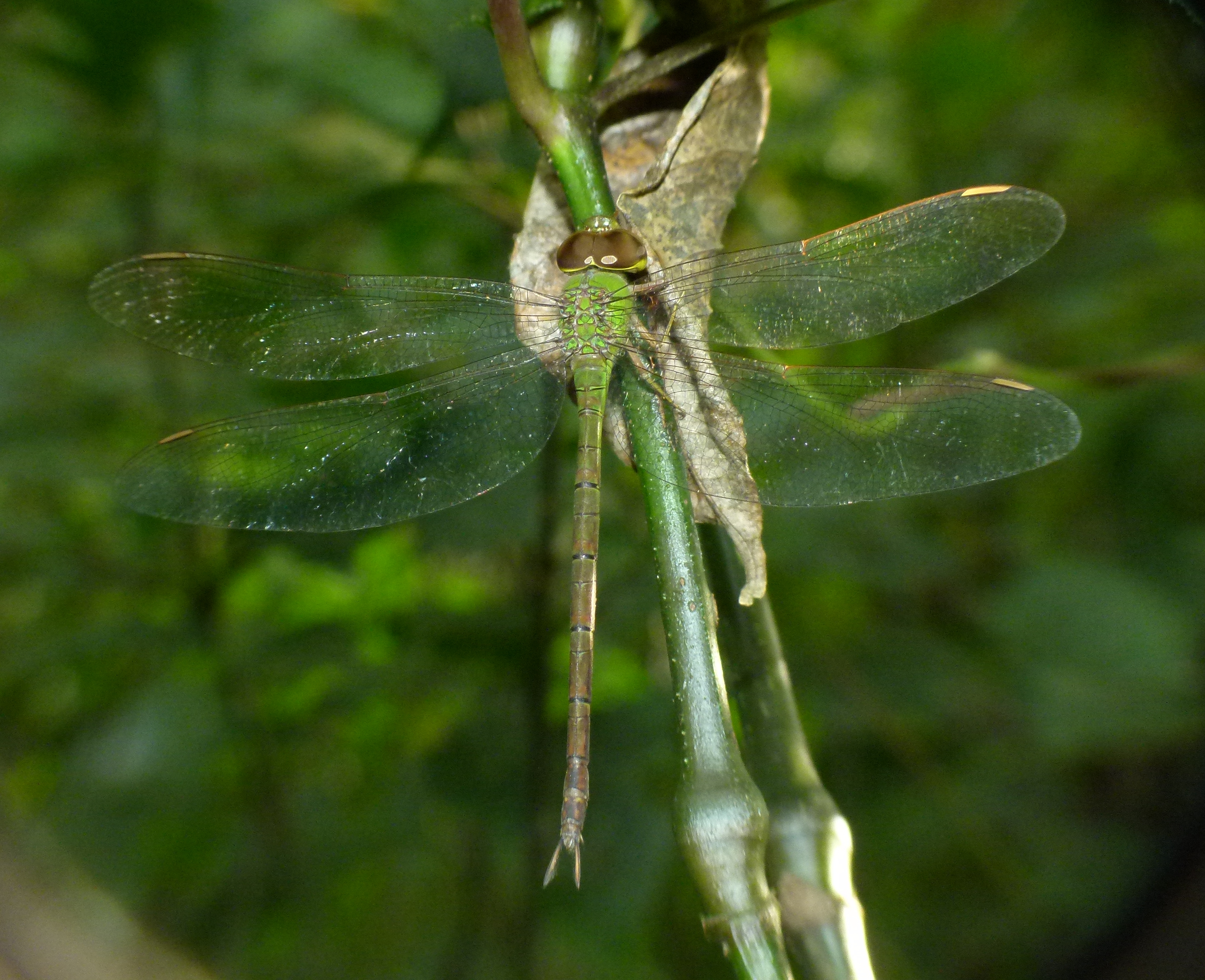
Gynacantha millardi female

=== Family: Gomphidae (Clubtails) ===
==== Genus: Acrogomphus ====
===== Species: Acrogomphus fraseri =====
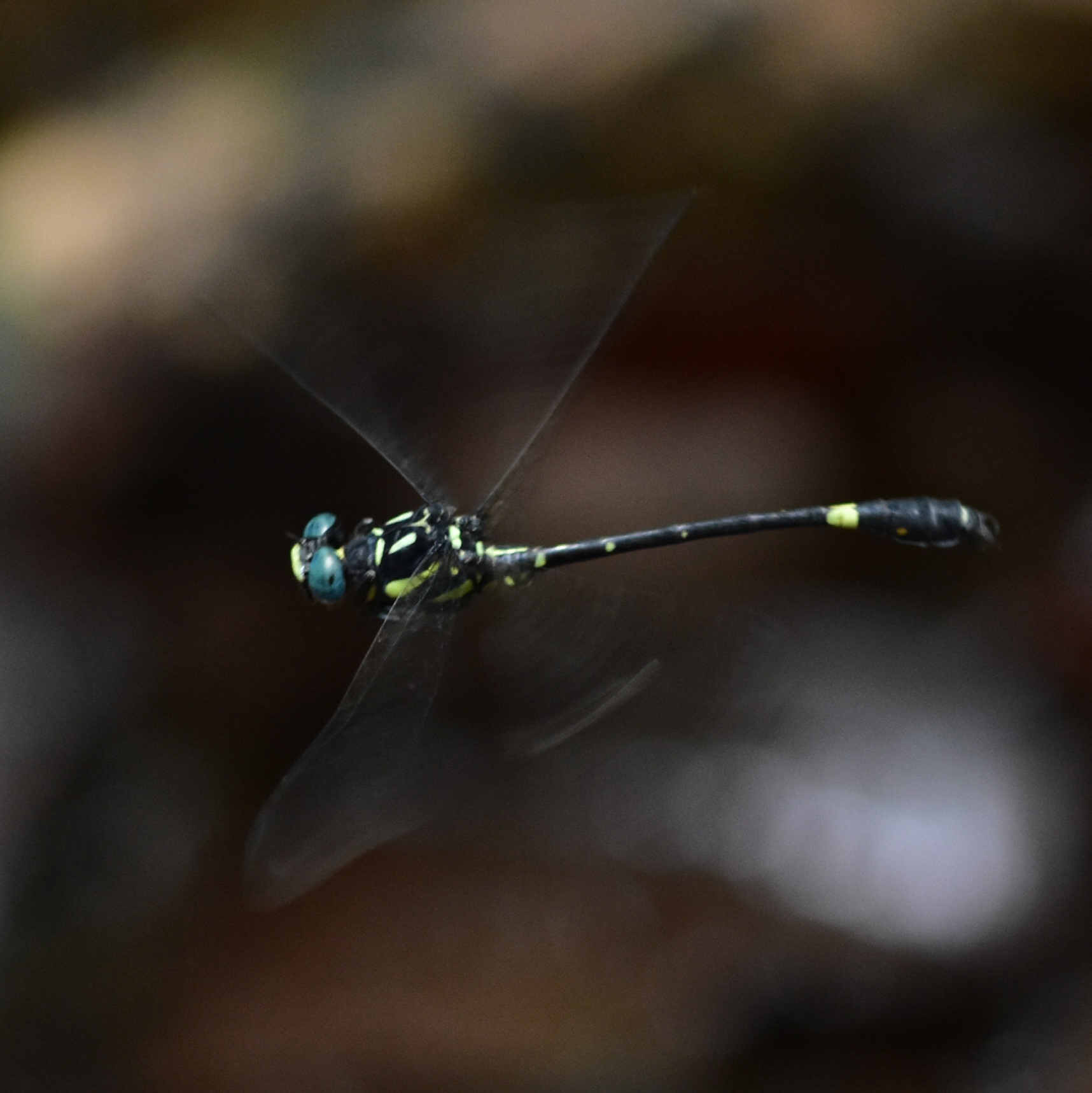
male in flight

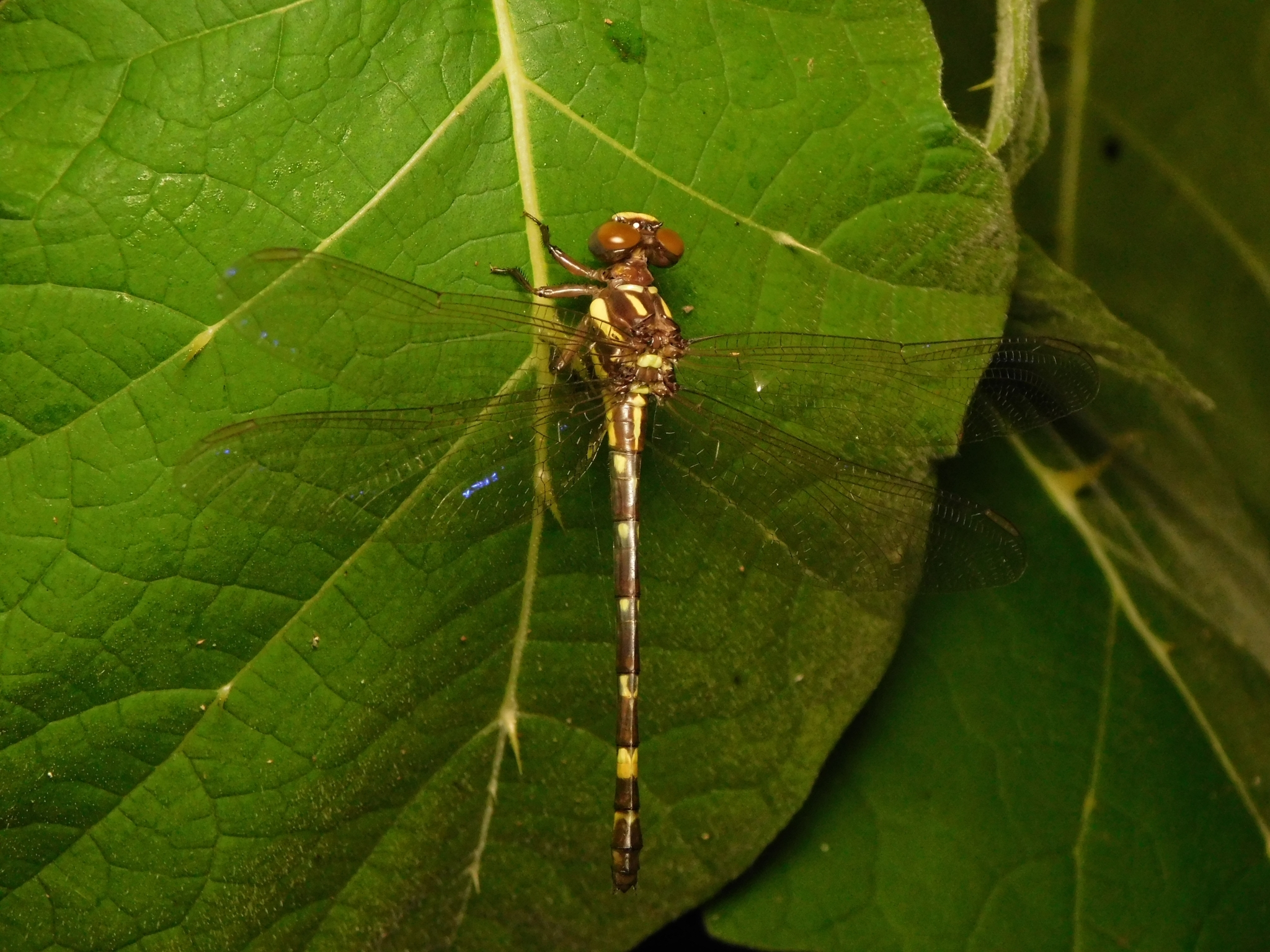
teneral female

==== Genus: Asiagomphus ====
===== Species: Asiagomphus nilgiricus =====
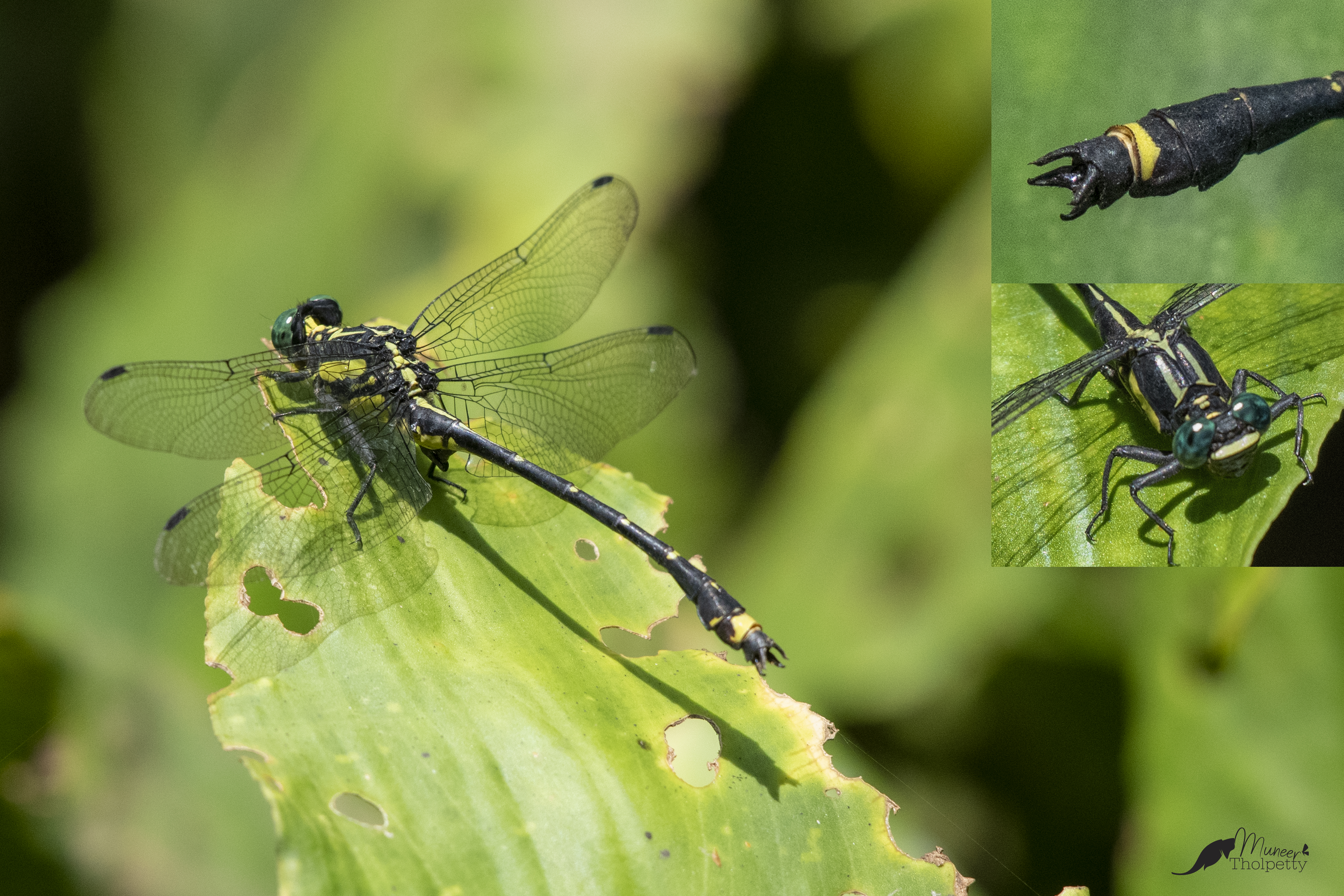
male

==== Genus: Burmagomphus ====
===== Species: Burmagomphus cauvericus =====
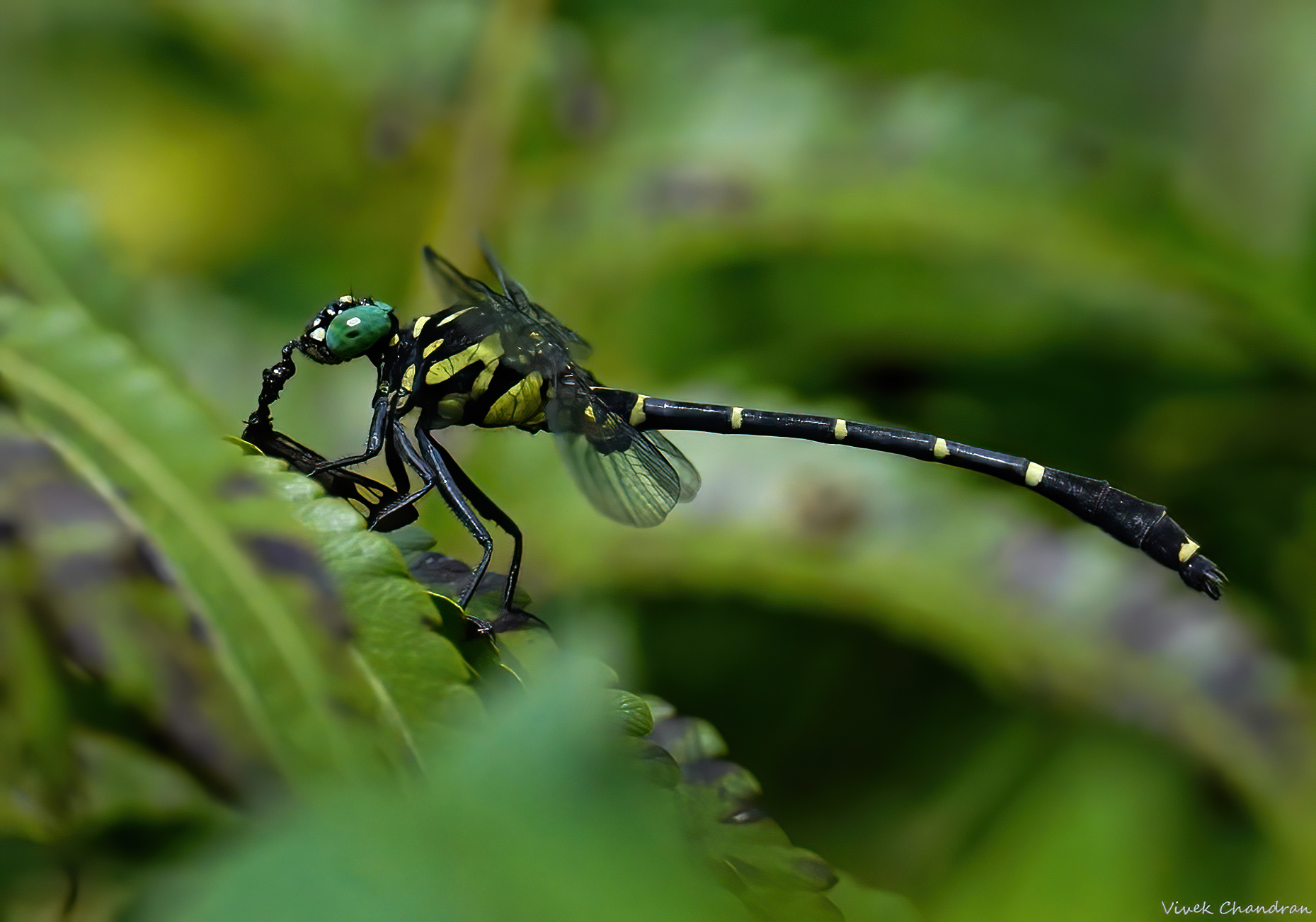
male

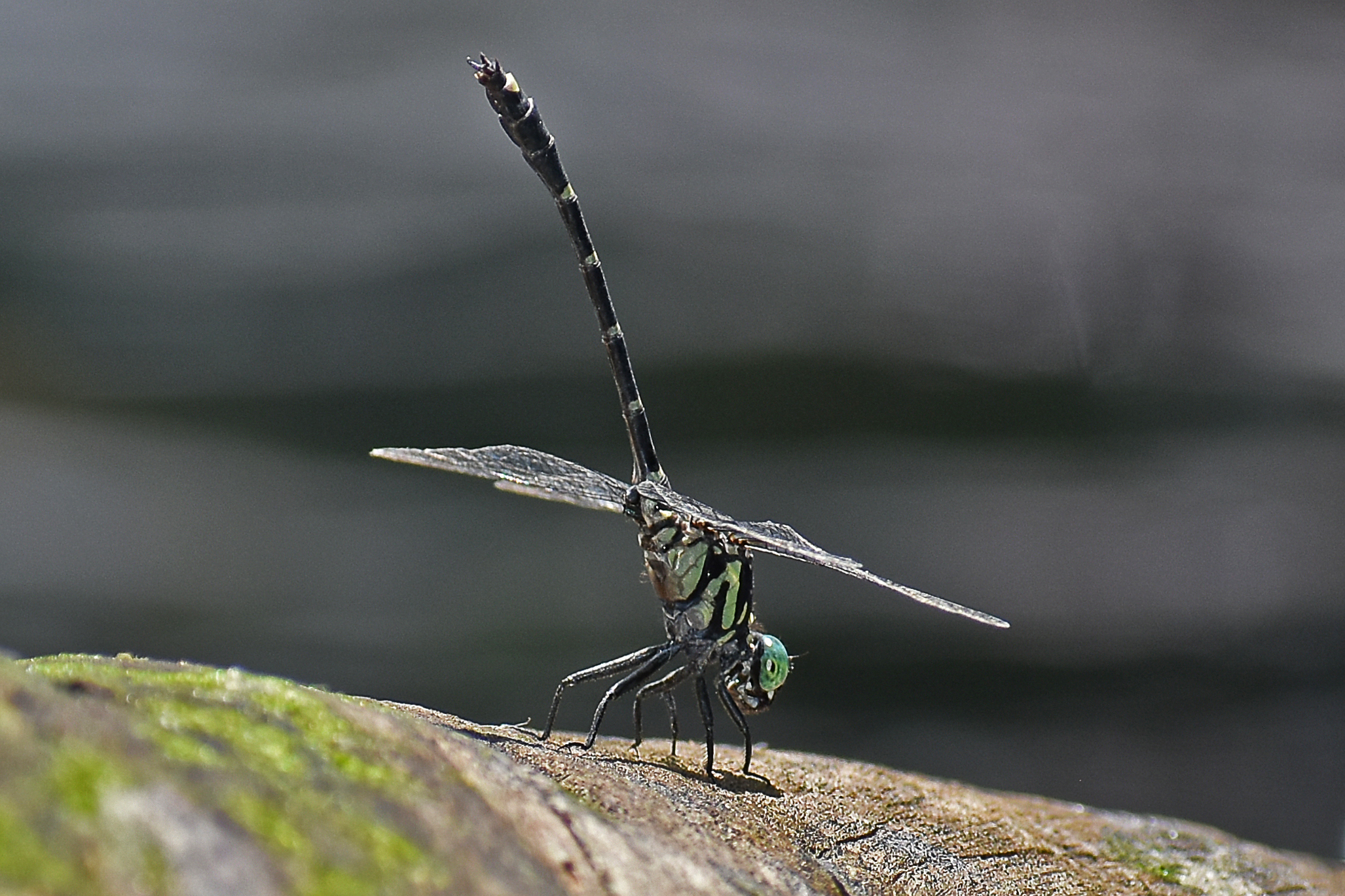
male

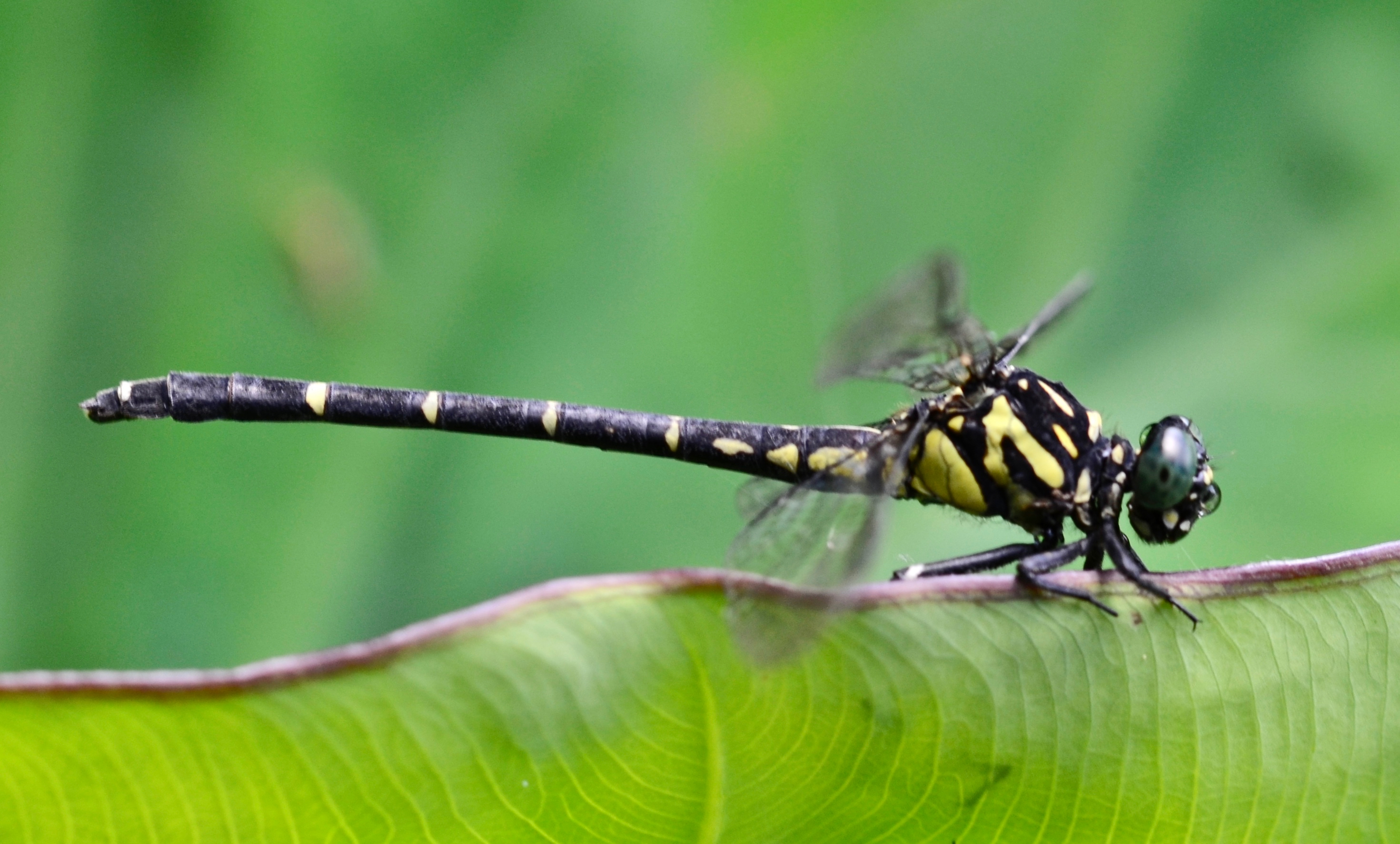
female

===== Species: Burmagomphus chaukulensis =====
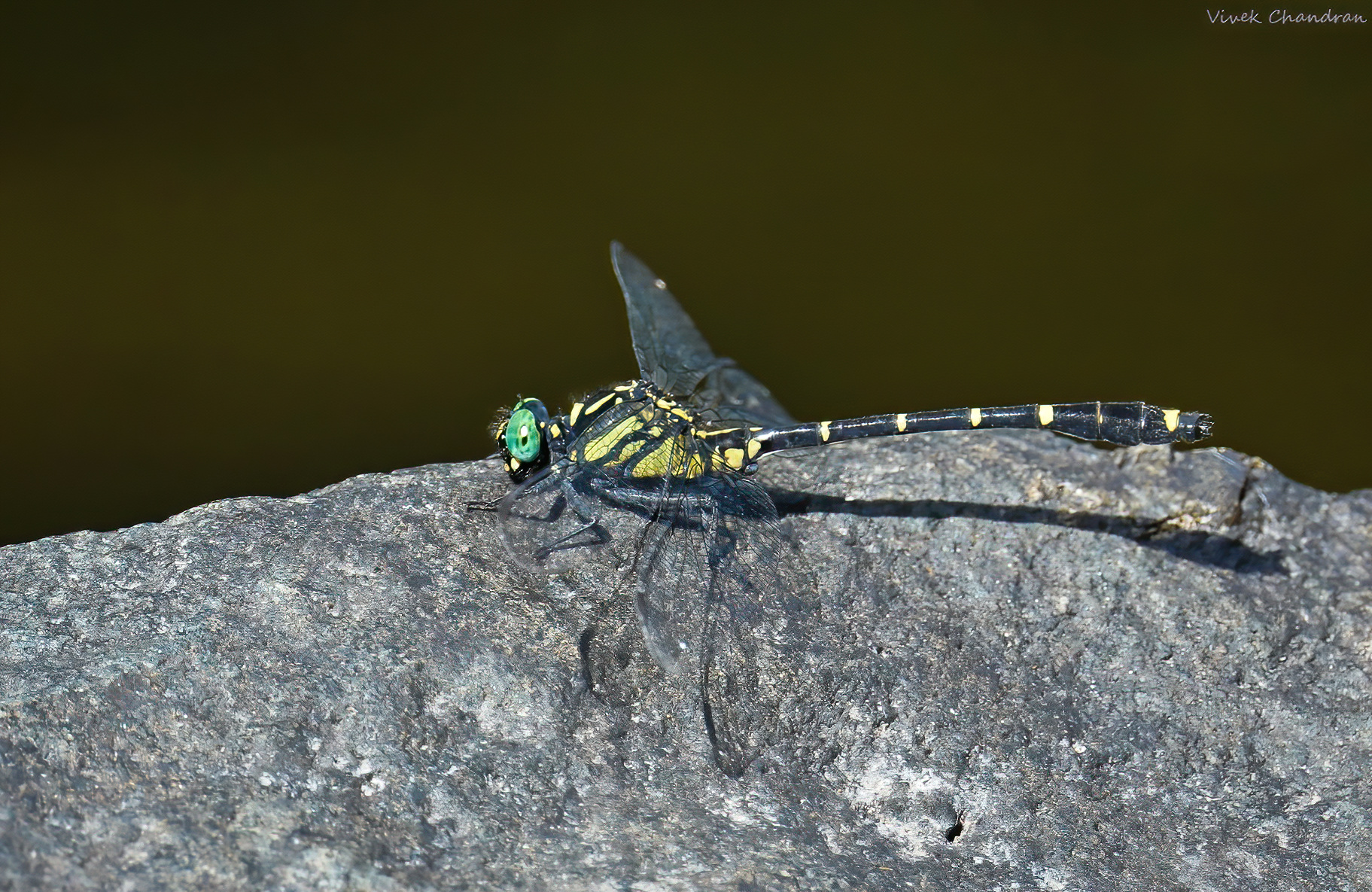
male

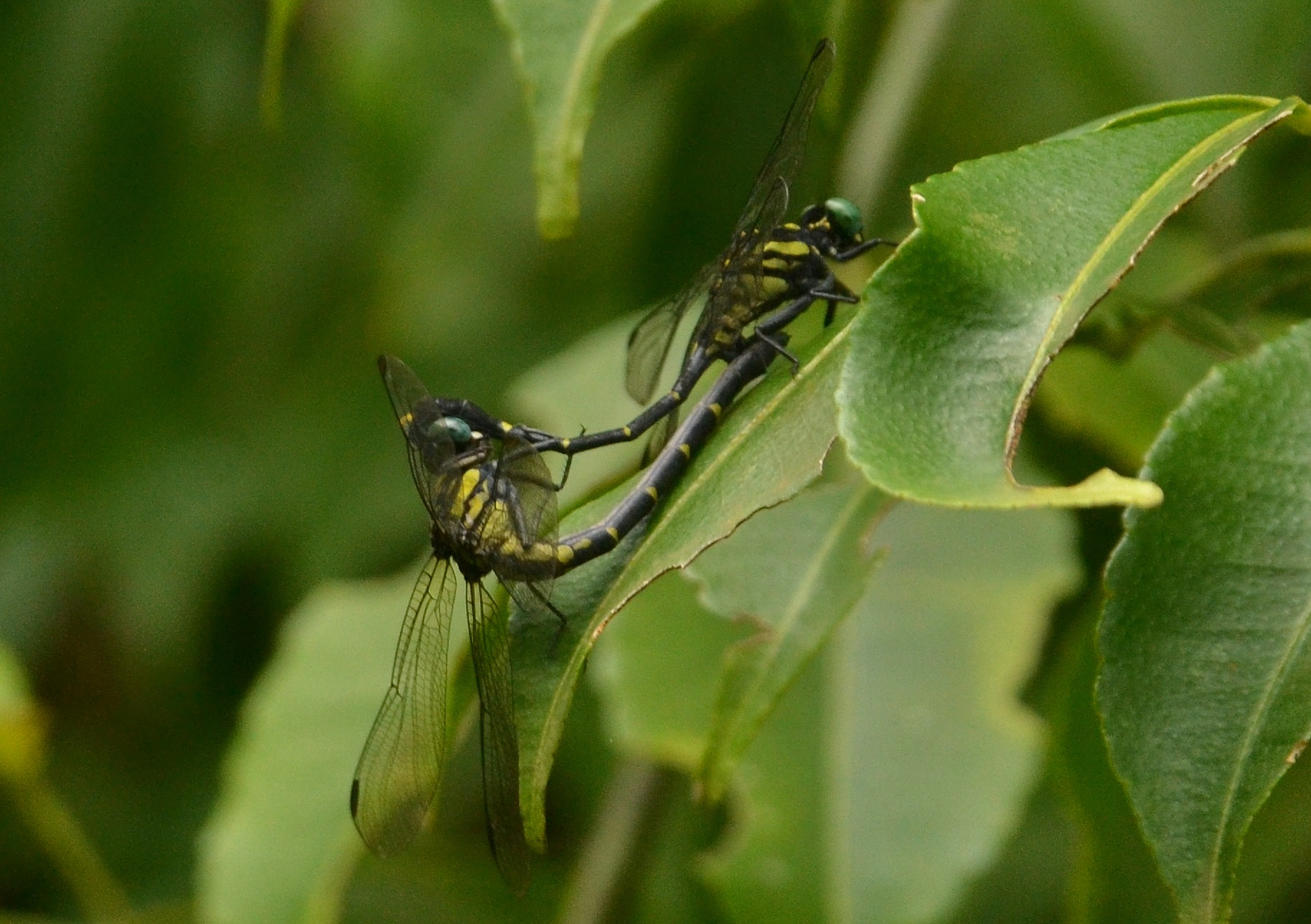
mating pair

===== Species: Burmagomphus laidlawi =====
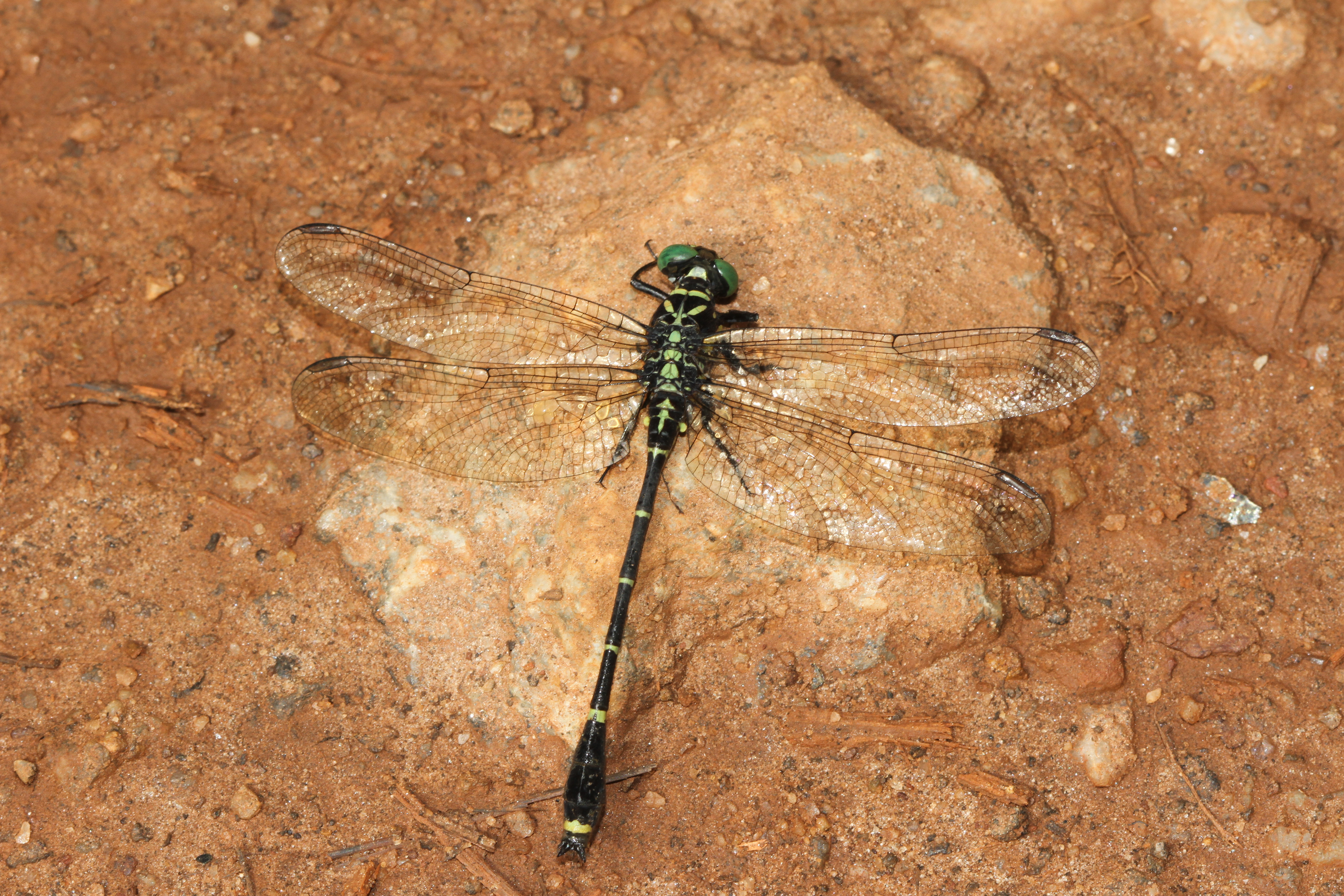
Burmagomphus laidlawi male

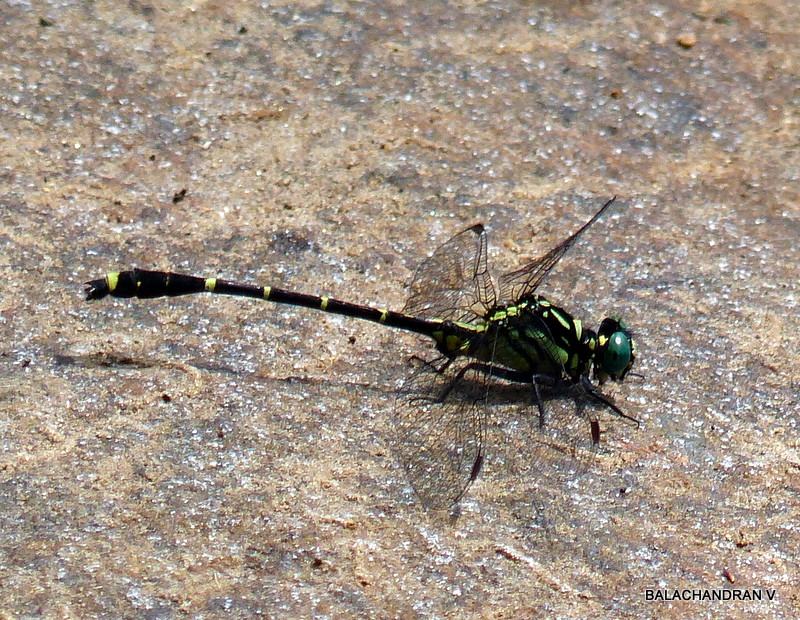
male

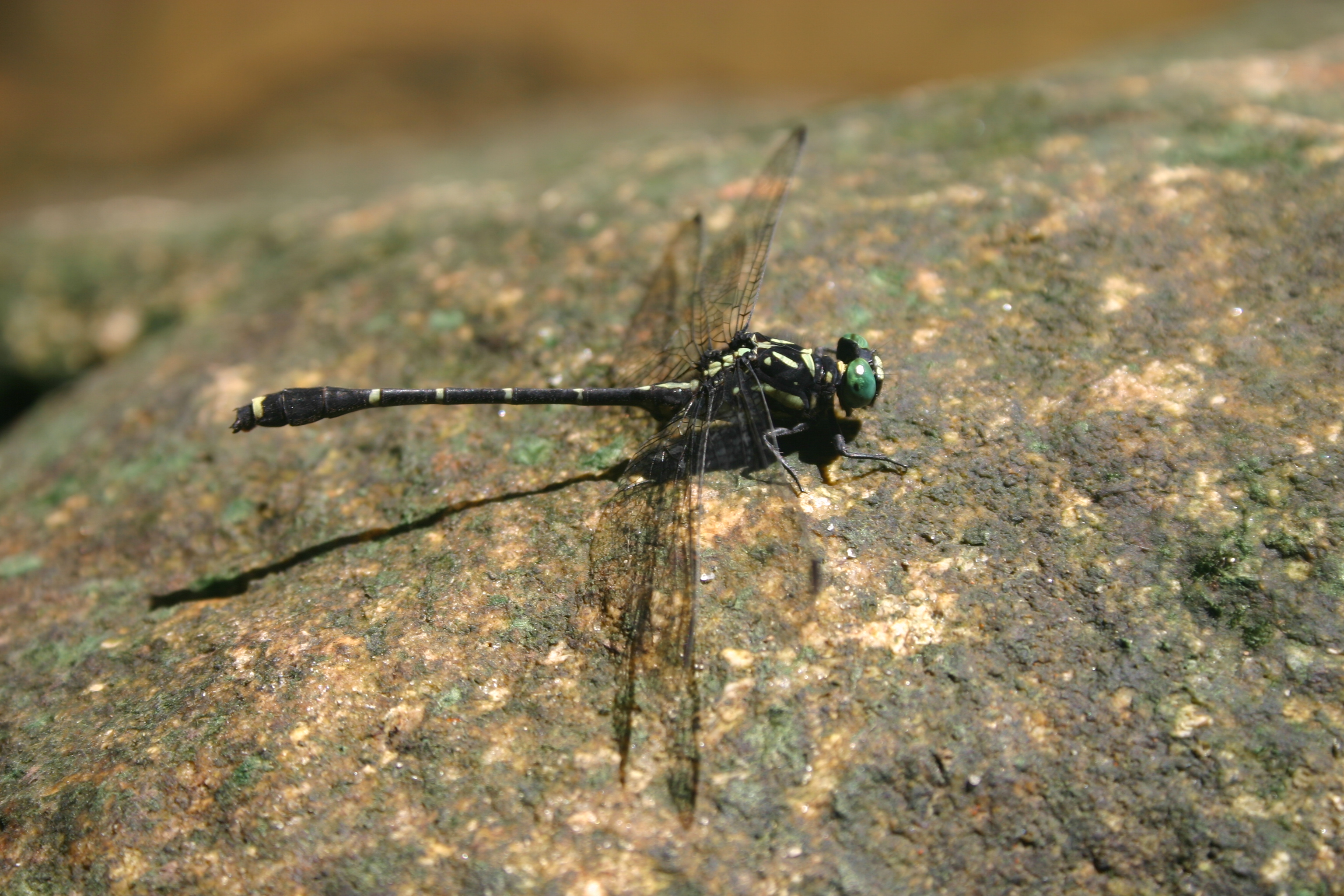
male

==== Genus: Cyclogomphus ====
===== Species: Cyclogomphus flavoannulatus =====
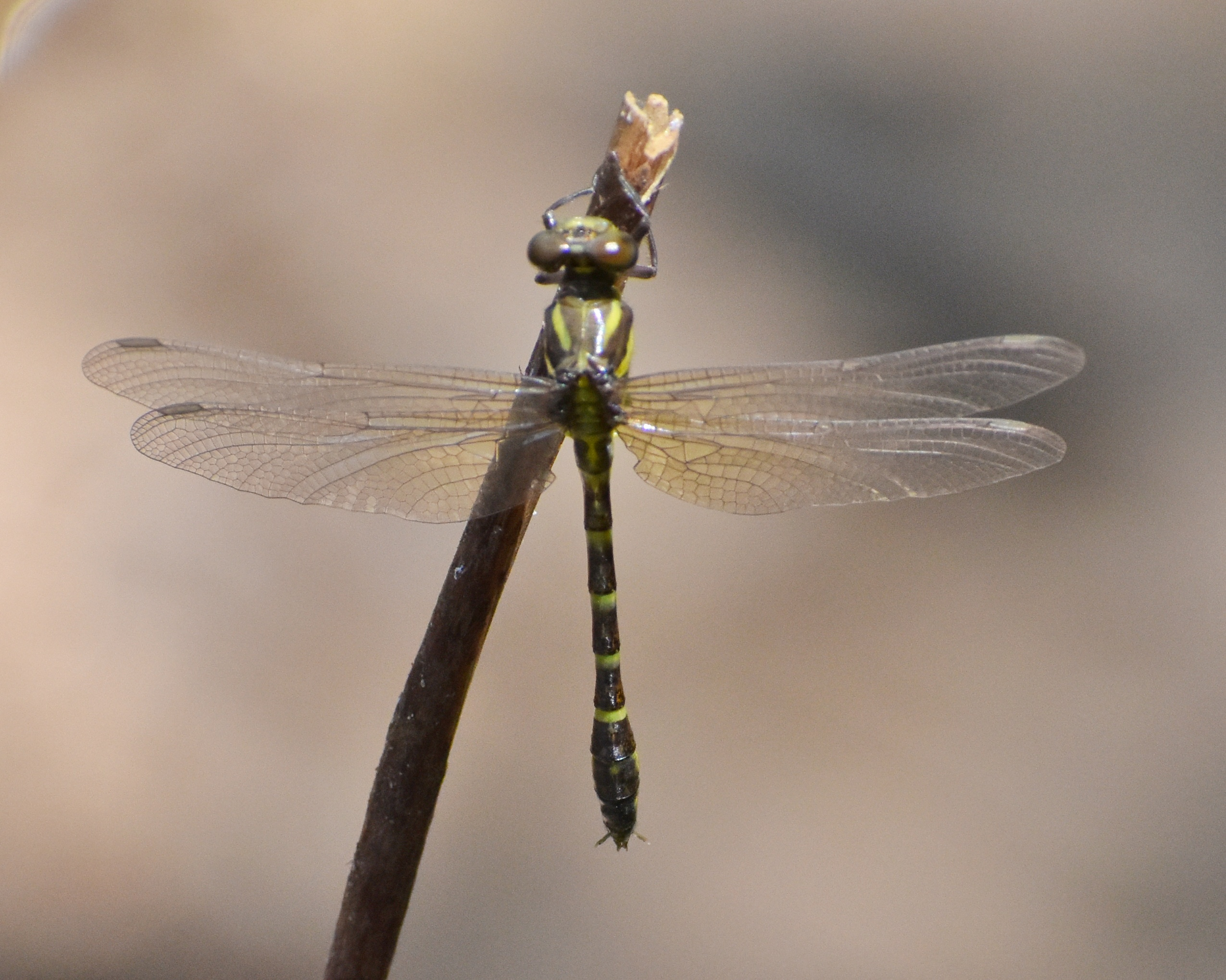
male

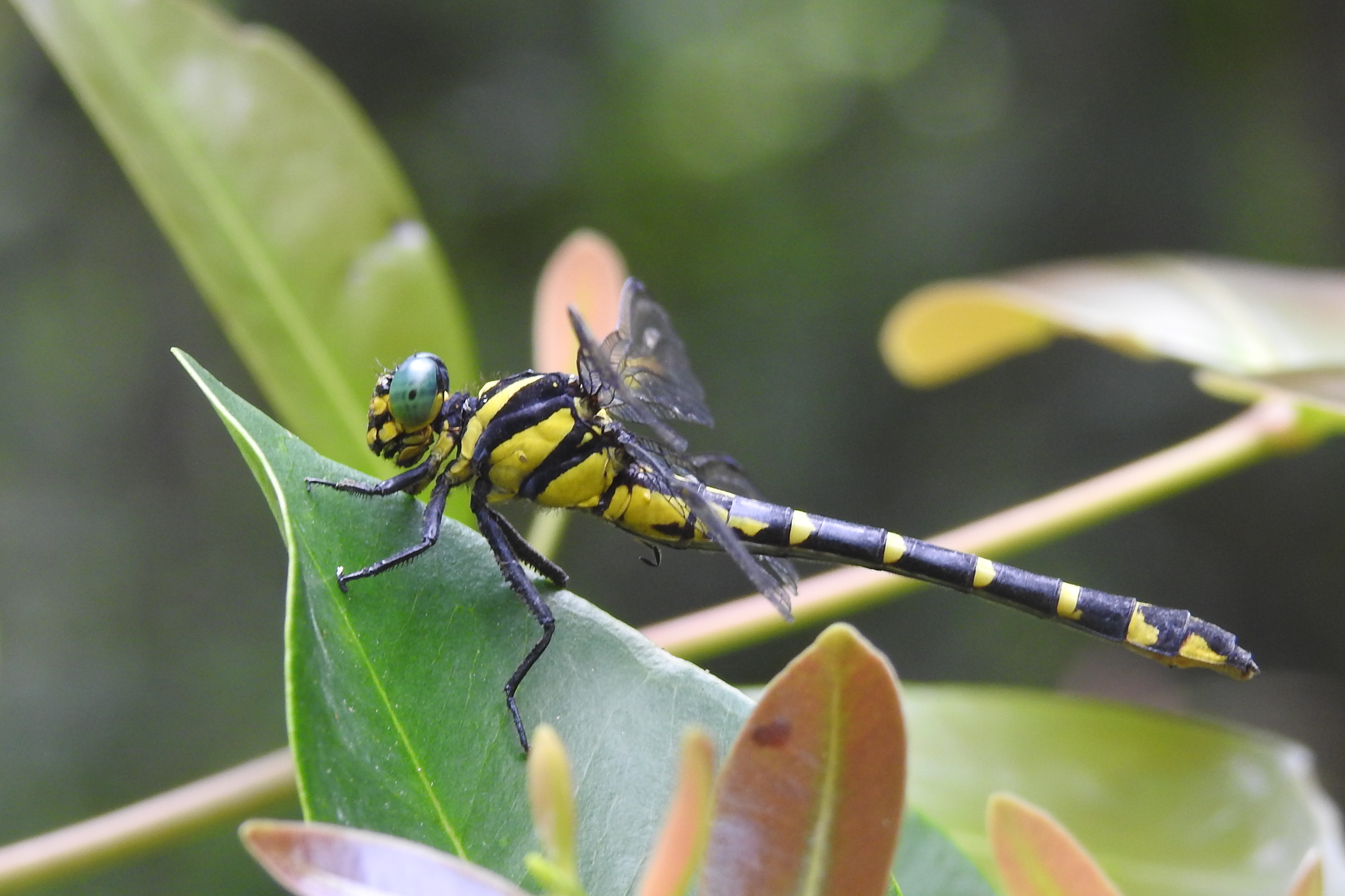
female

===== Species: Cyclogomphus heterostylus =====
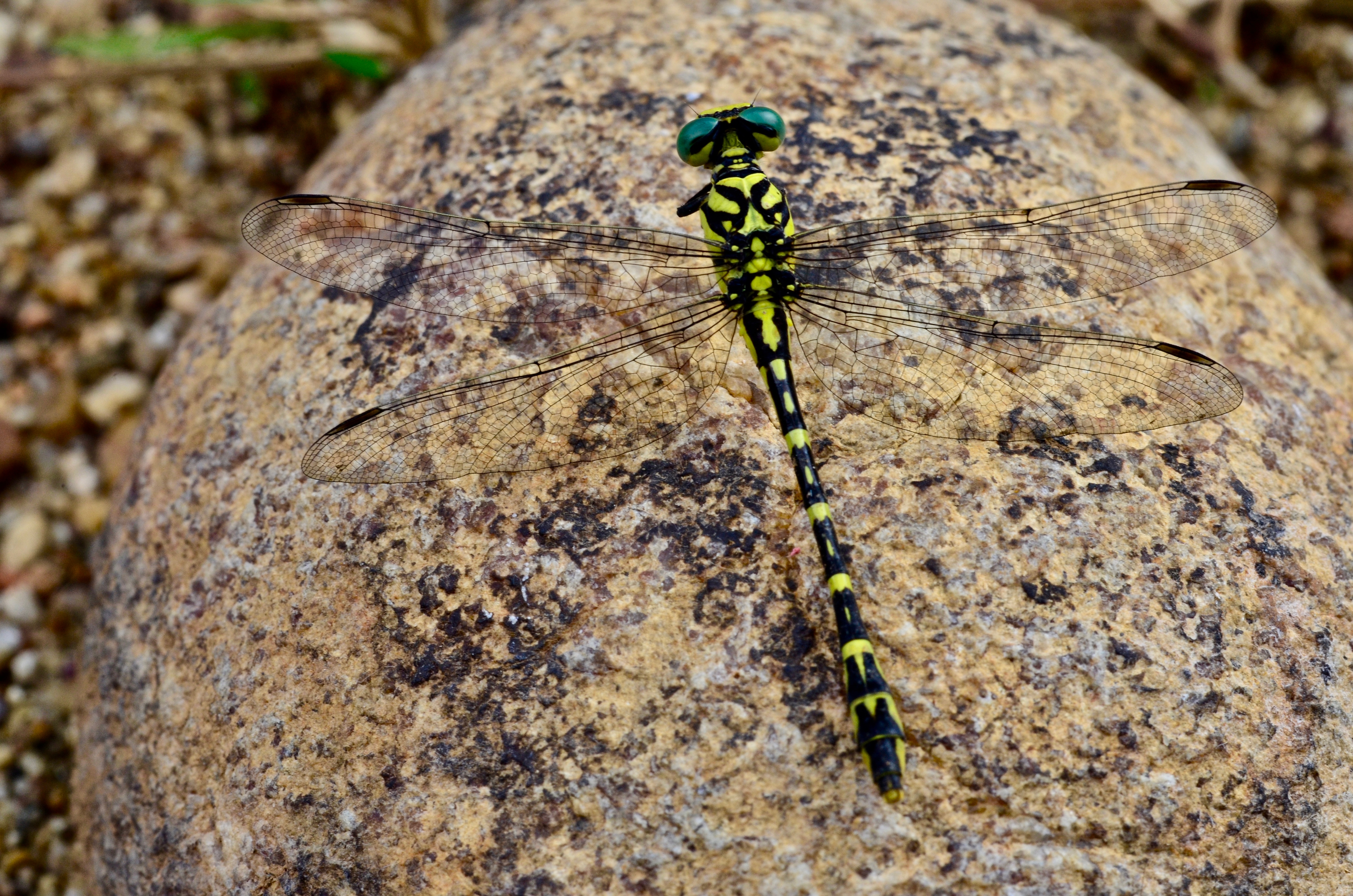
female

==== Genus: Davidioides ====
===== Species: Davidioides martini =====
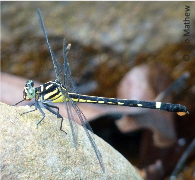
male

==== Genus: Gomphidia ====
===== Species: Gomphidia kodaguensis =====
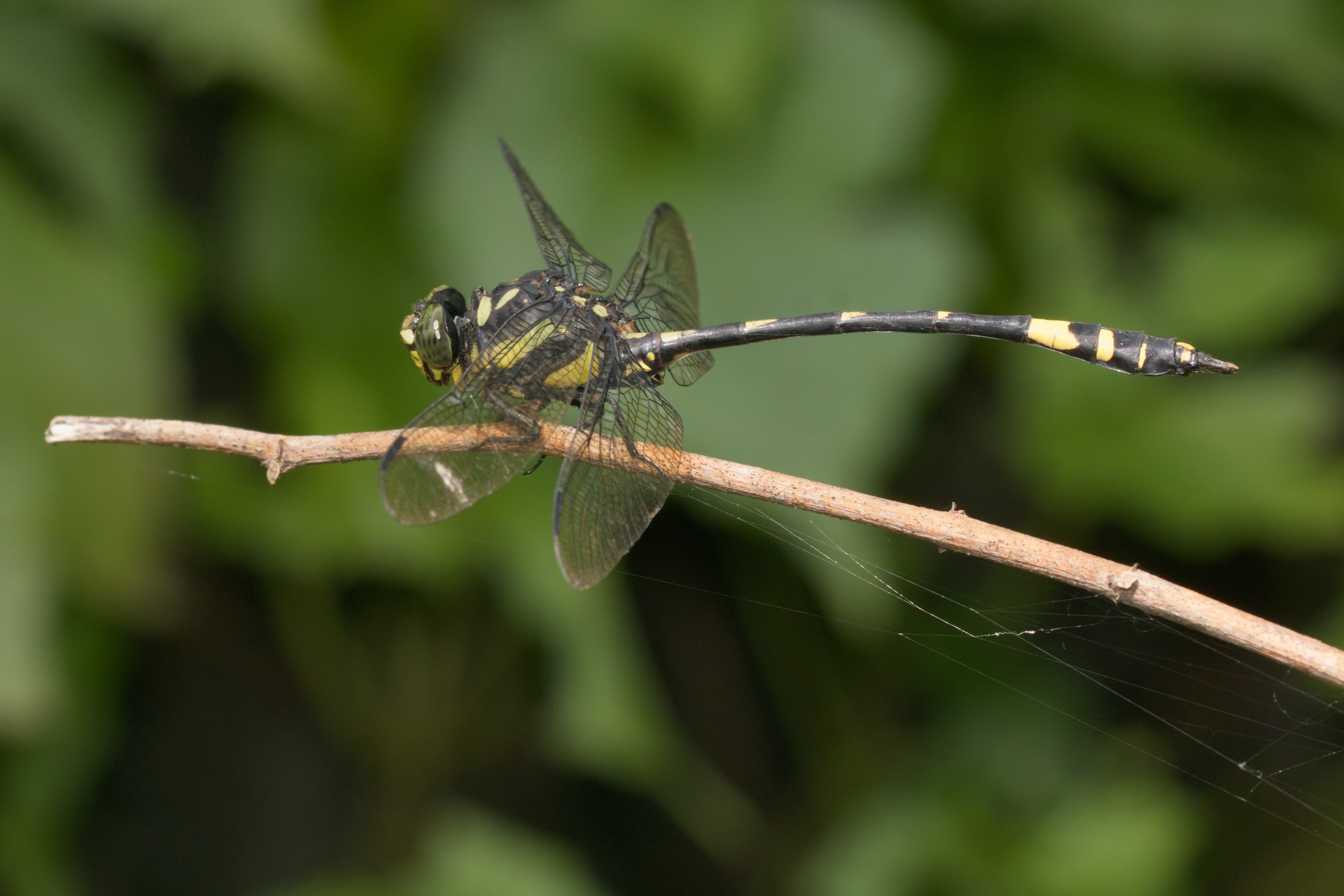
male

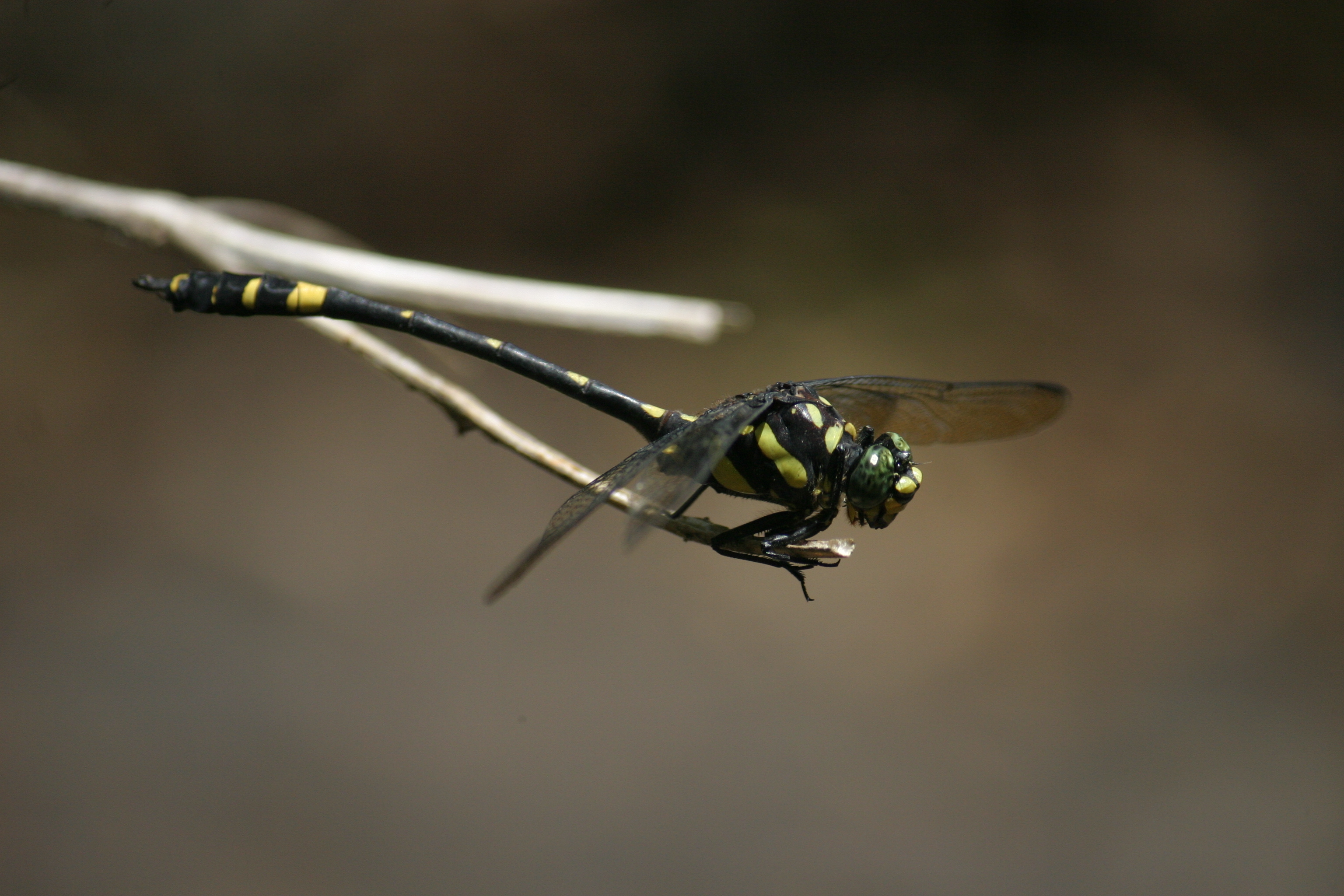
male

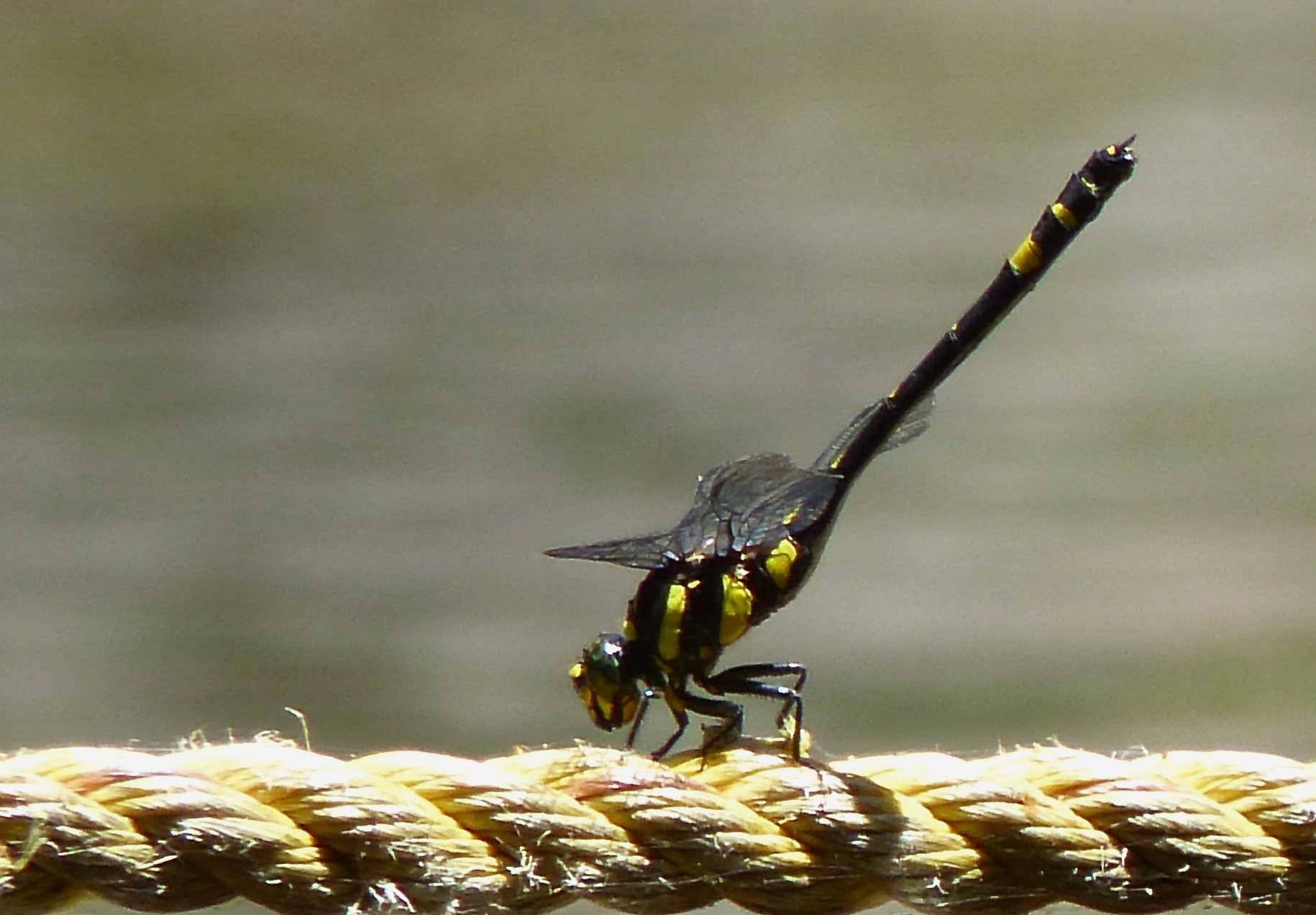
female

==== Genus: Heliogomphus ====
===== Species: Heliogomphus promelas =====
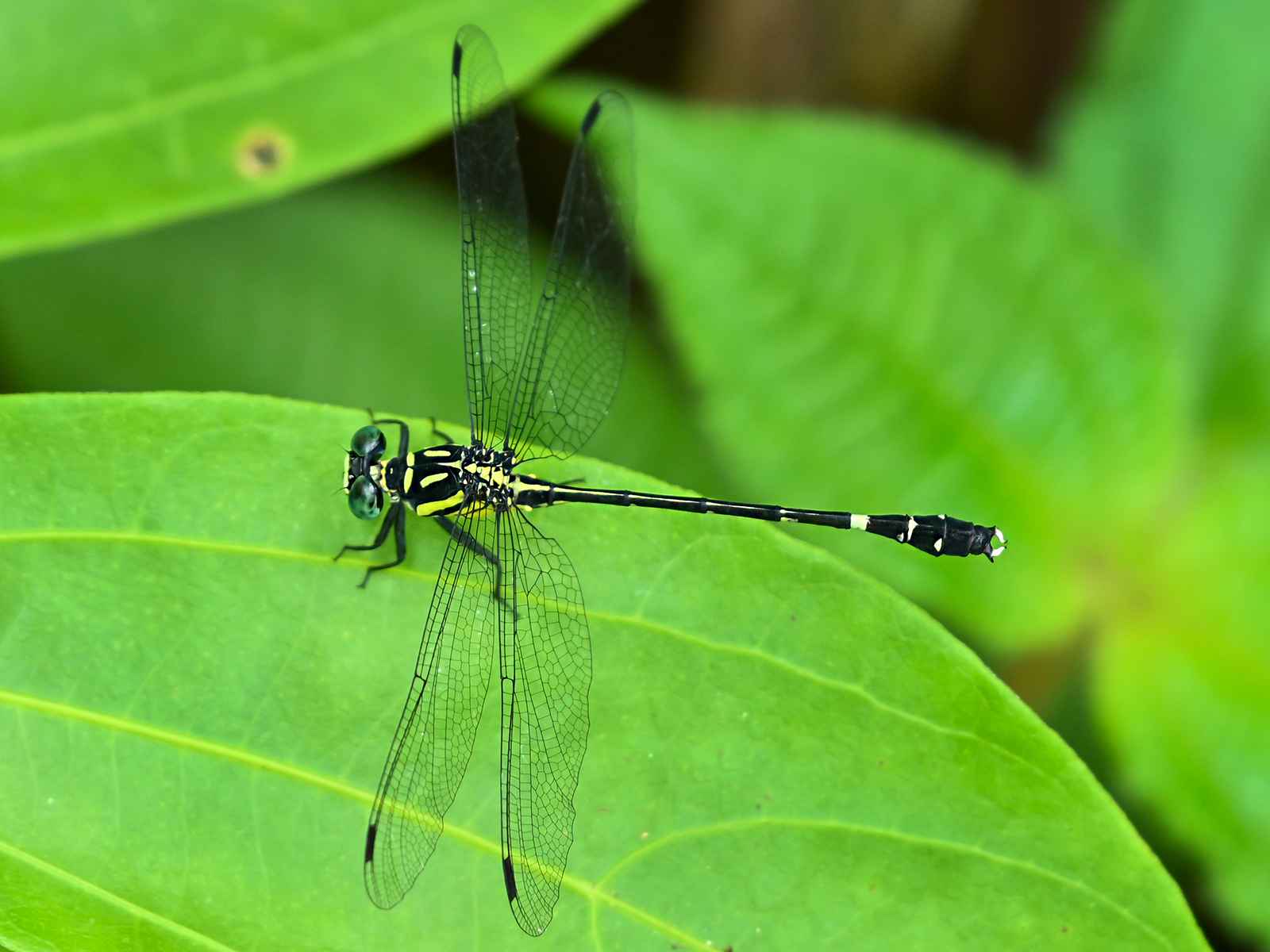
Heliogomphus promelas male

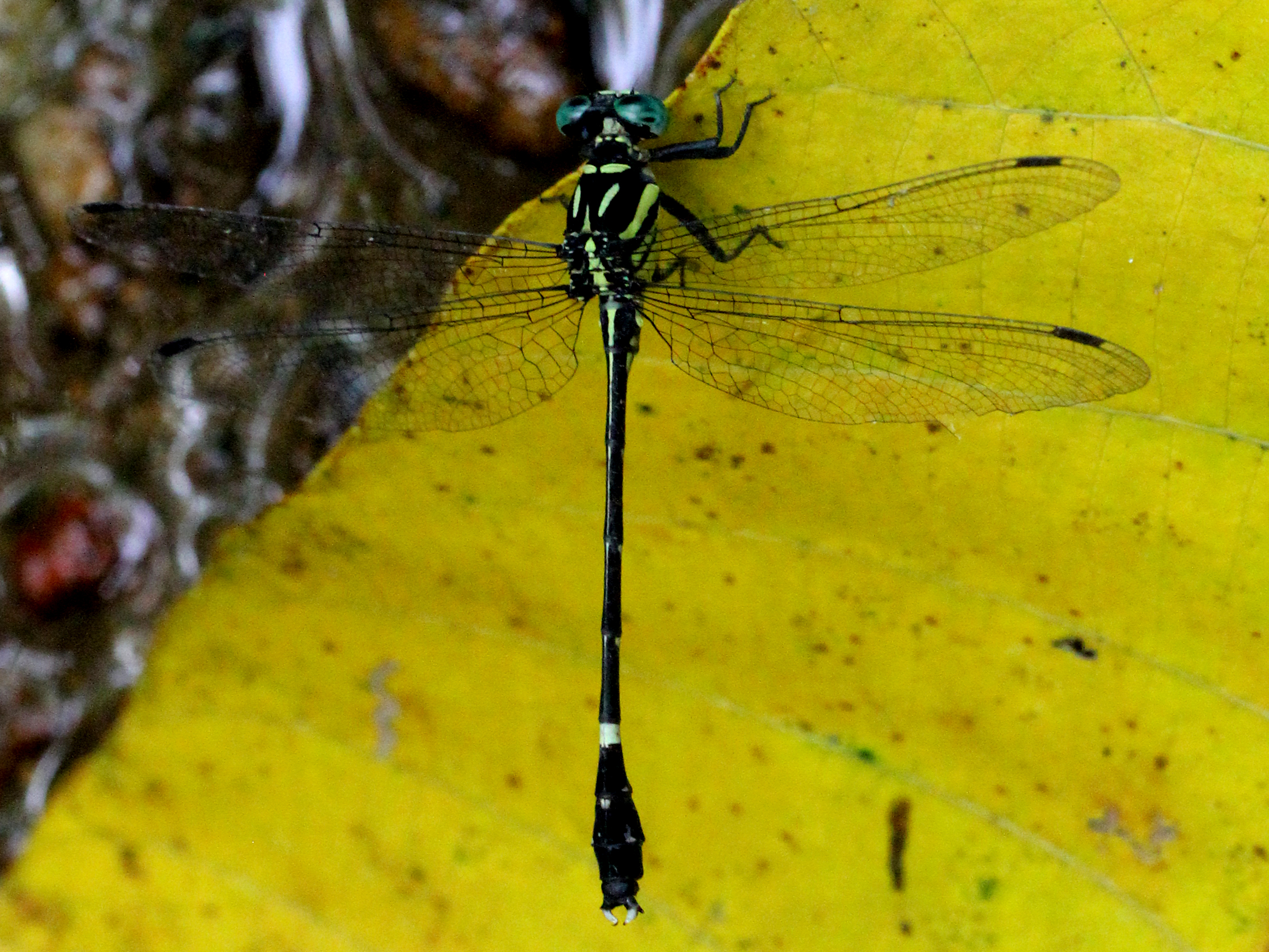
Heliogomphus promelas male

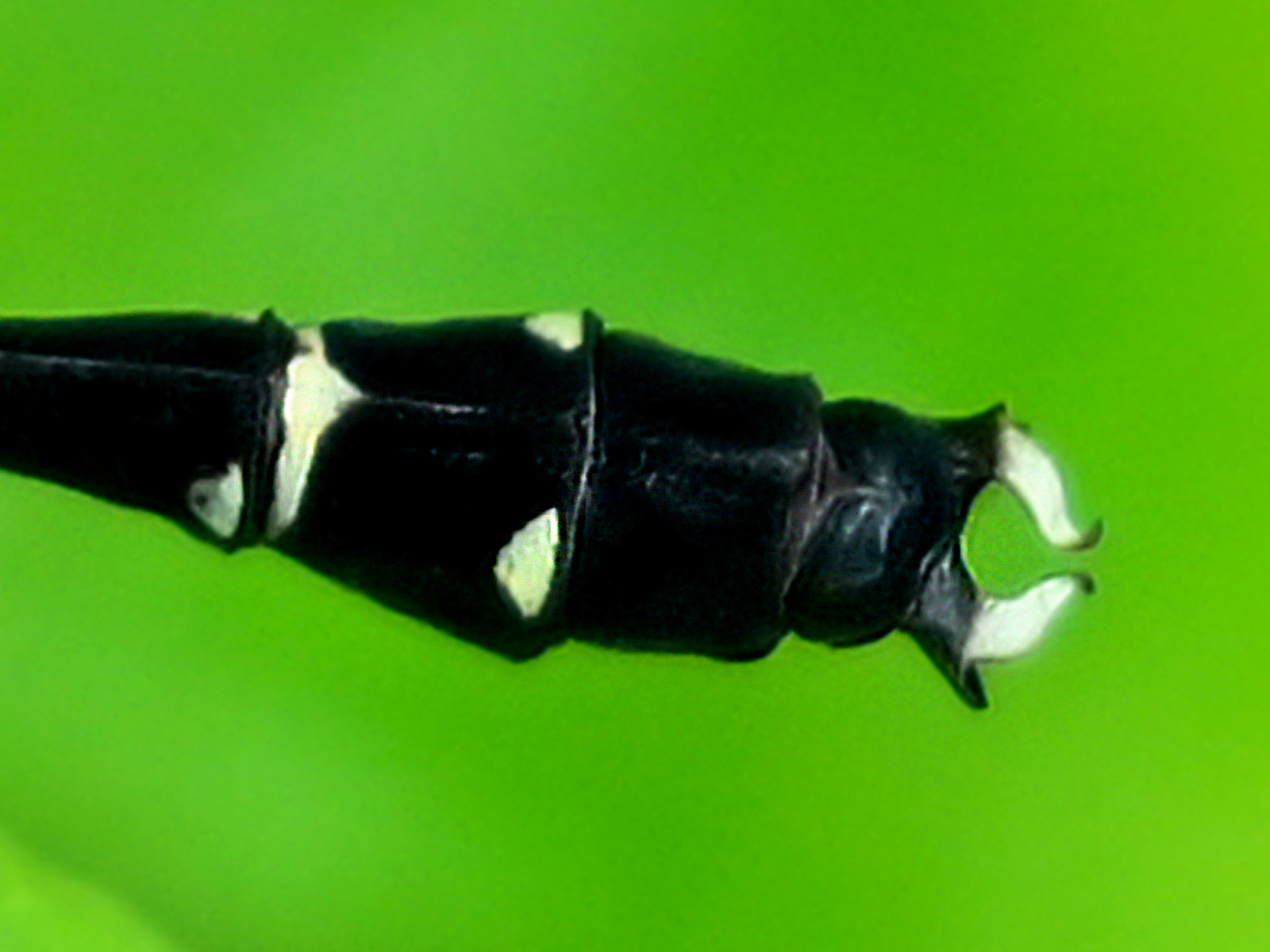
Appendages

==== Genus: Ictinogomphus ====
===== Species: Ictinogomphus rapax =====
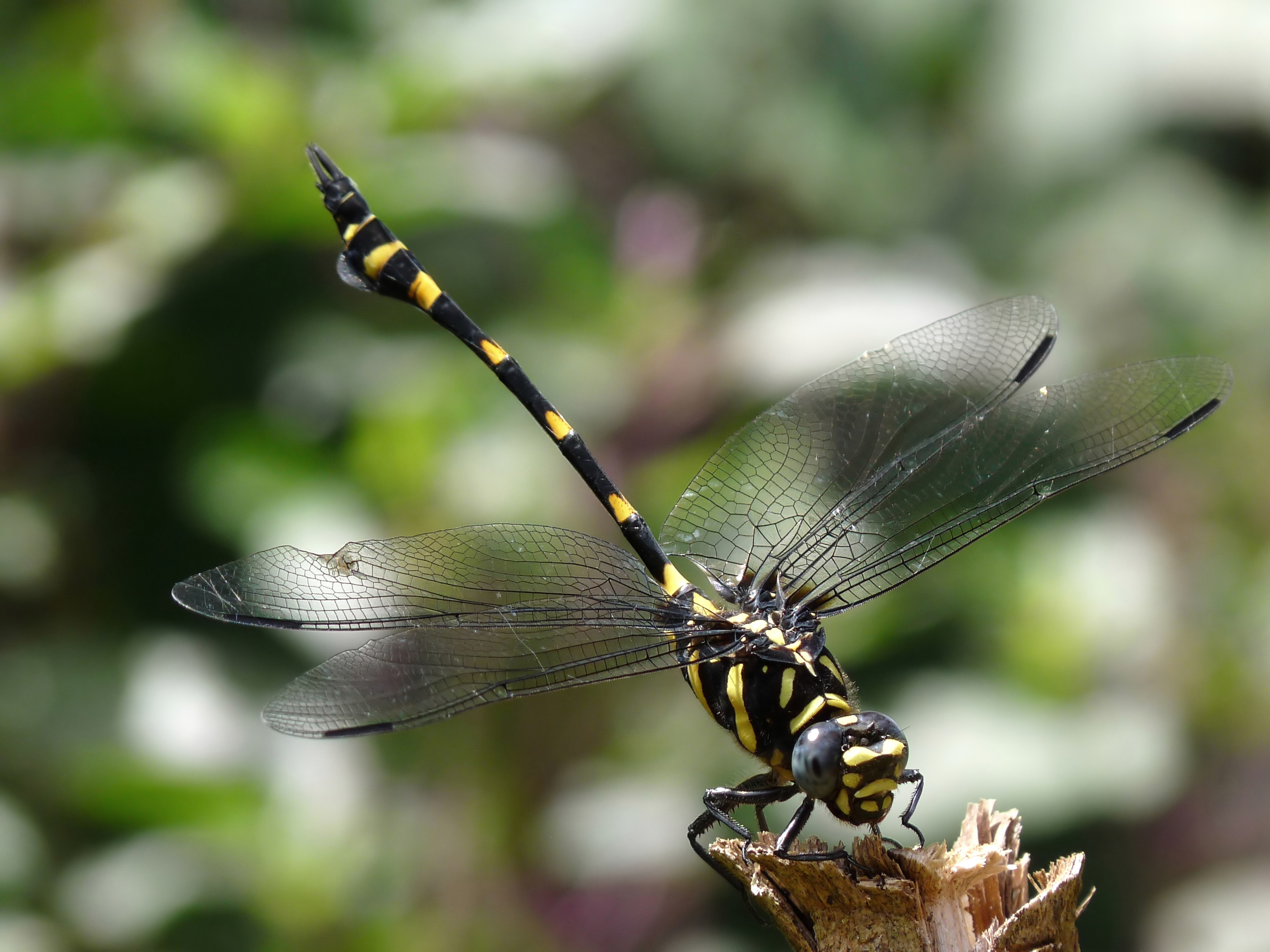
Ictinogomphus rapax male

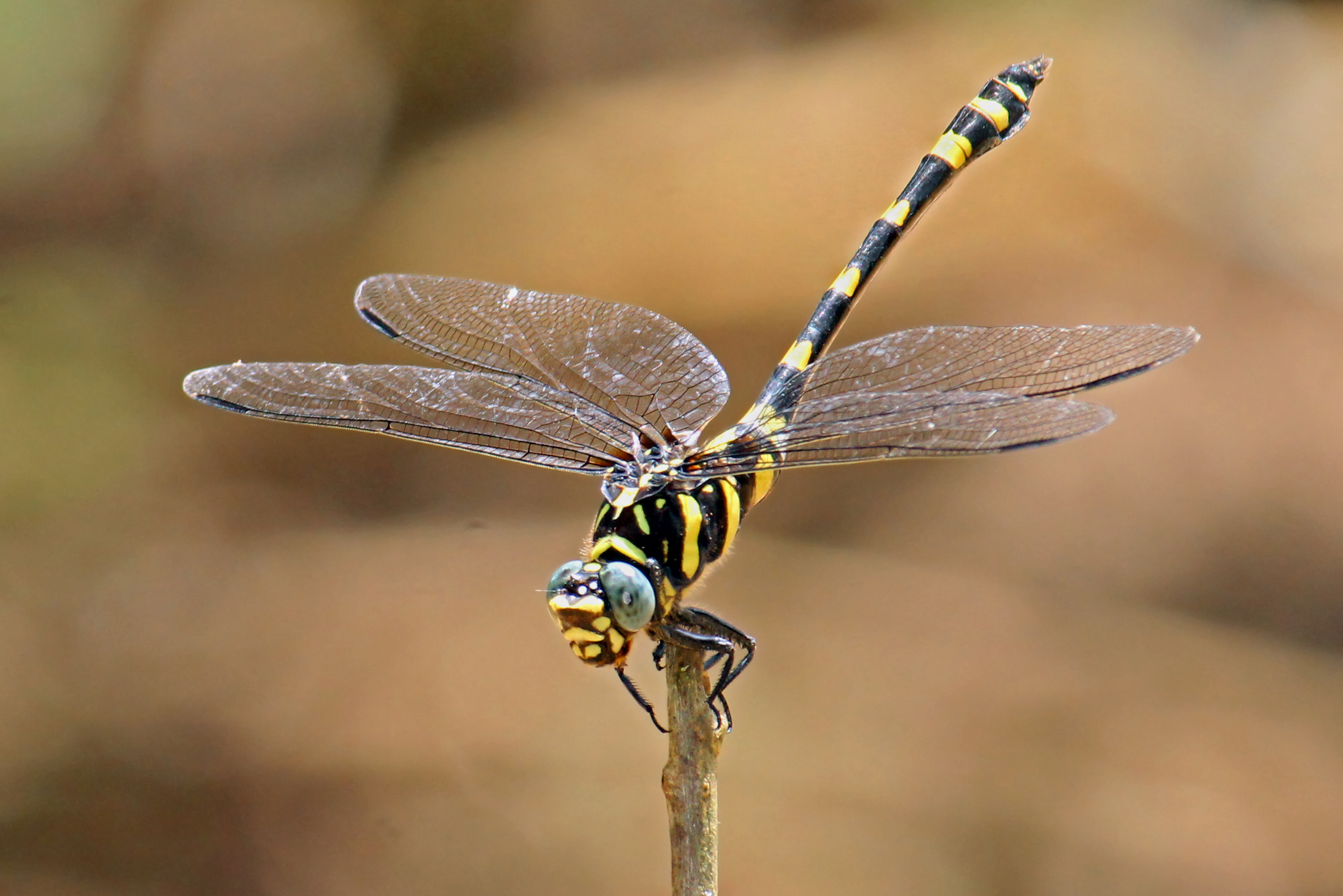
Ictinogomphus rapax female

==== Genus: Lamelligomphus ====
===== Species: Lamelligomphus nilgiriensis =====
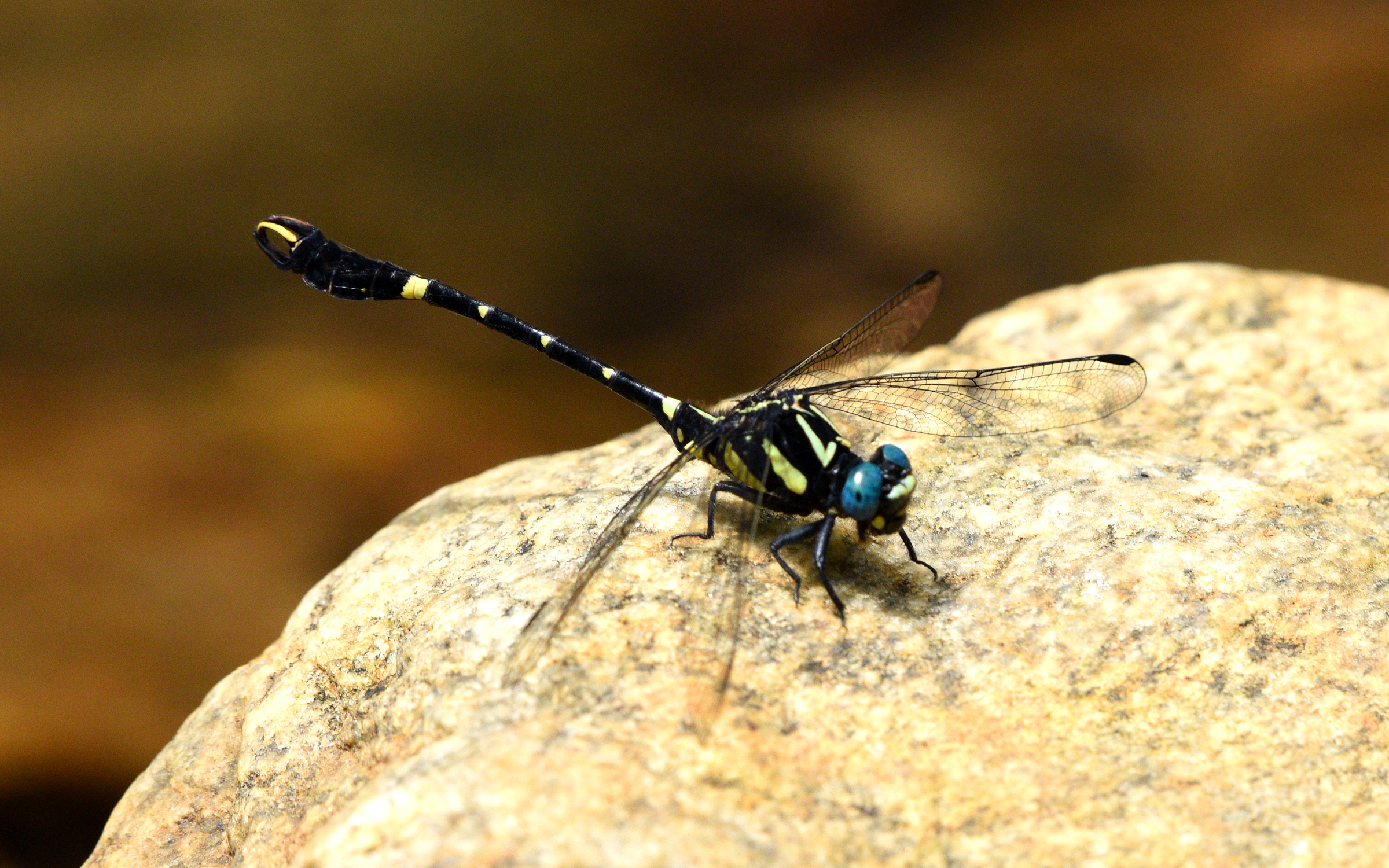
male

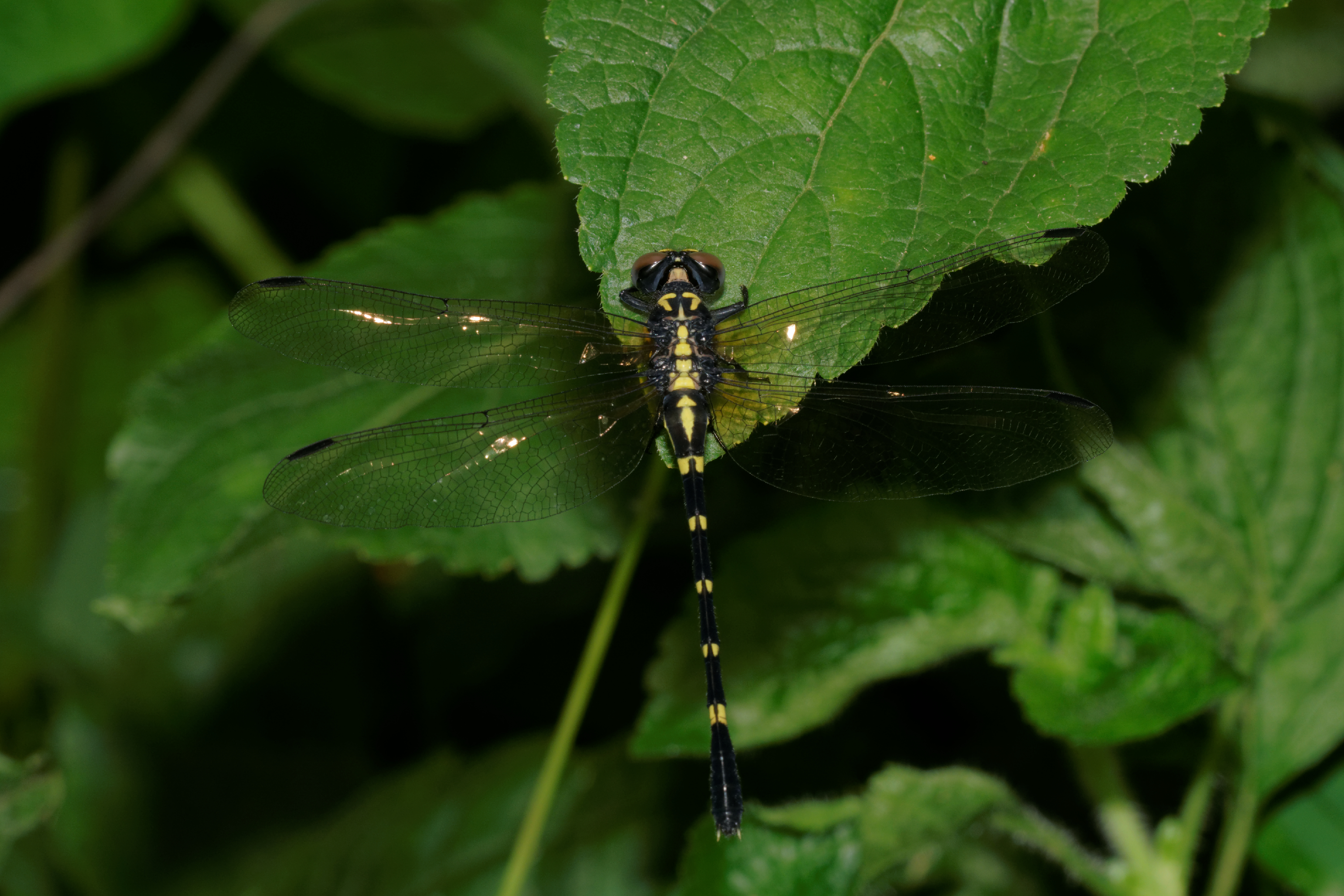
female

==== Genus: Macrogomphus ====
===== Species: Macrogomphus wynaadicus =====
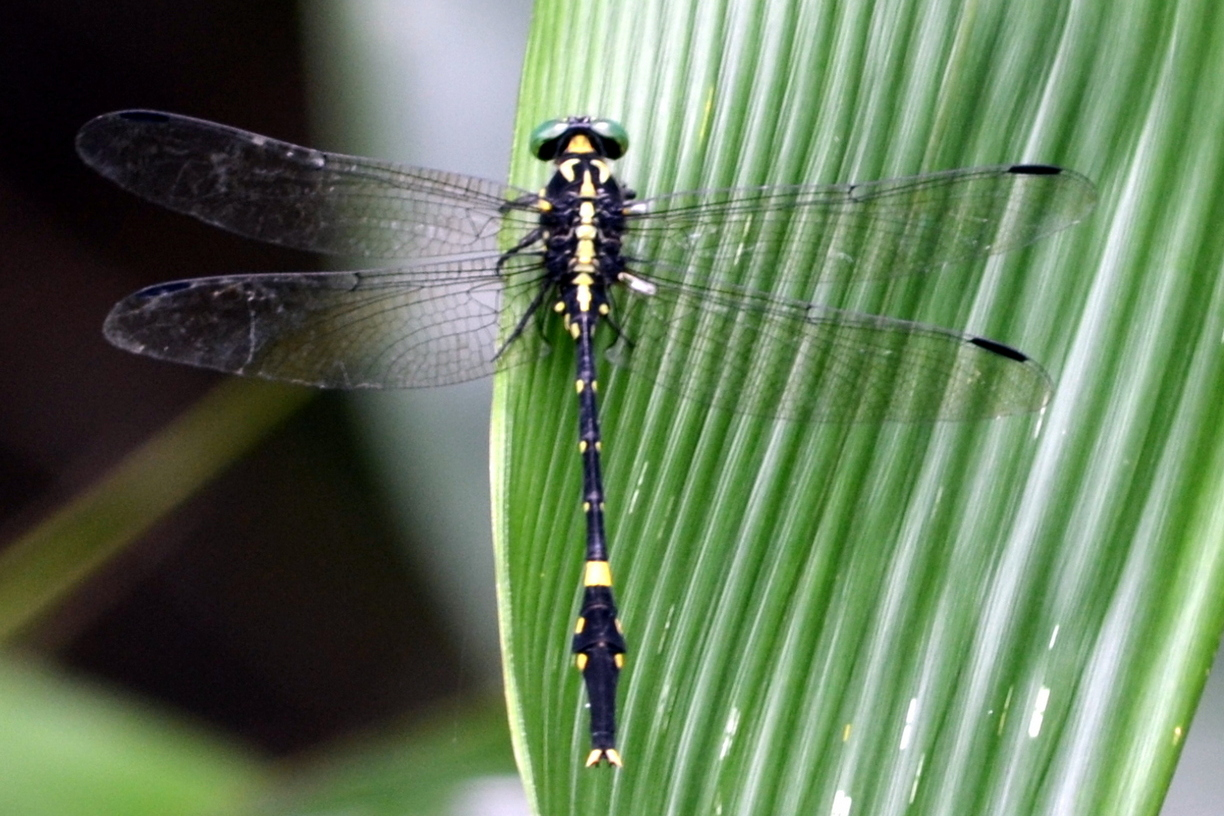
male

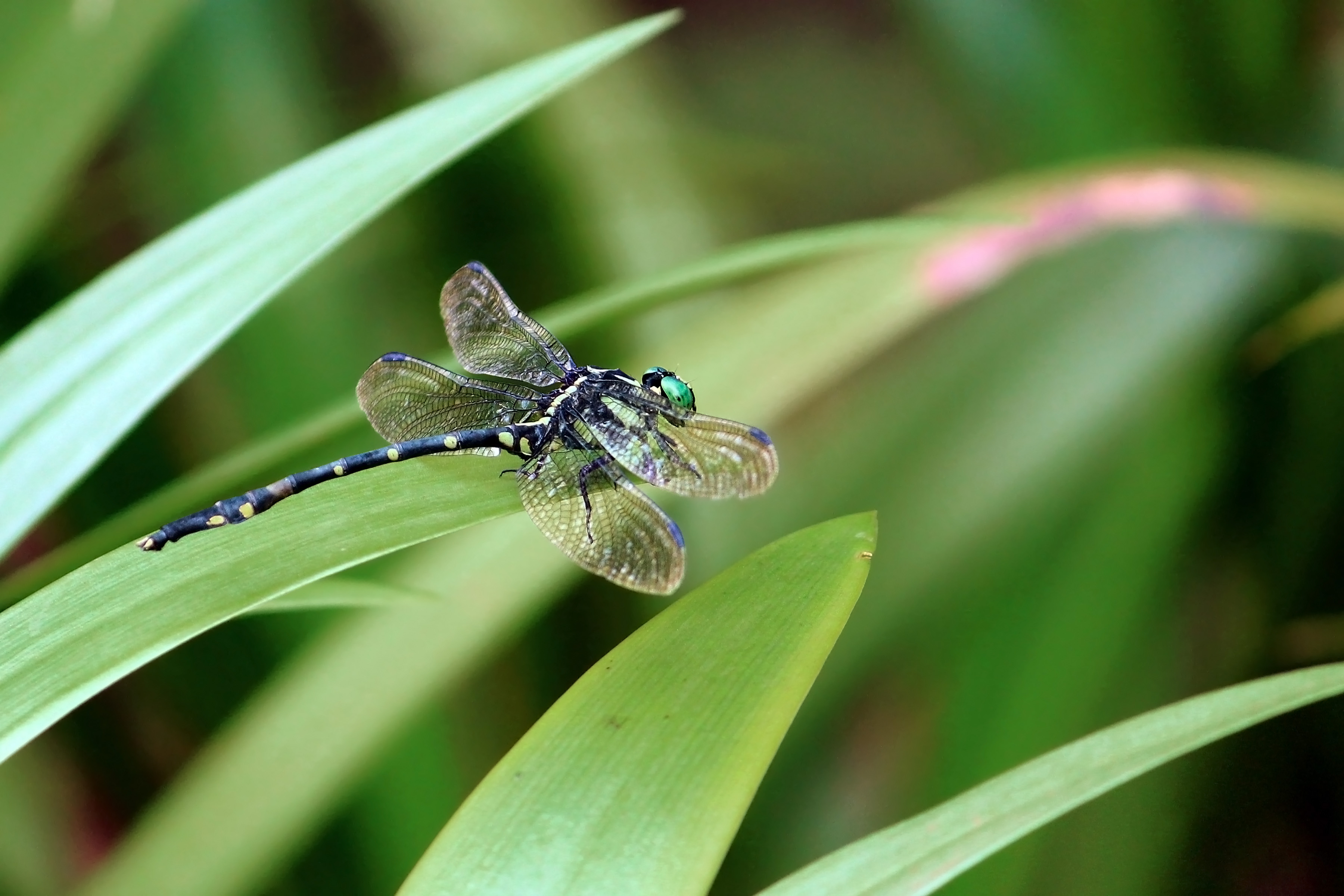
male

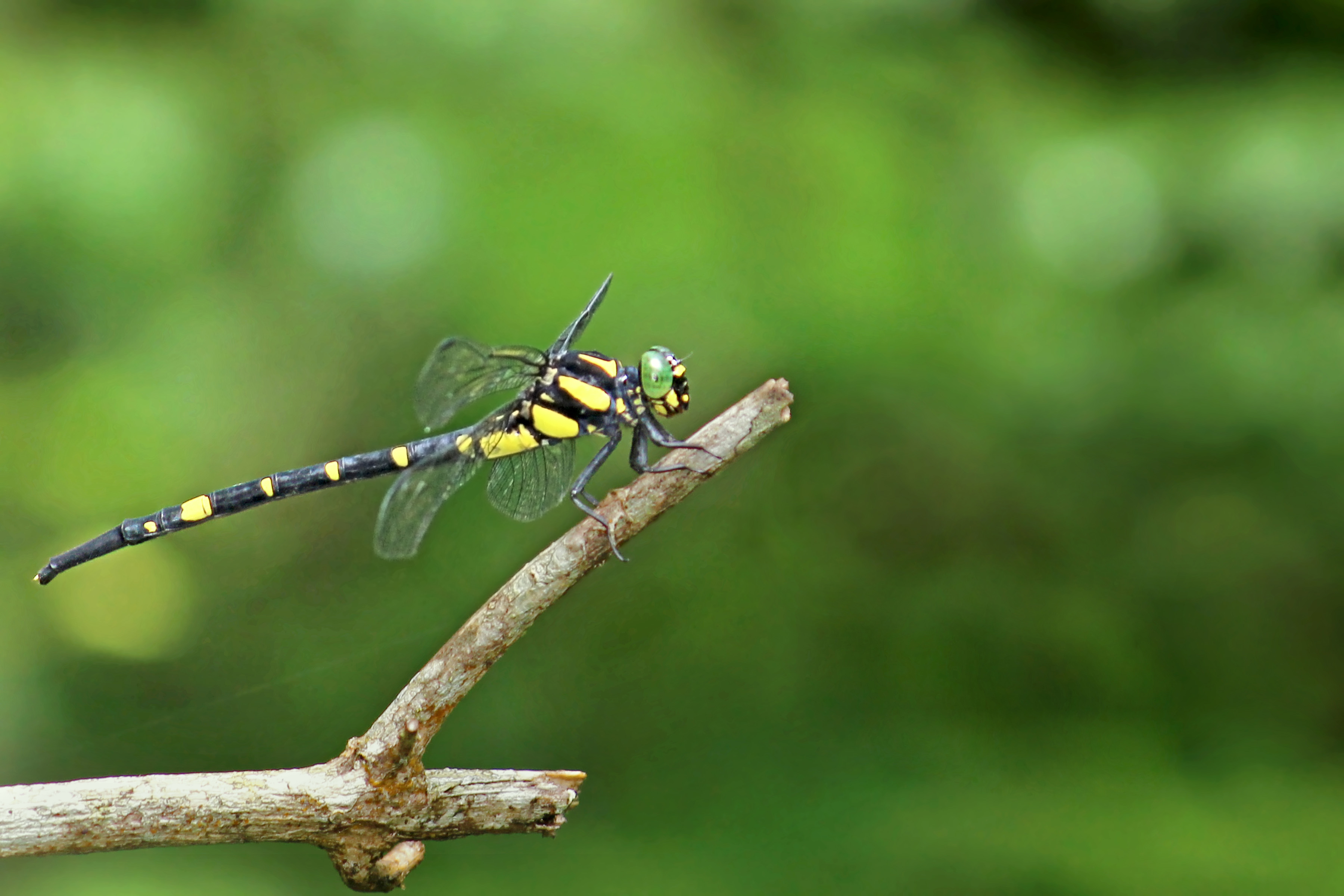
female

==== Genus: Megalogomphus ====
===== Species: Megalogomphus hannyngtoni =====
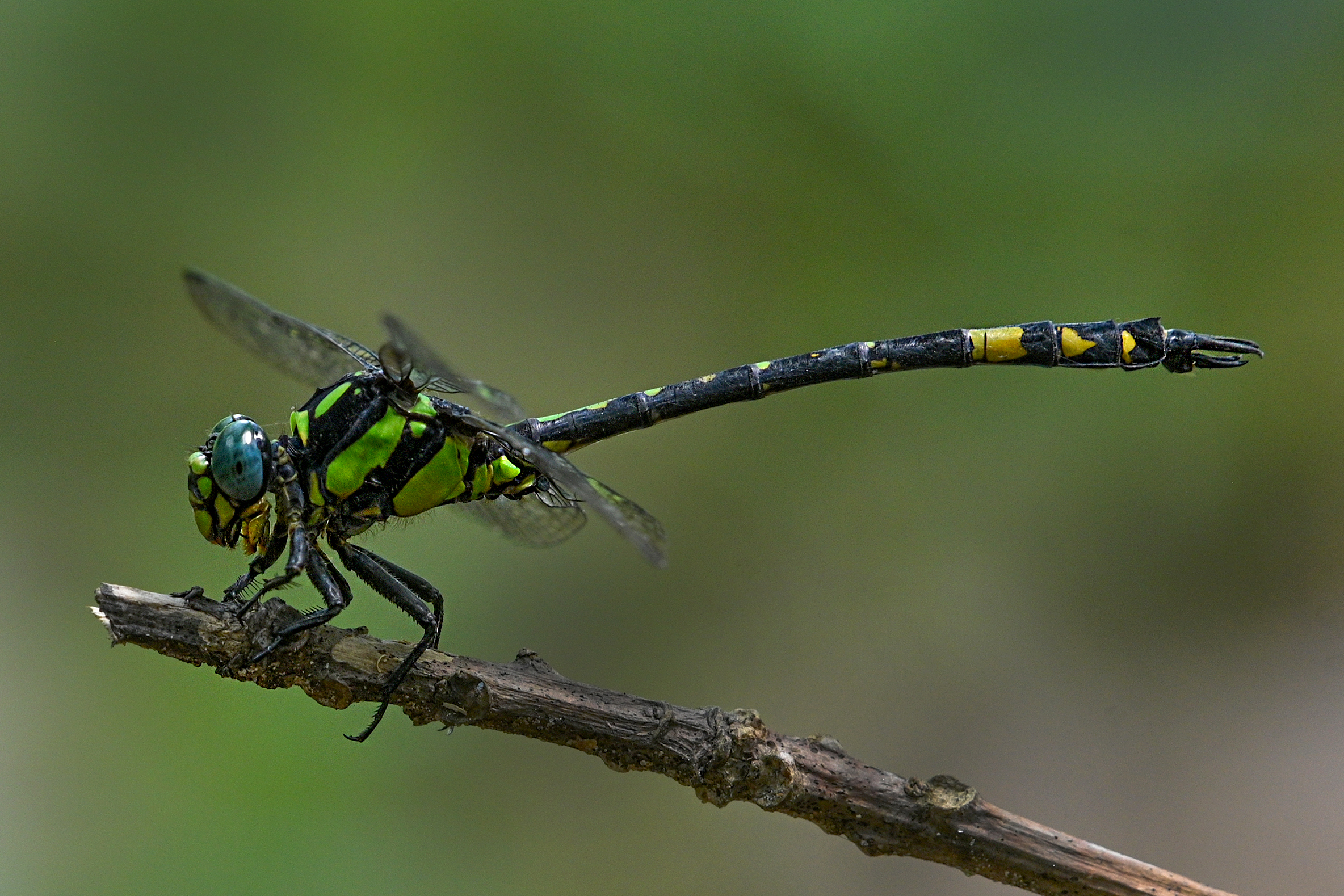
male

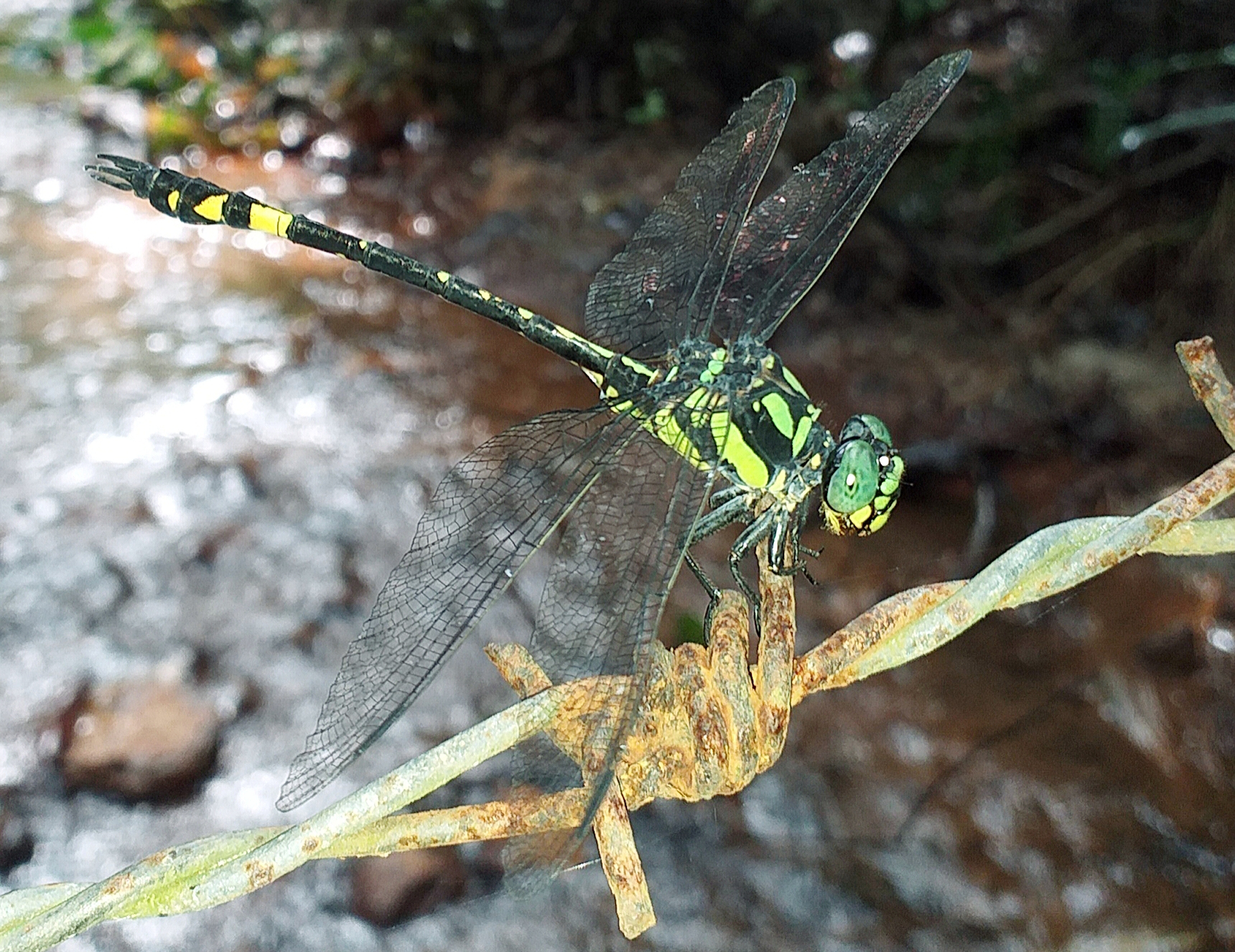
male

===== Species: Megalogomphus superbus =====
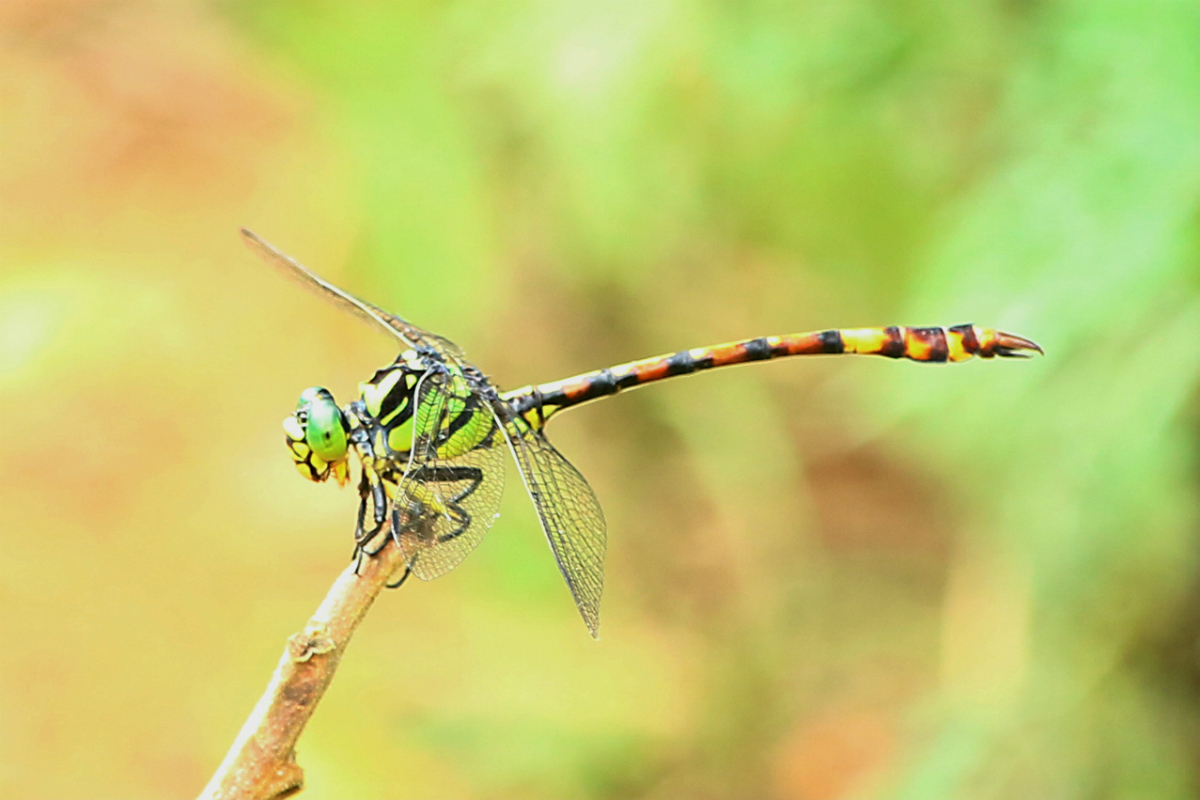
male

==== Genus: Melligomphus ====
===== Species: Melligomphus acinaces =====
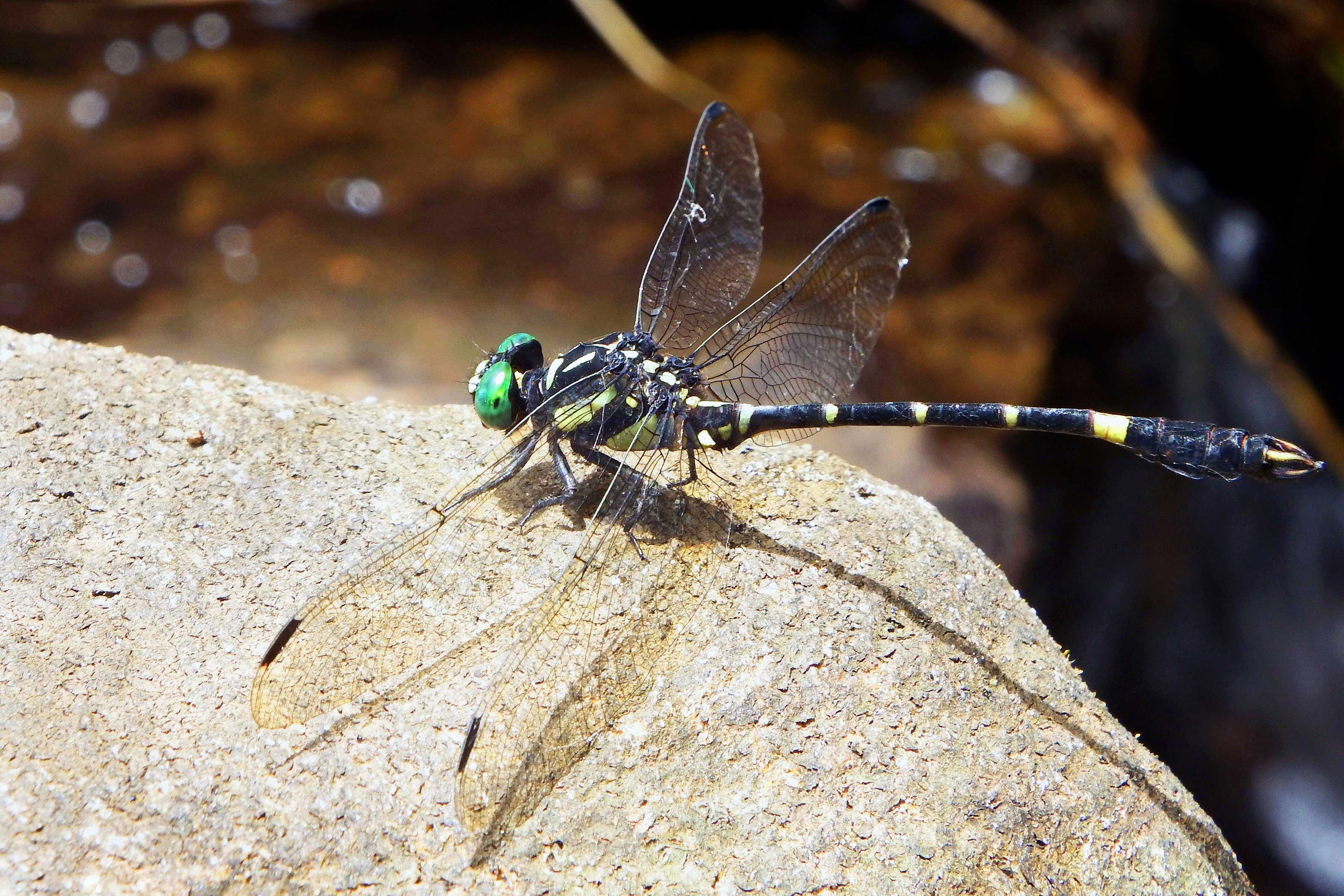
male

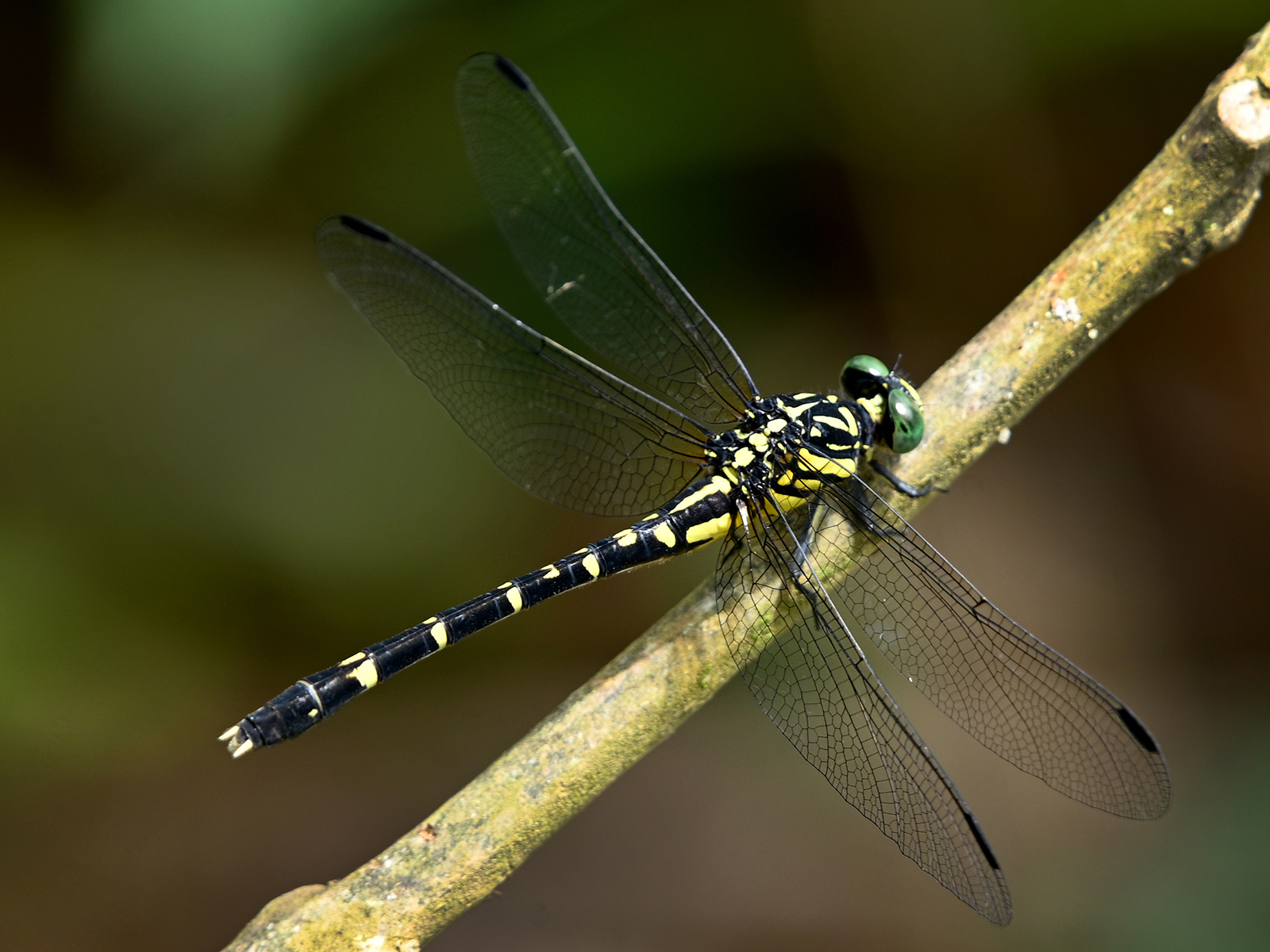
Onychogomphus acinaces female

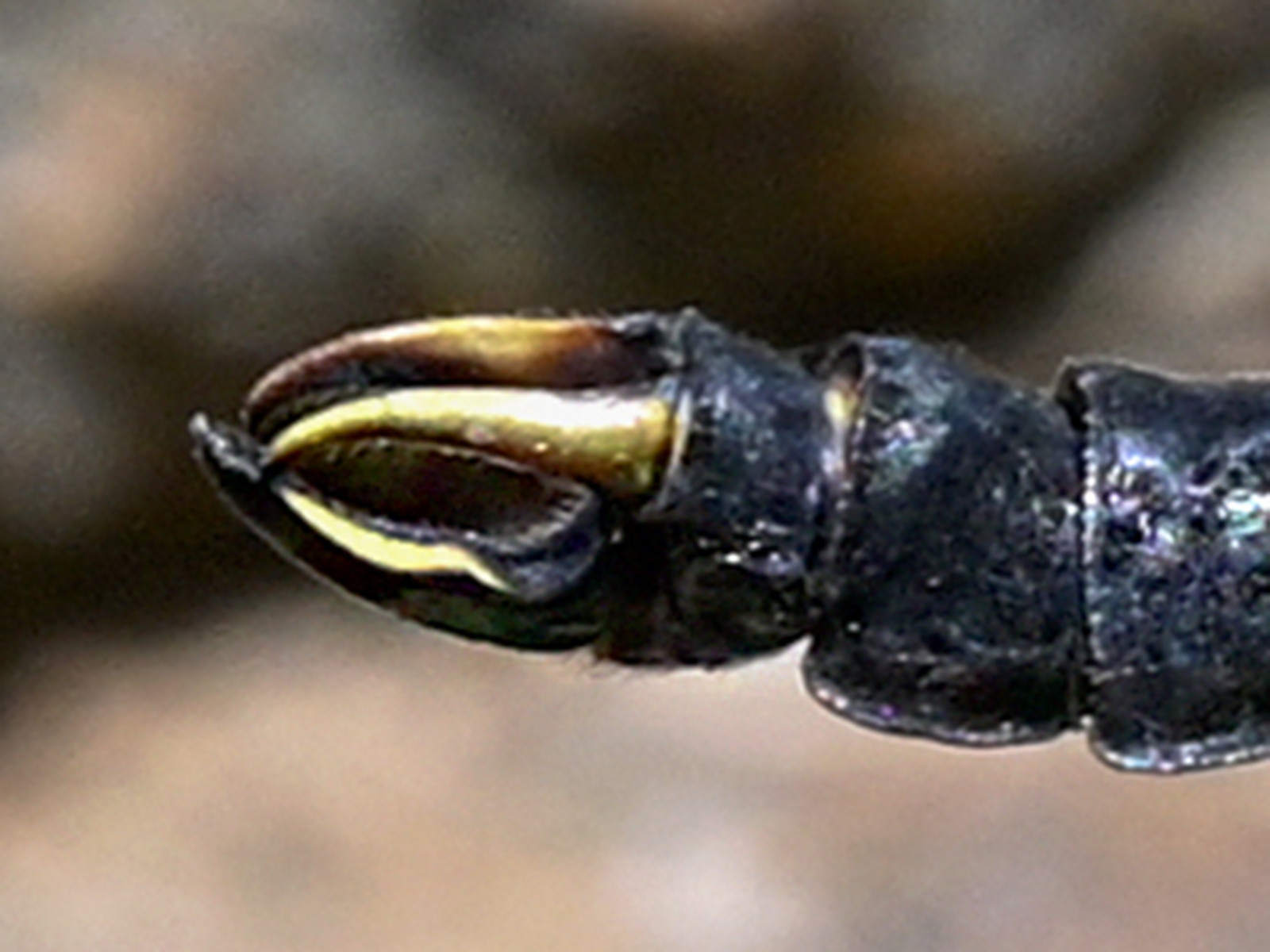
Appendages

==== Genus: Merogomphus ====
===== Species: Merogomphus longistigma =====
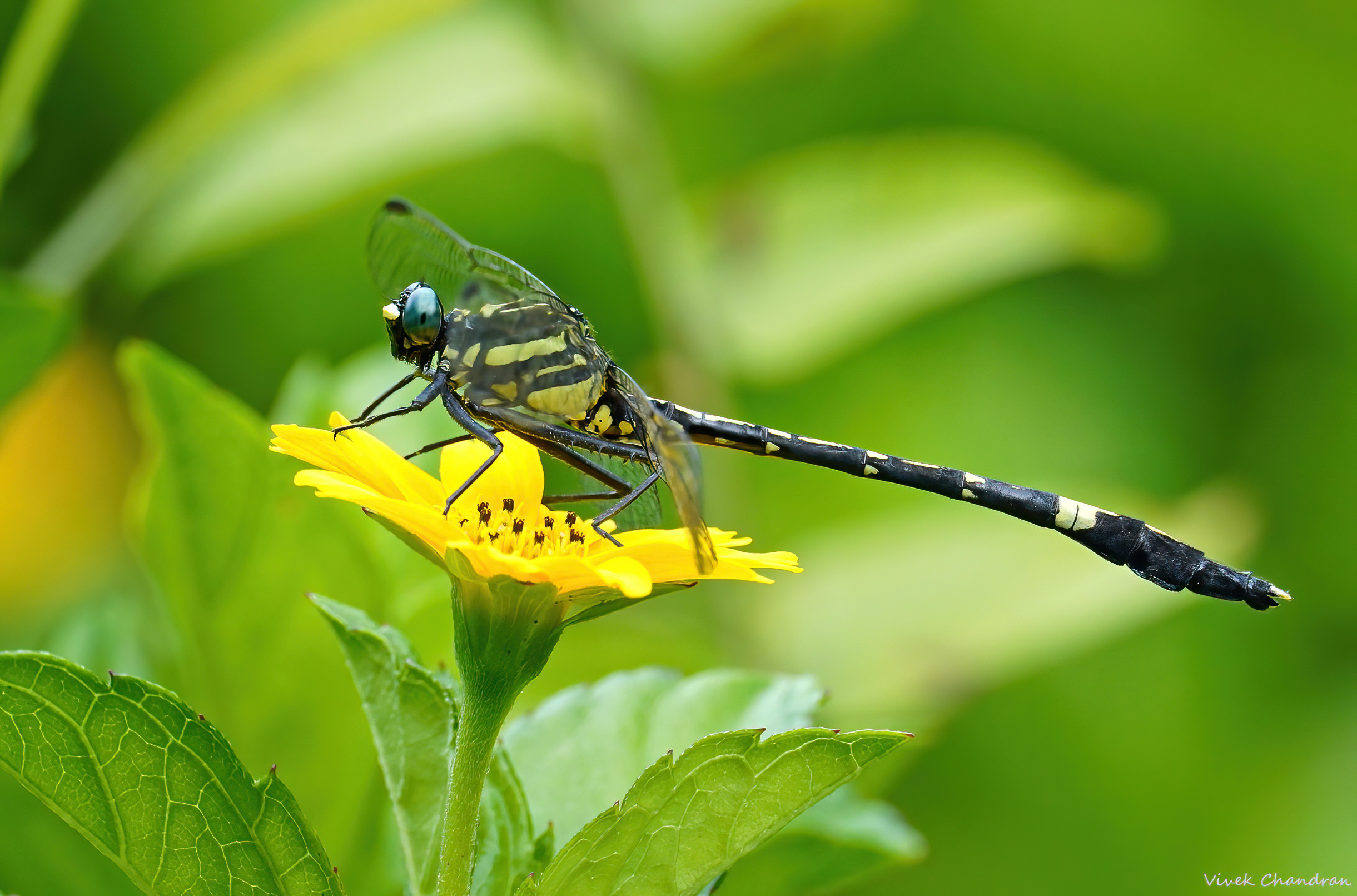
male

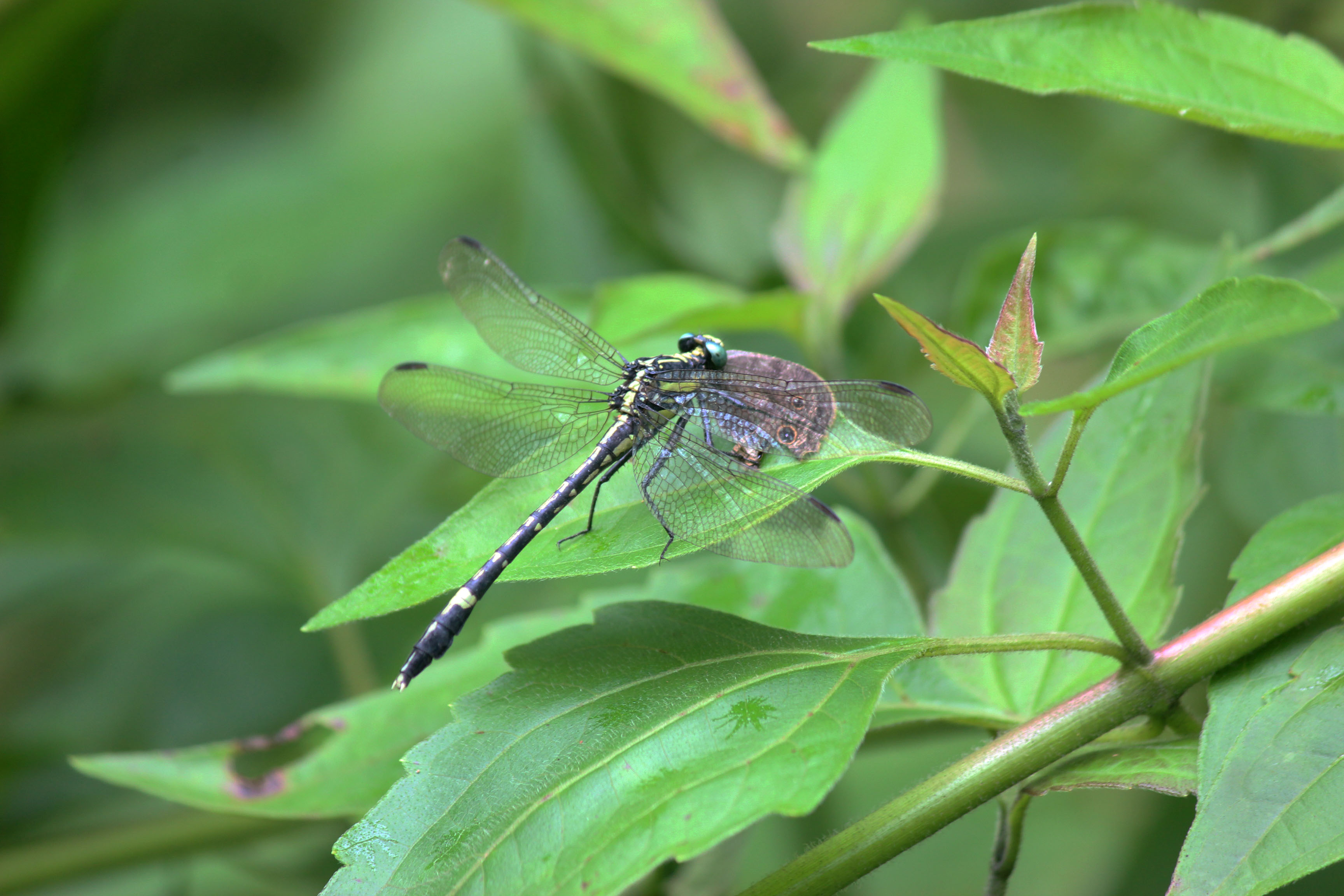
female

===== Species: Merogomphus tamaracherriensis =====
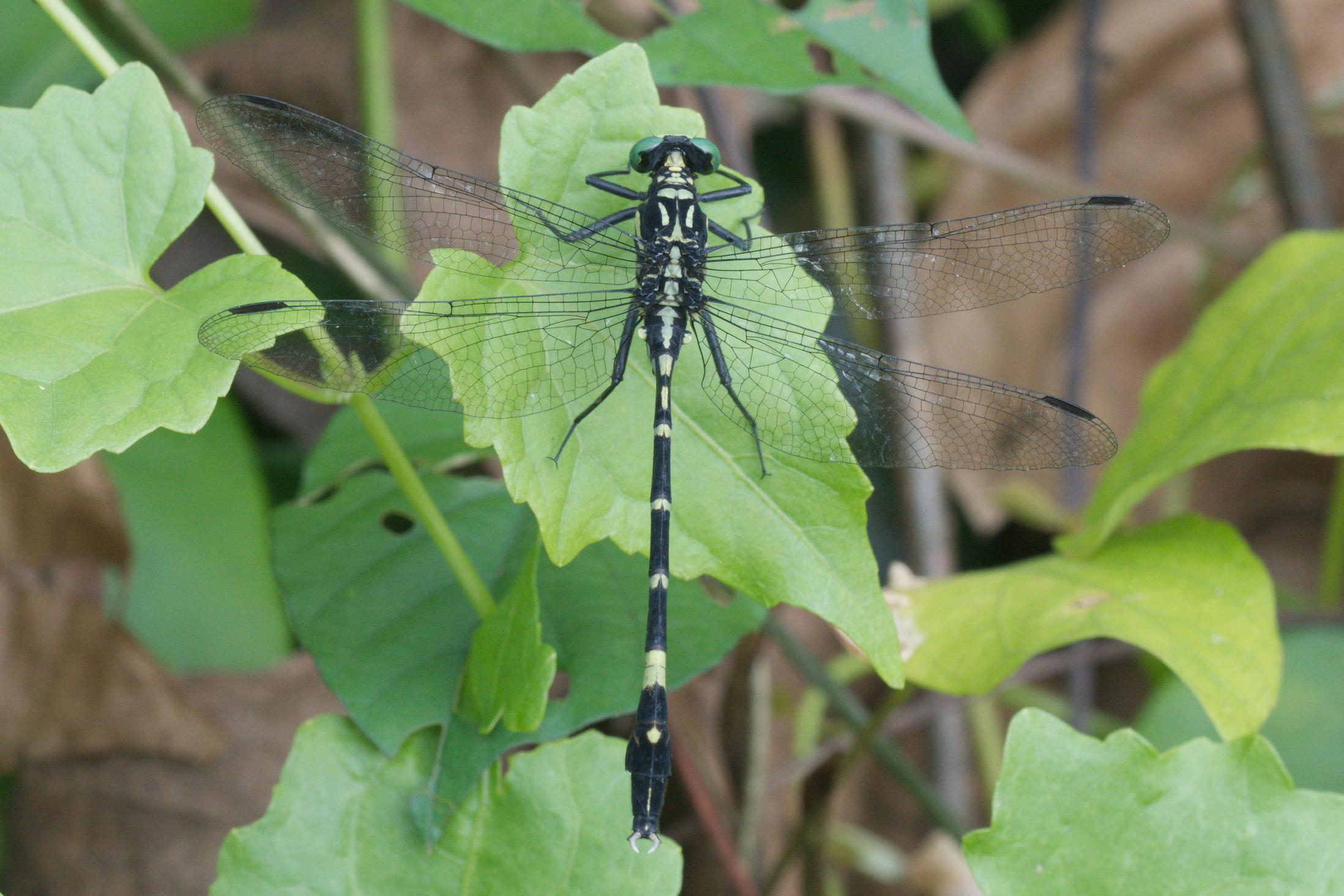
male

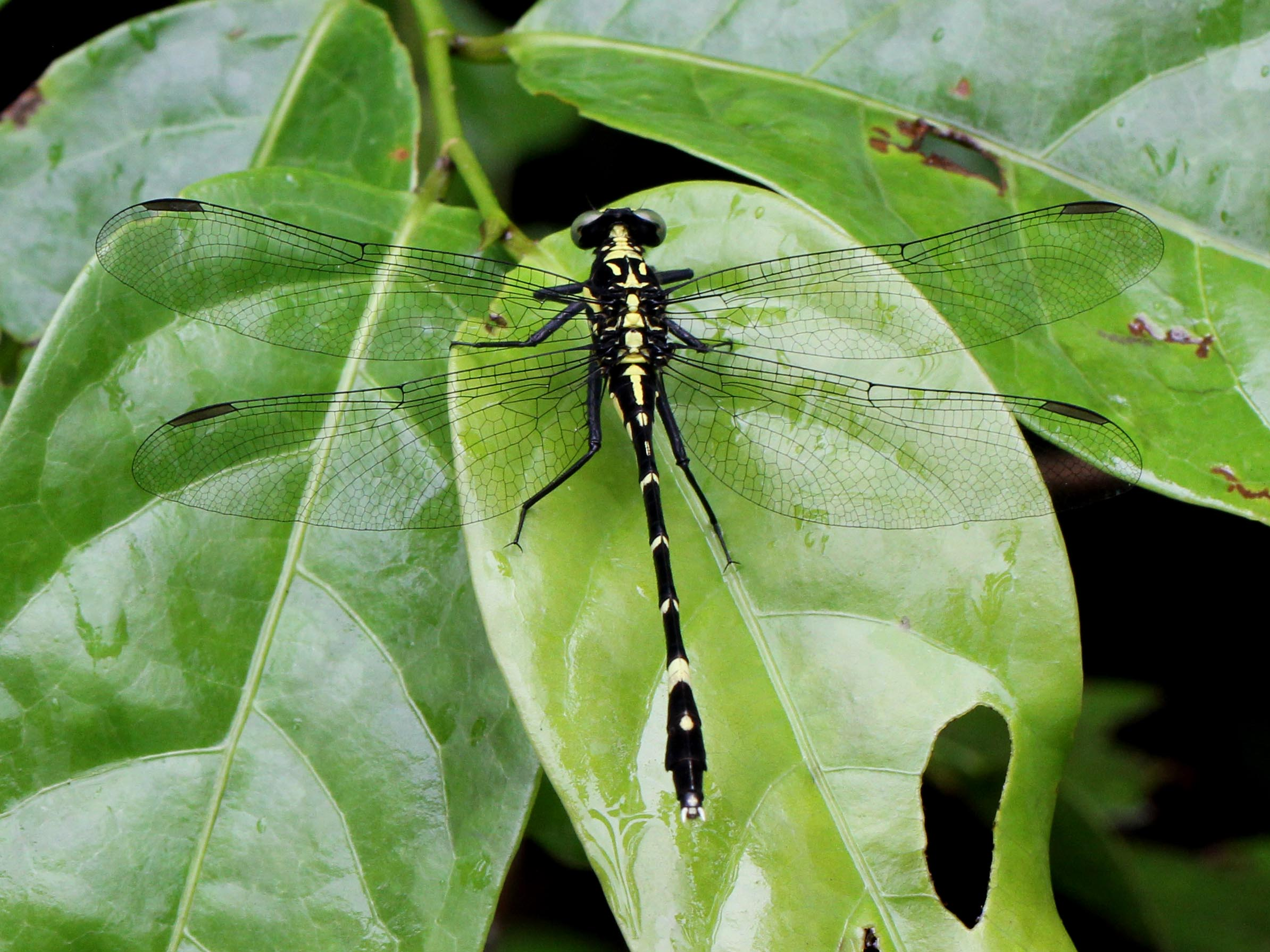
female

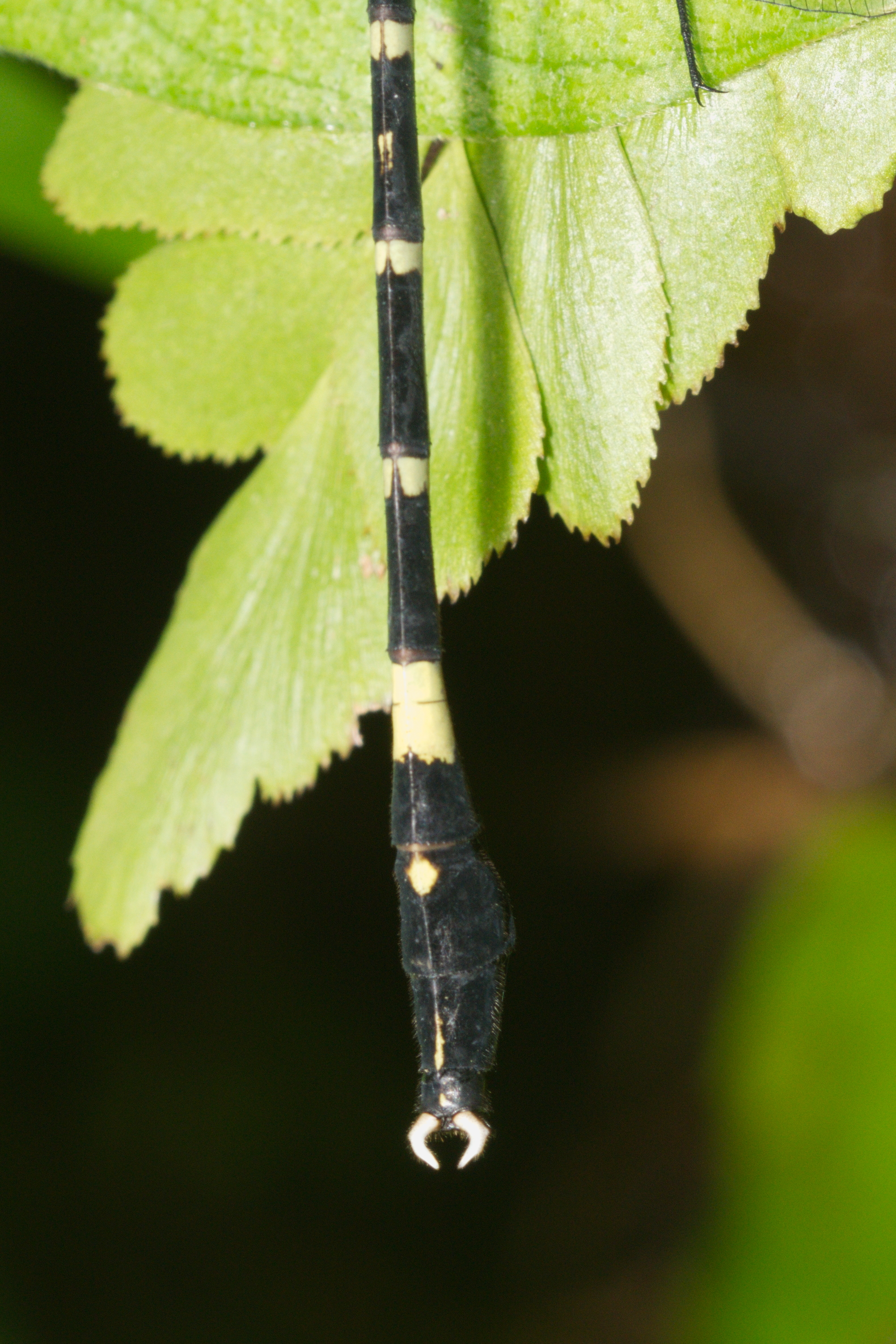
male (appendages)

==== Genus: Microgomphus ====
===== Species: Microgomphus souteri =====
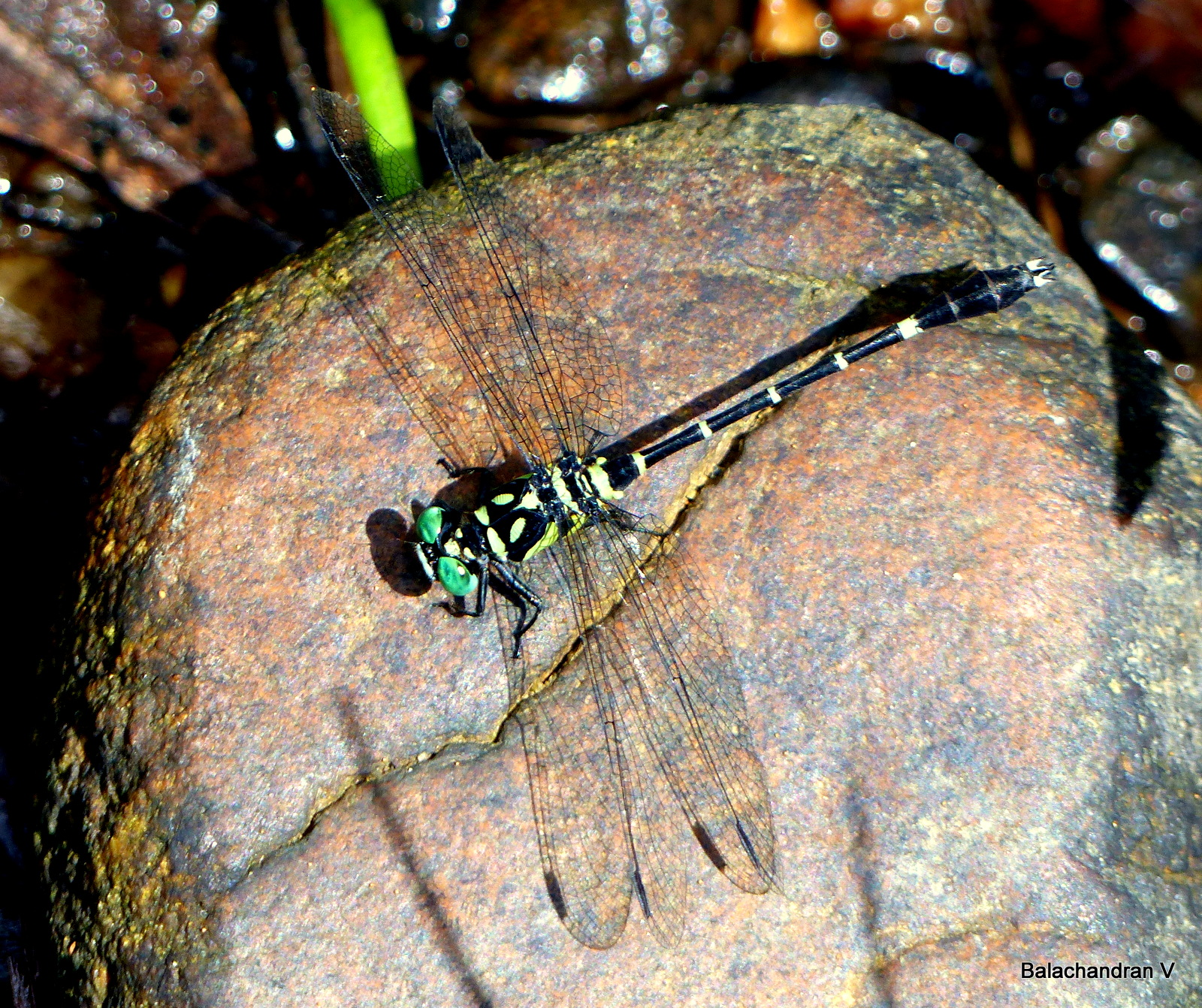
Microgomphus souteri male

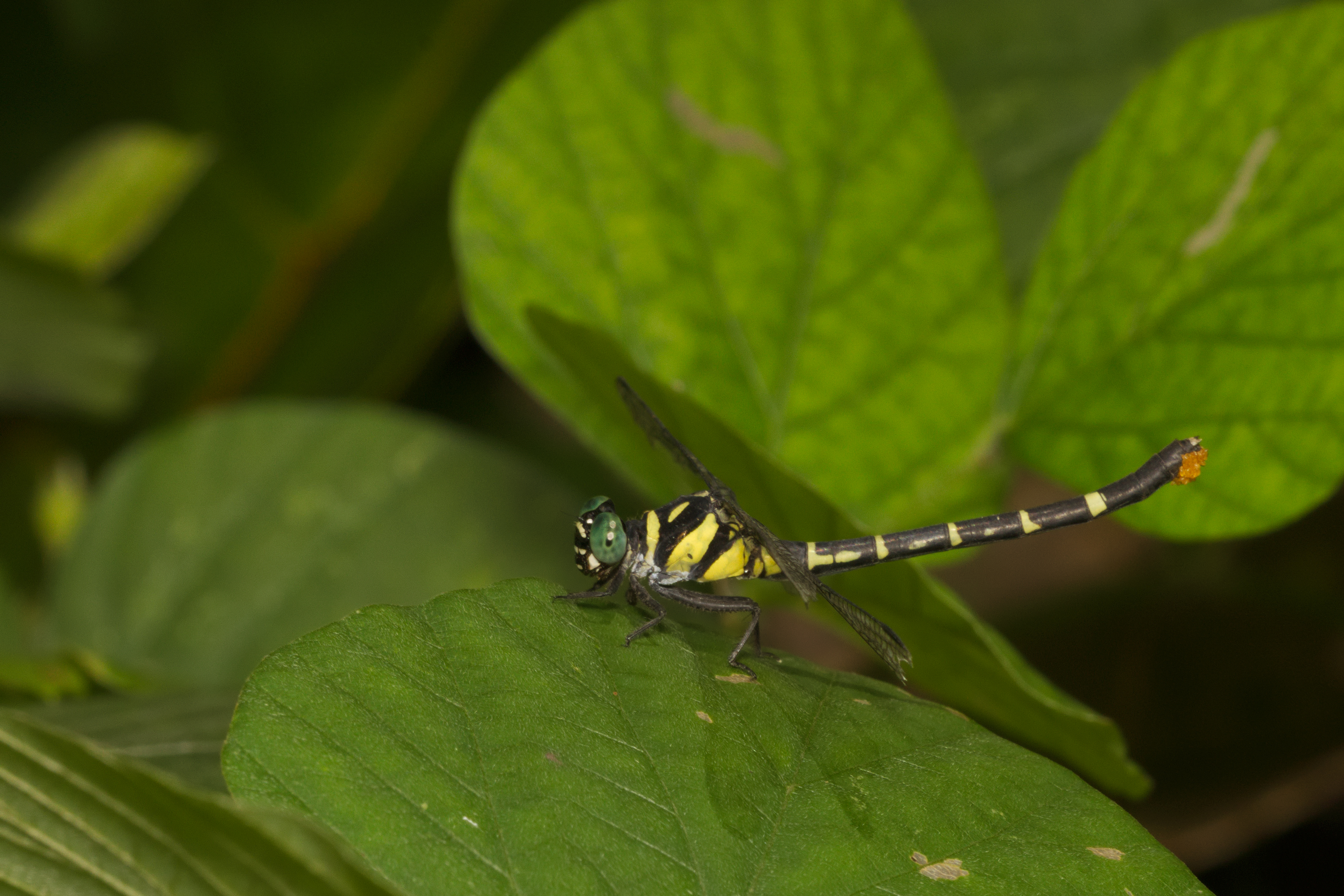
Microgomphus souteri female

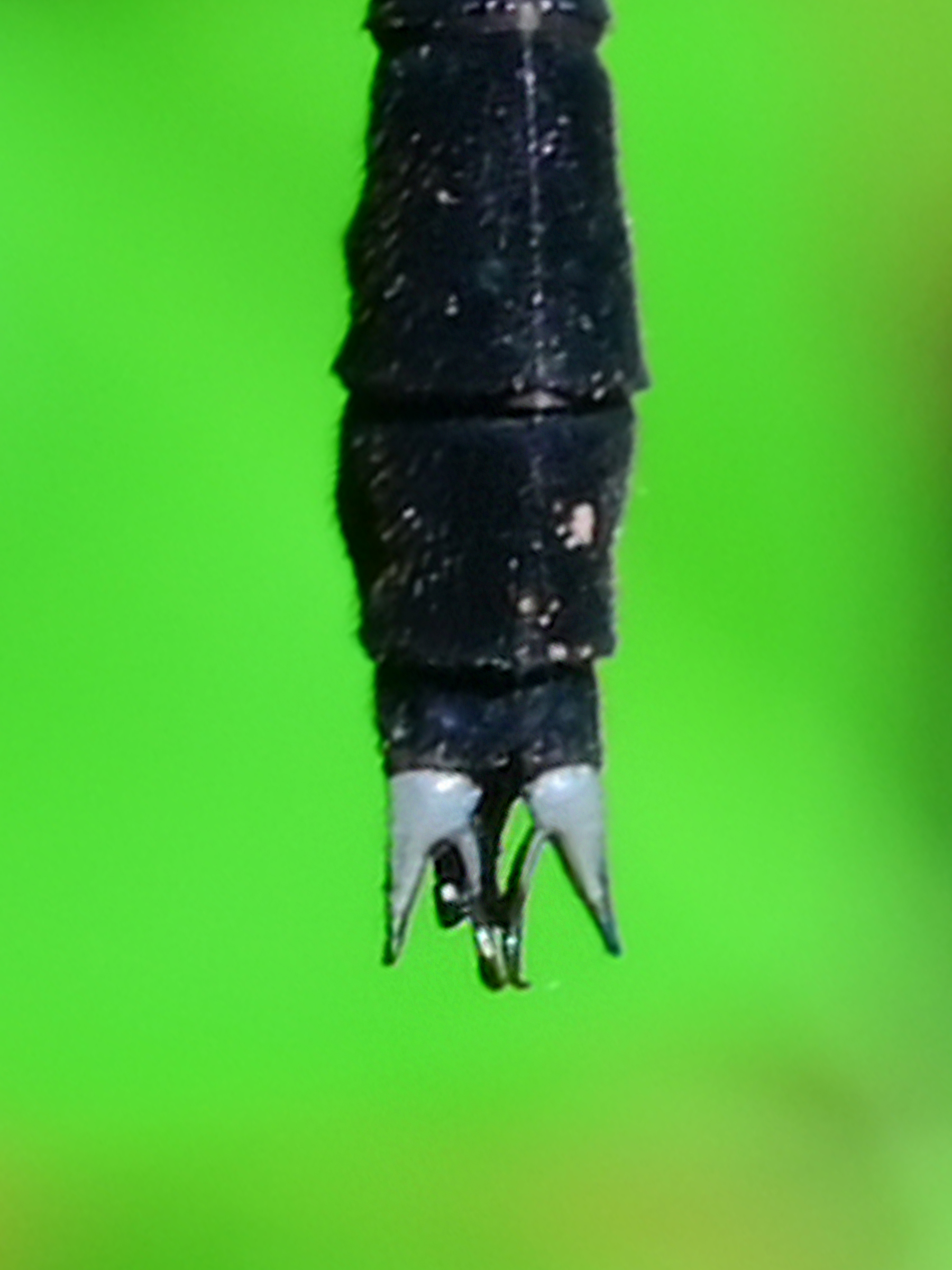
Appendages

==== Genus: Nychogomphus ====
===== Species: Nychogomphus striatus =====
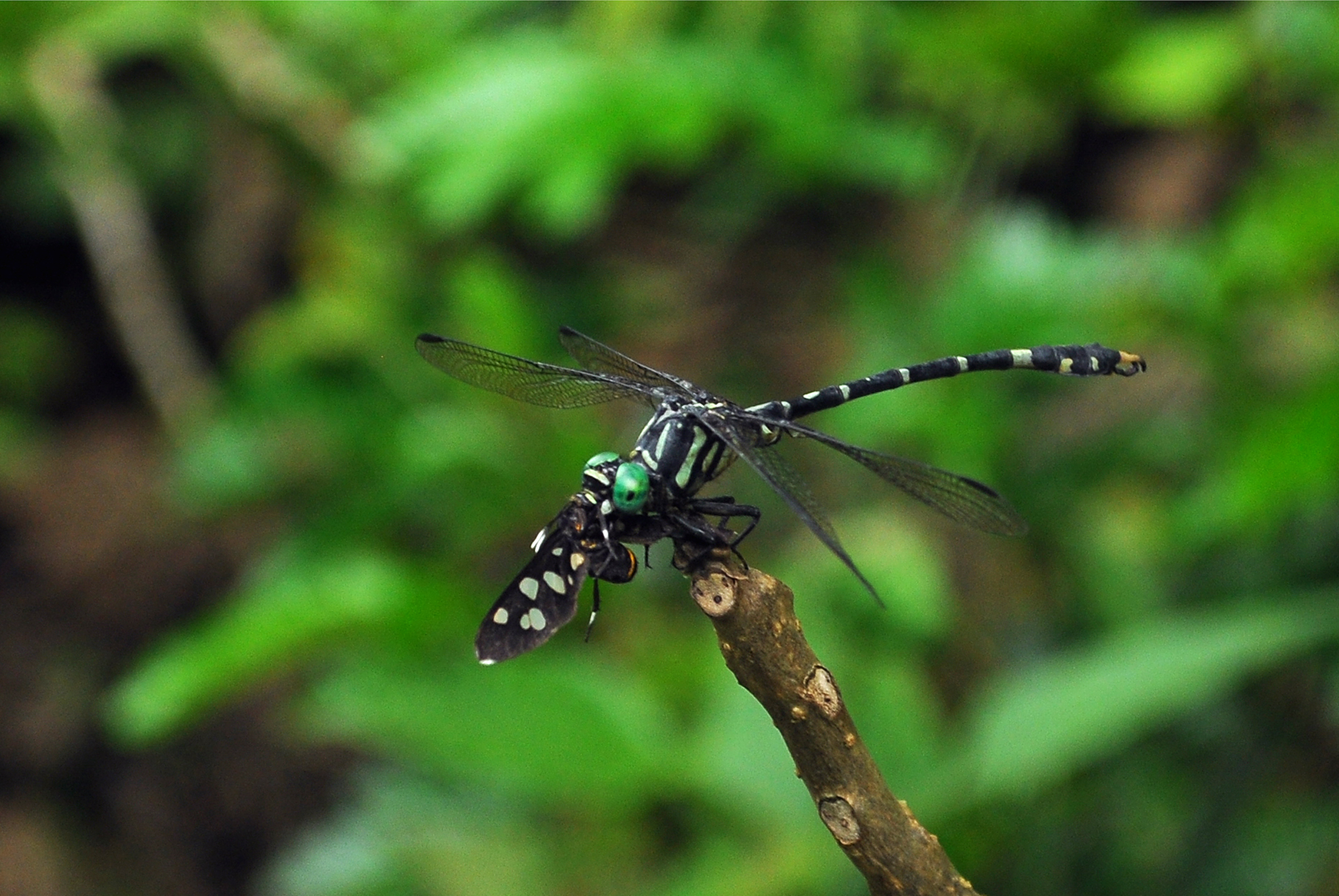
male

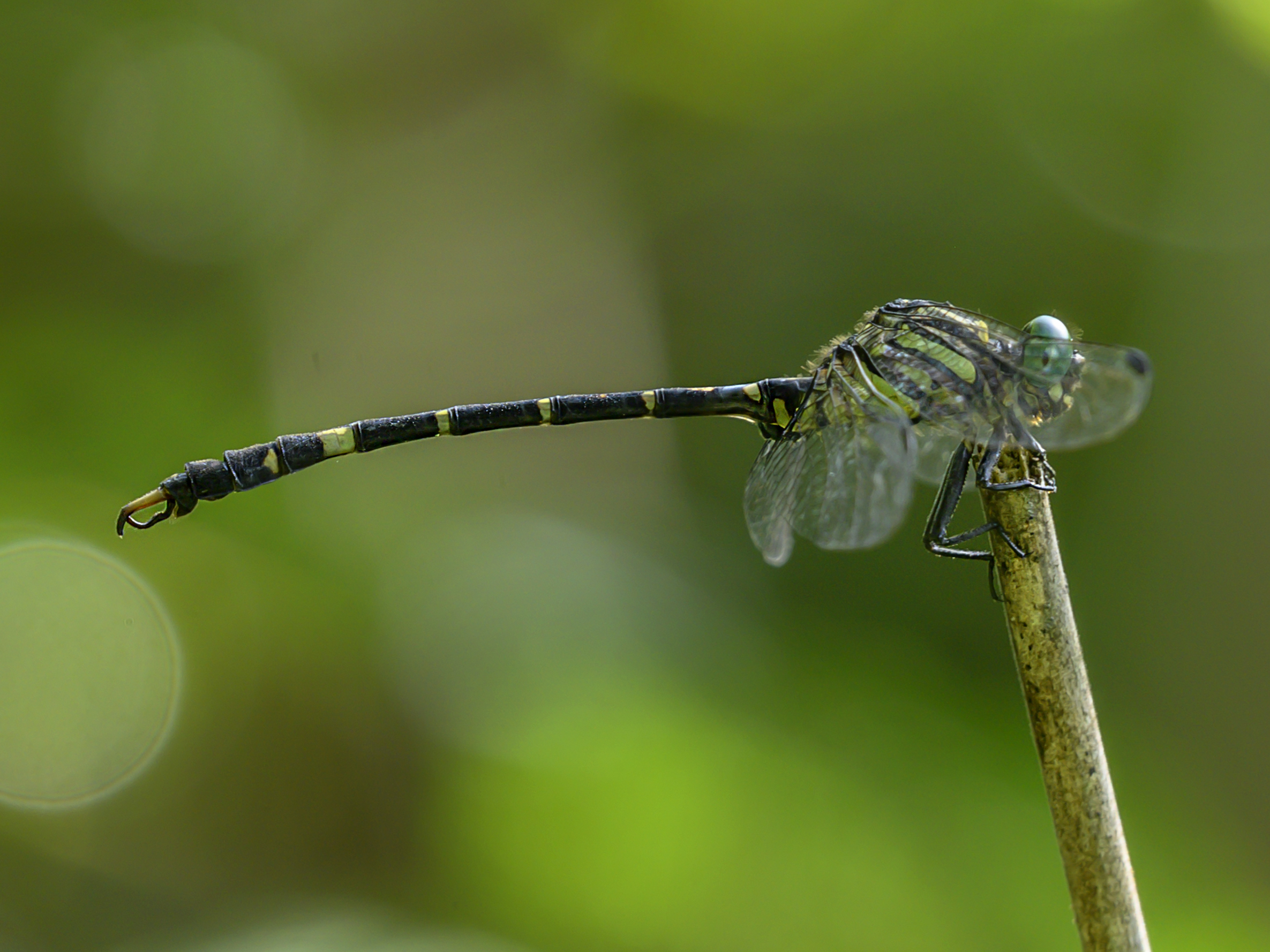
male

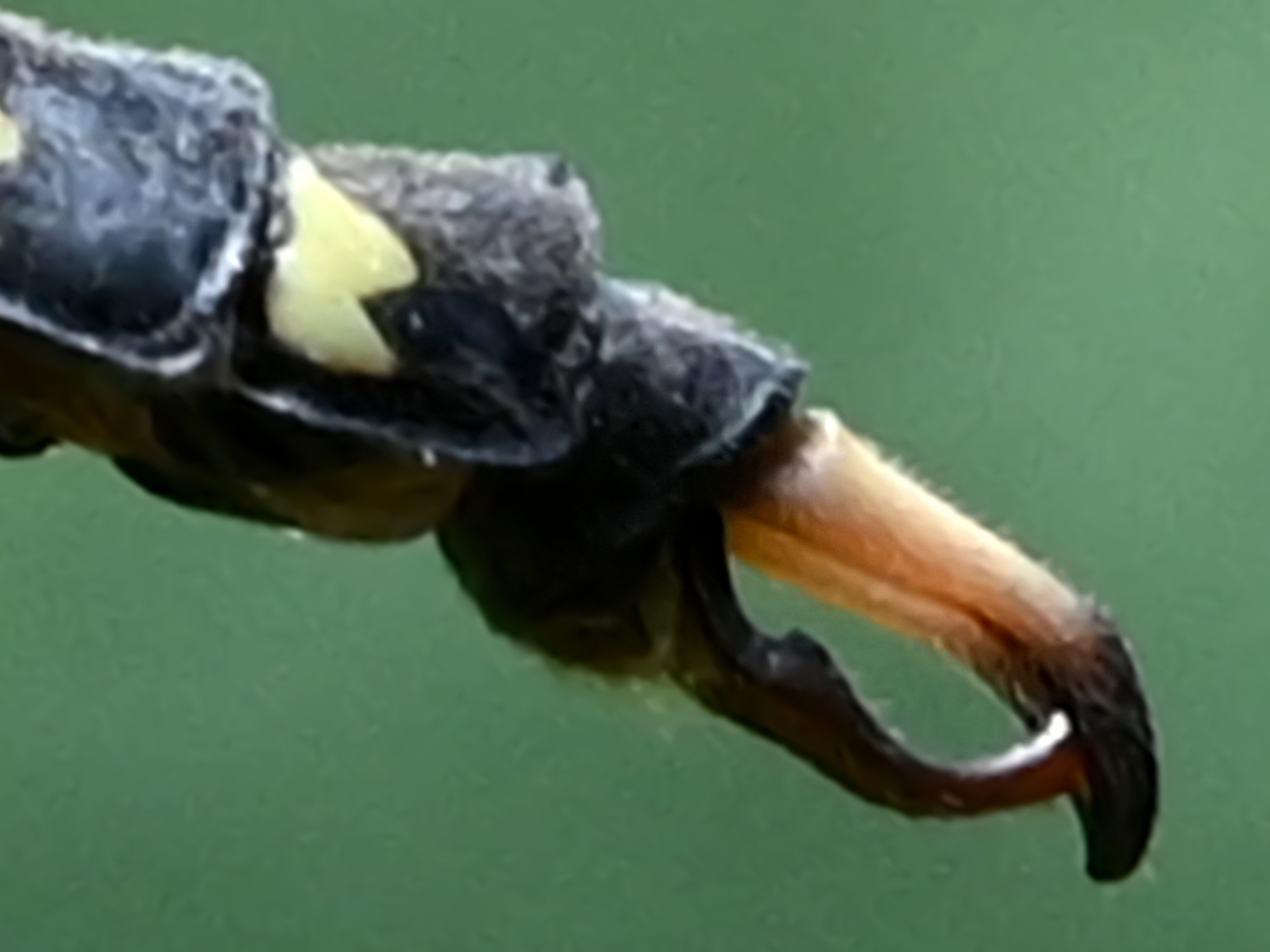
appendages

==== Genus: Paragomphus ====
===== Species: Paragomphus lineatus =====
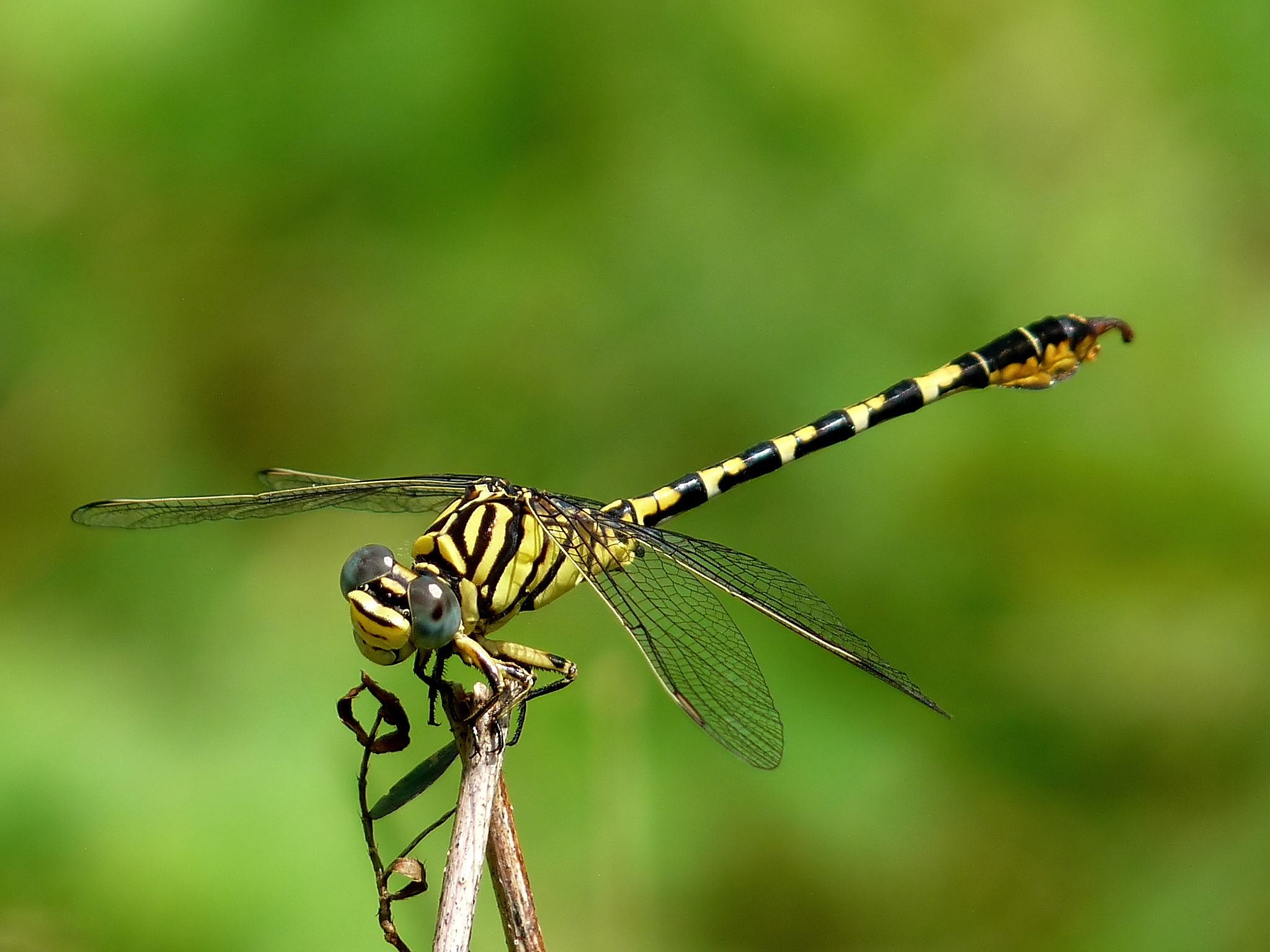
Paragomphus lineatus male

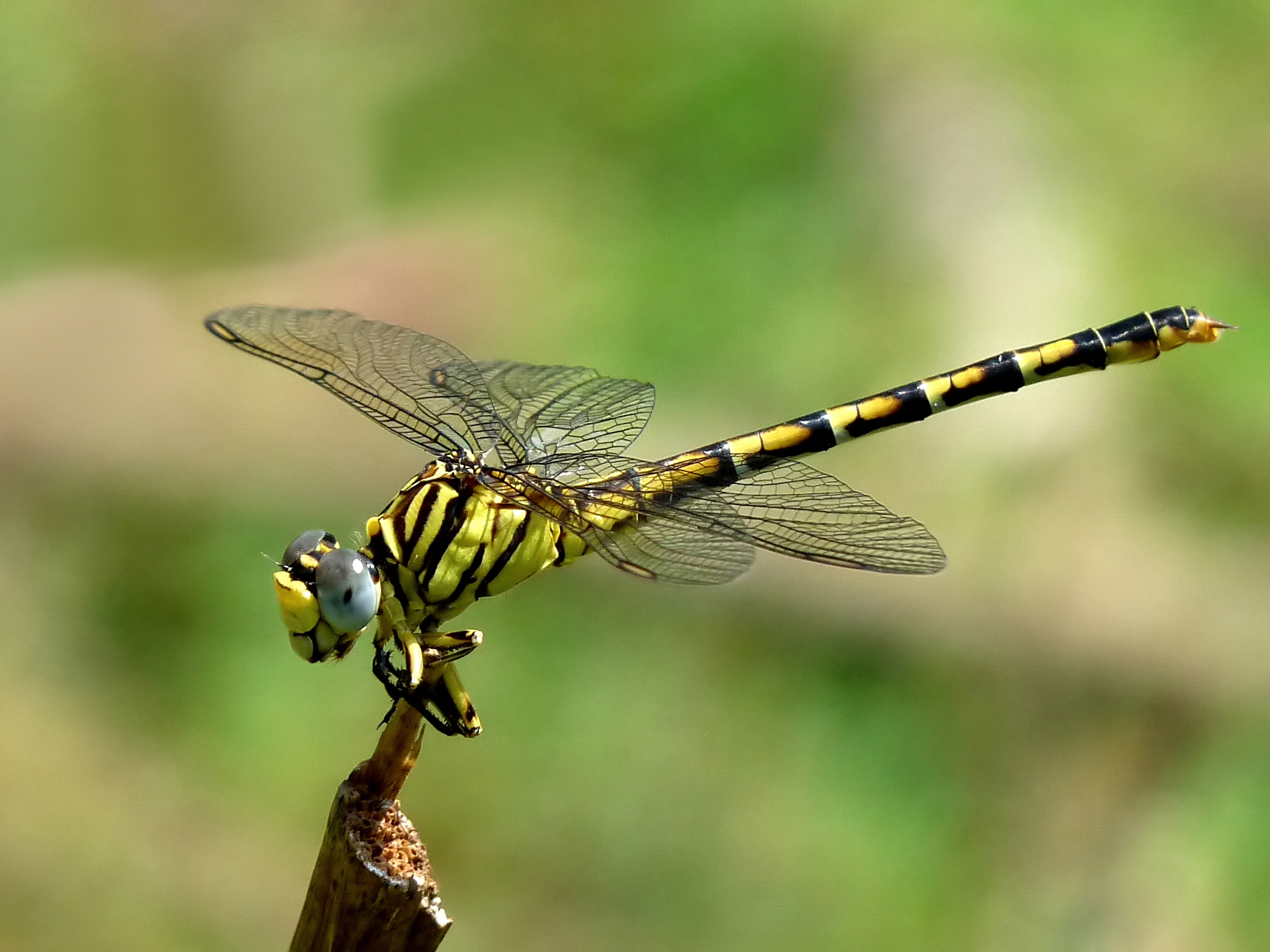
Paragomphus lineatus female

=== Family: Chlorogomphidae ===
==== Genus: Chlorogomphus ====
===== Species: Chlorogomphus campioni =====
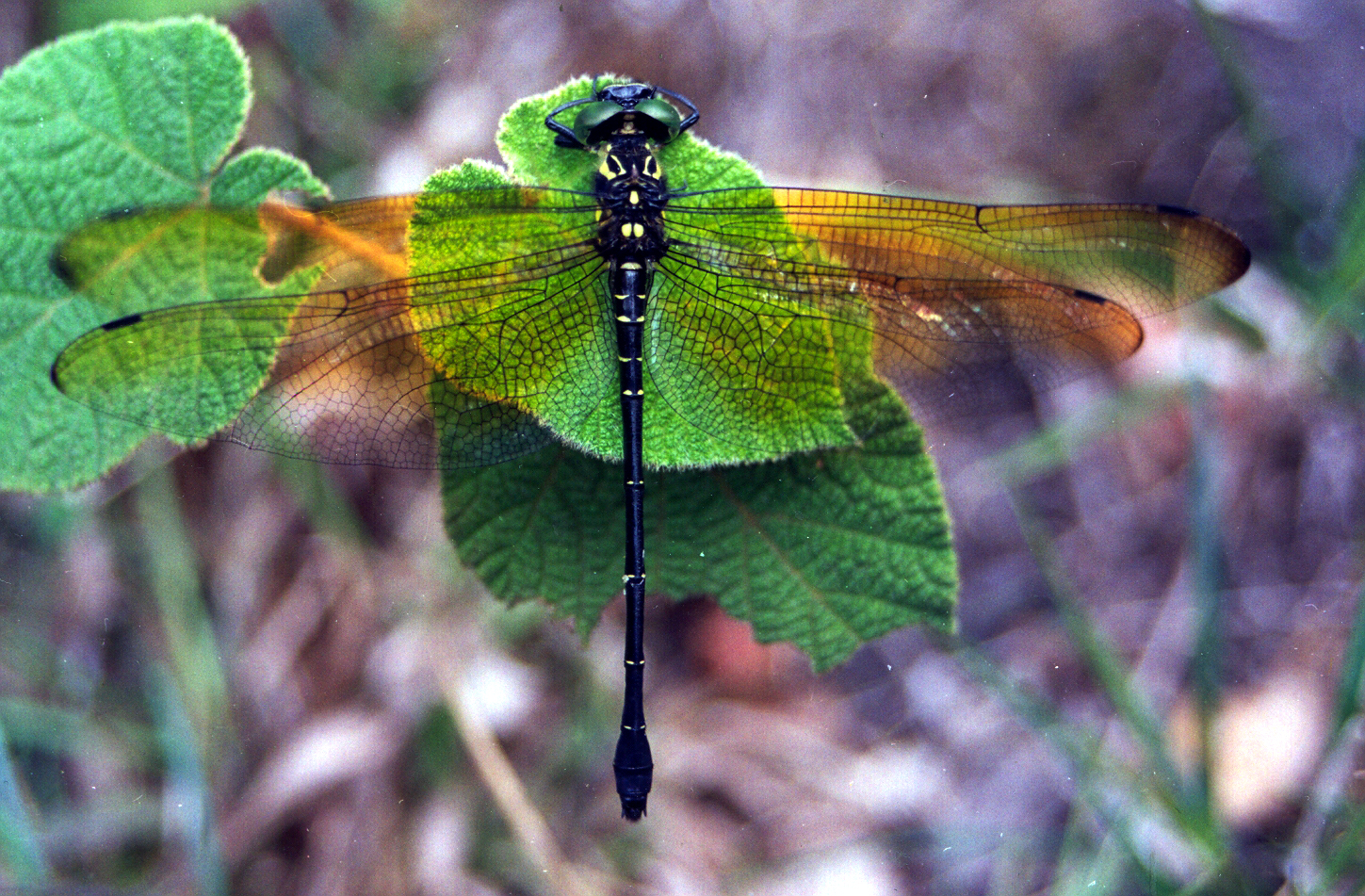
Male

===== Species: Chlorogomphus xanthoptera =====
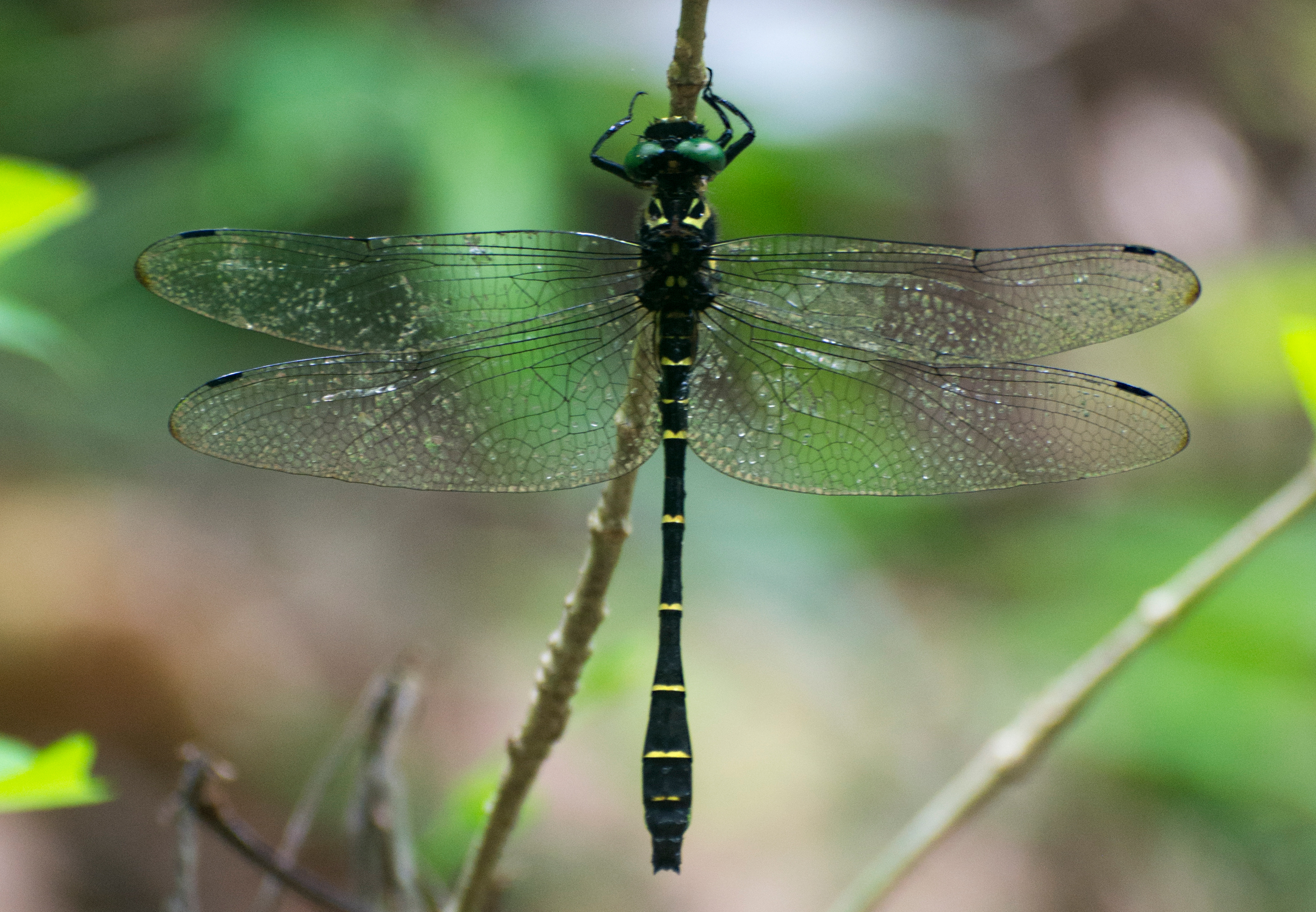
Male

=== Family: Macromiidae (Cruisers) ===
==== Genus: Epophthalmia ====
===== Species: Epophthalmia frontalis =====
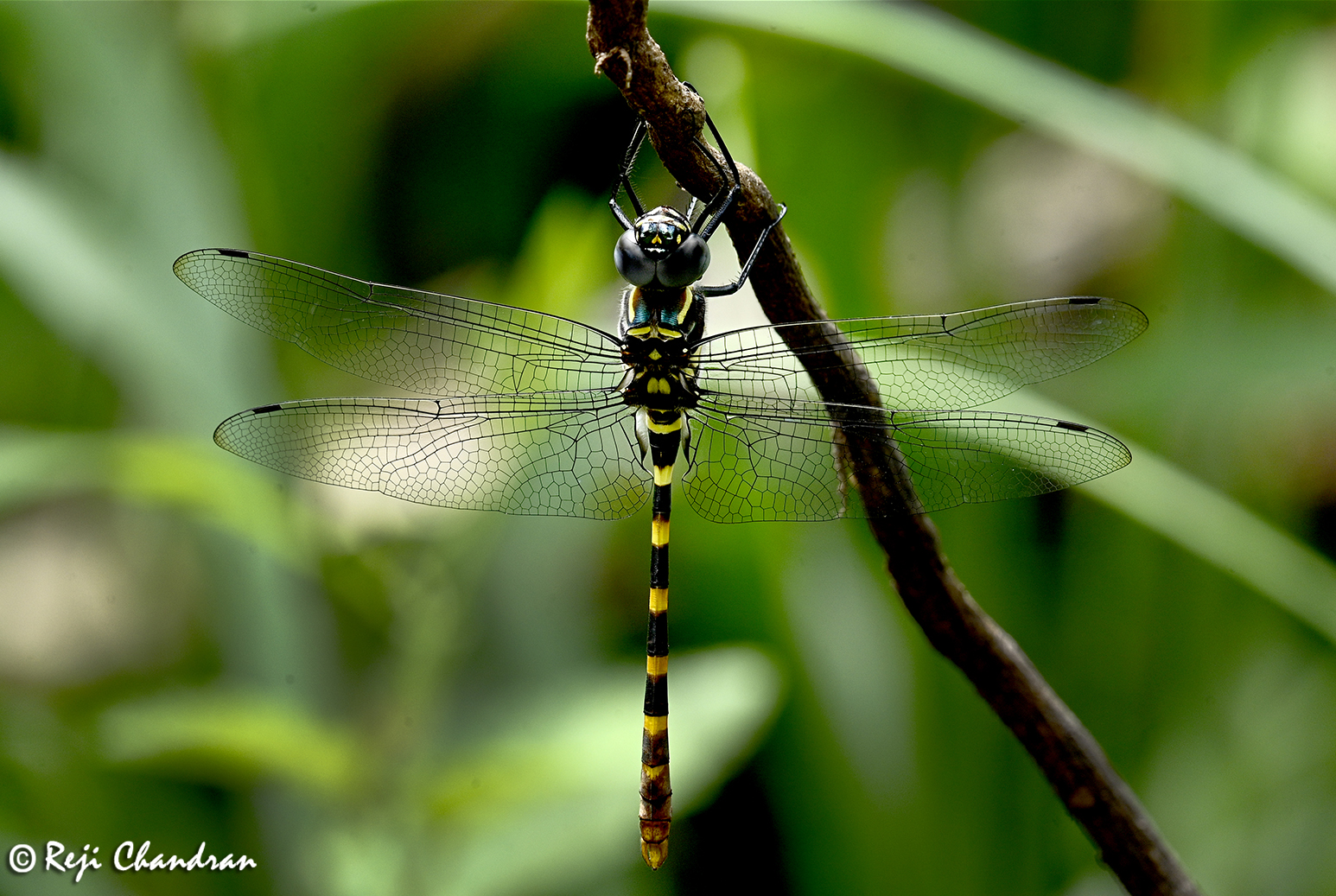
male

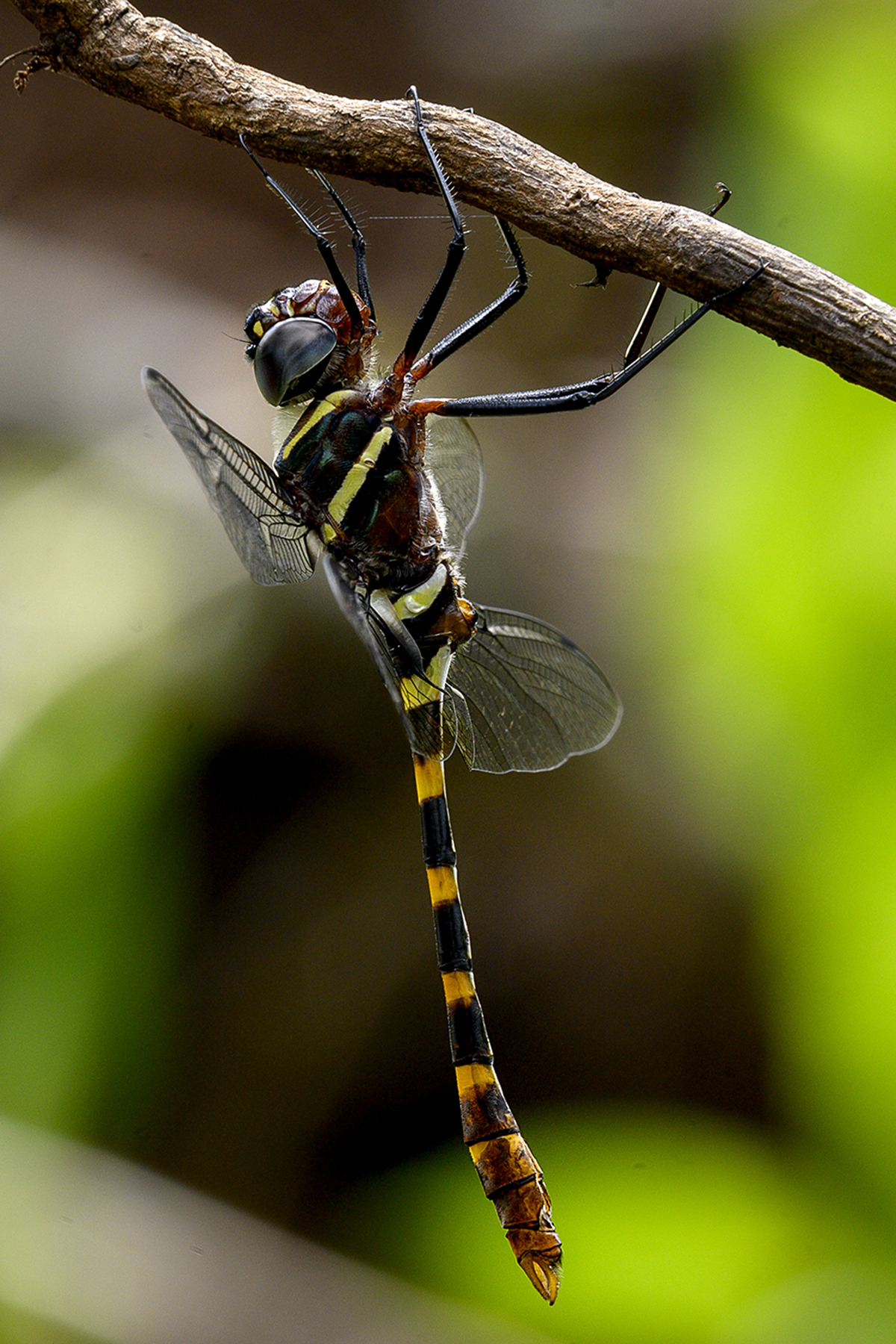
male

===== Species: Epophthalmia vittata =====
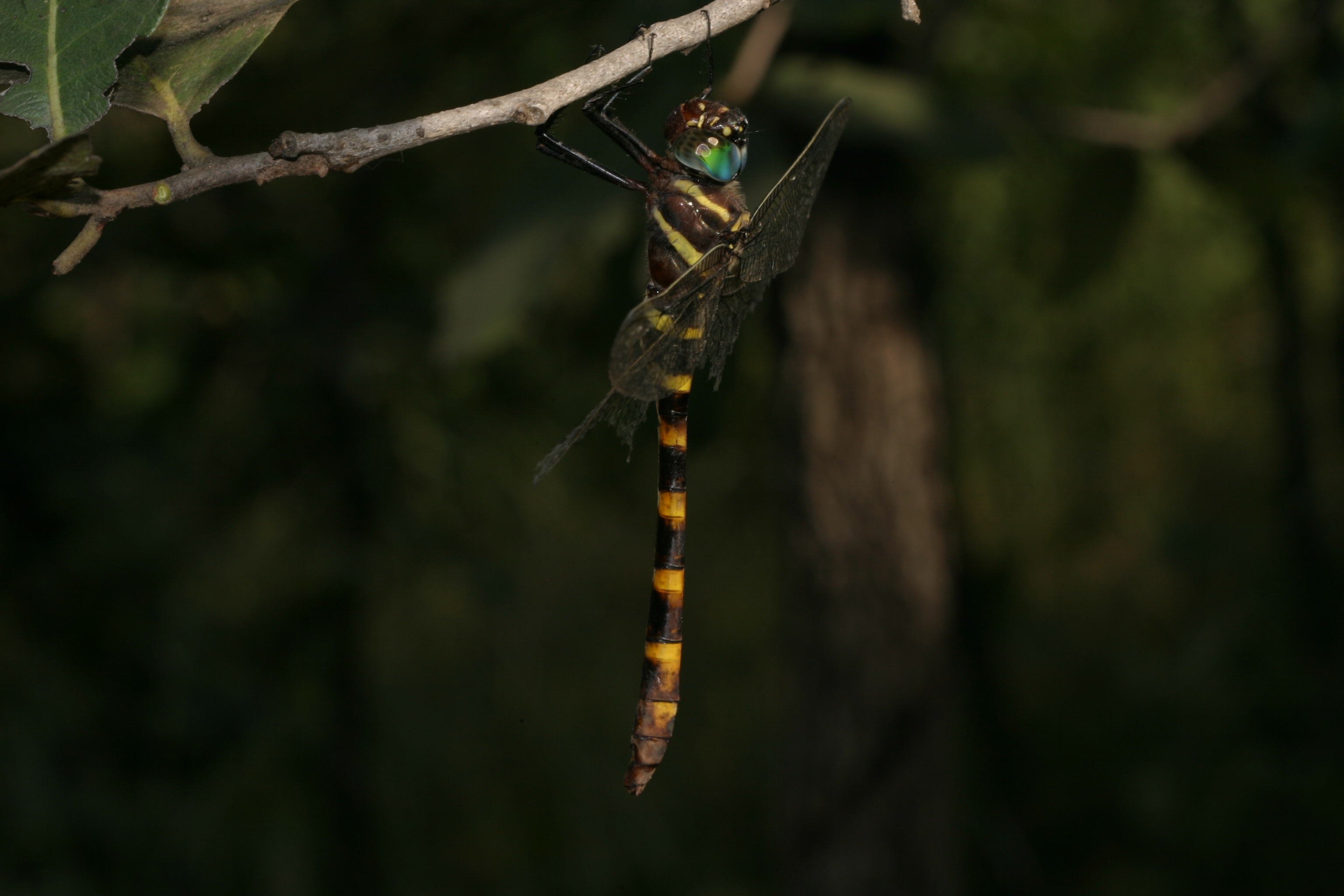
Epophthalmia vittata male

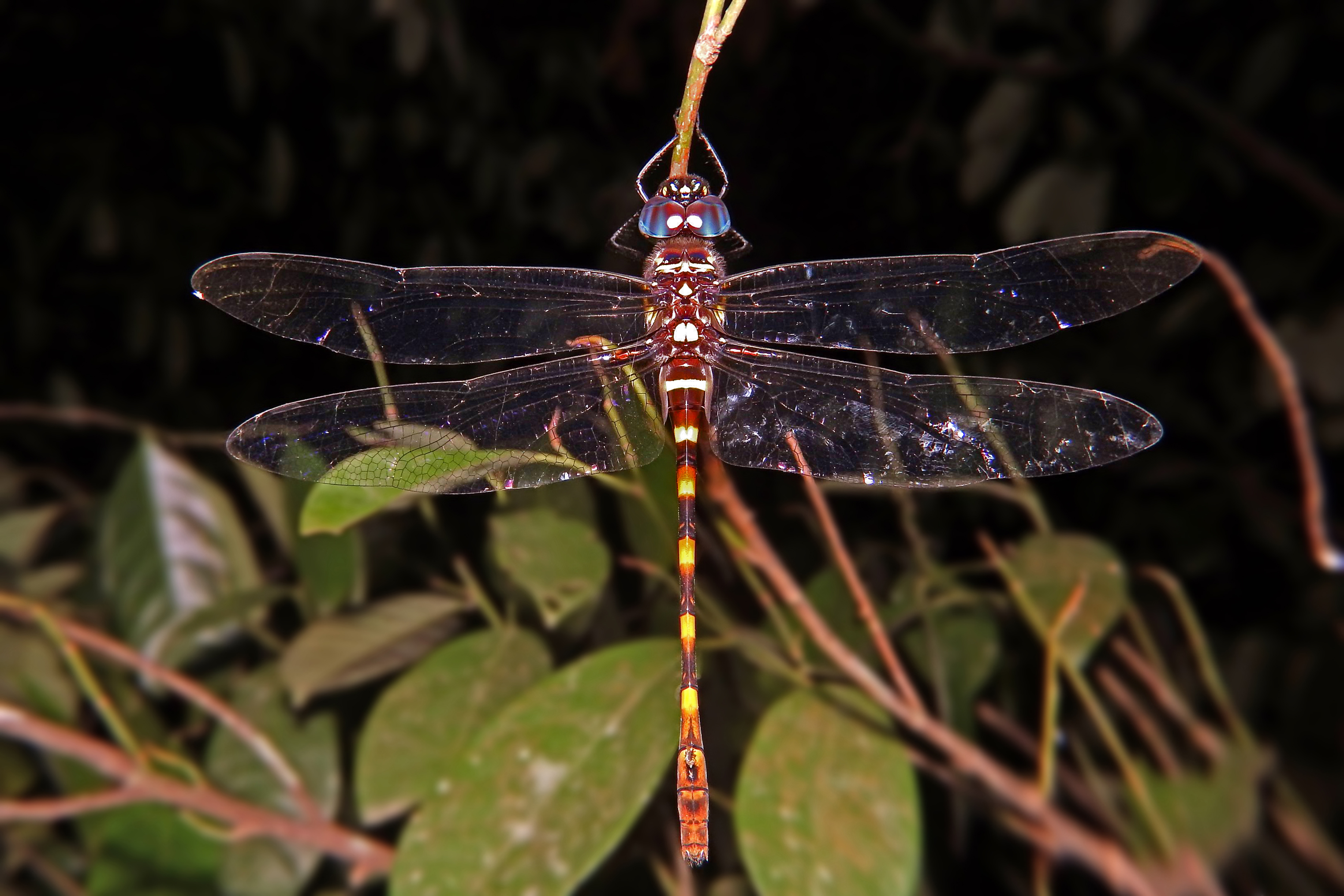
female

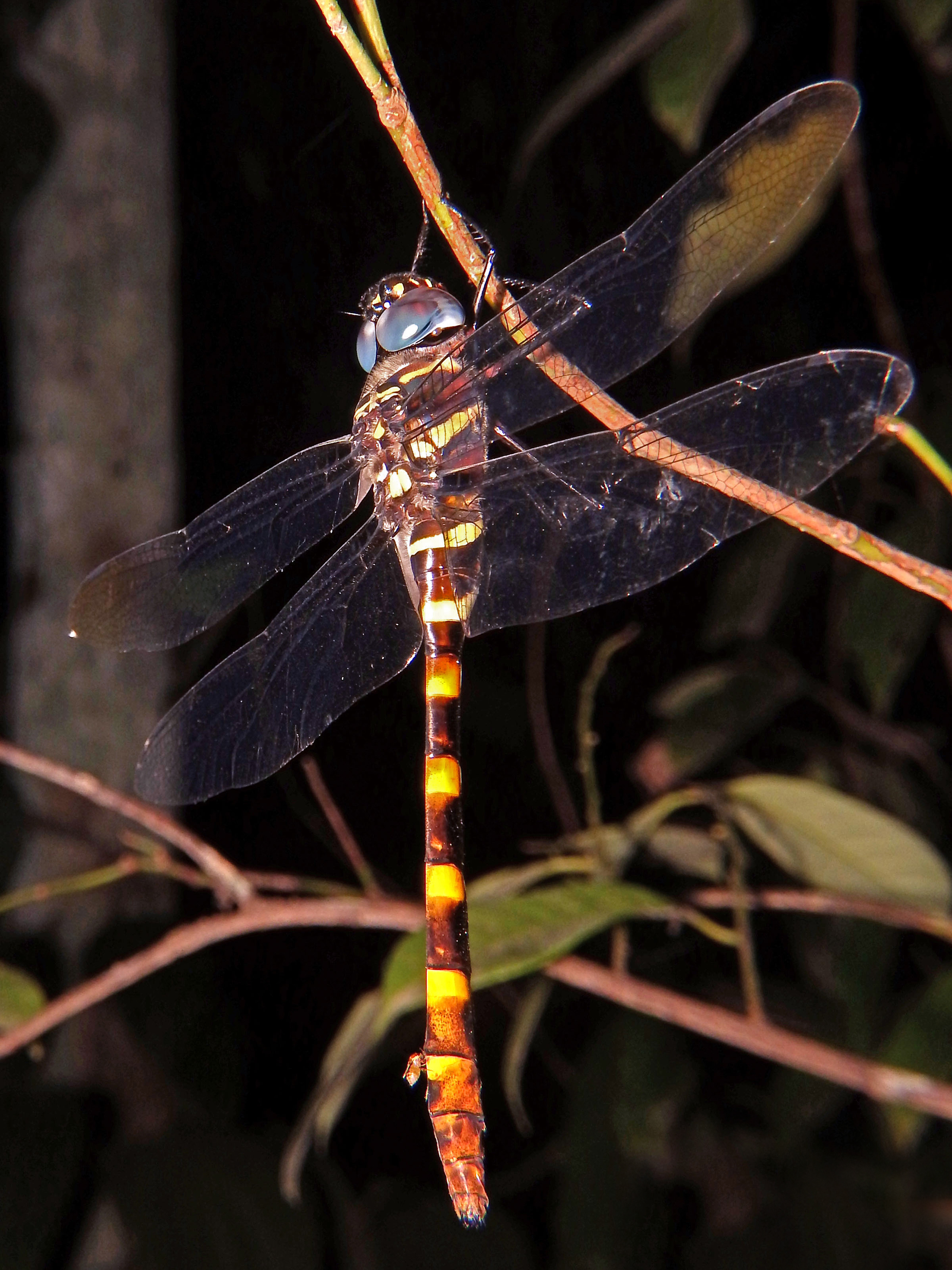
female

==== Genus: Macromia ====
===== Species: Macromia annaimallaiensis =====
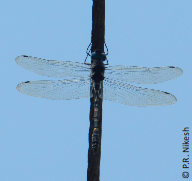
male

===== Species: Macromia bellicosa =====
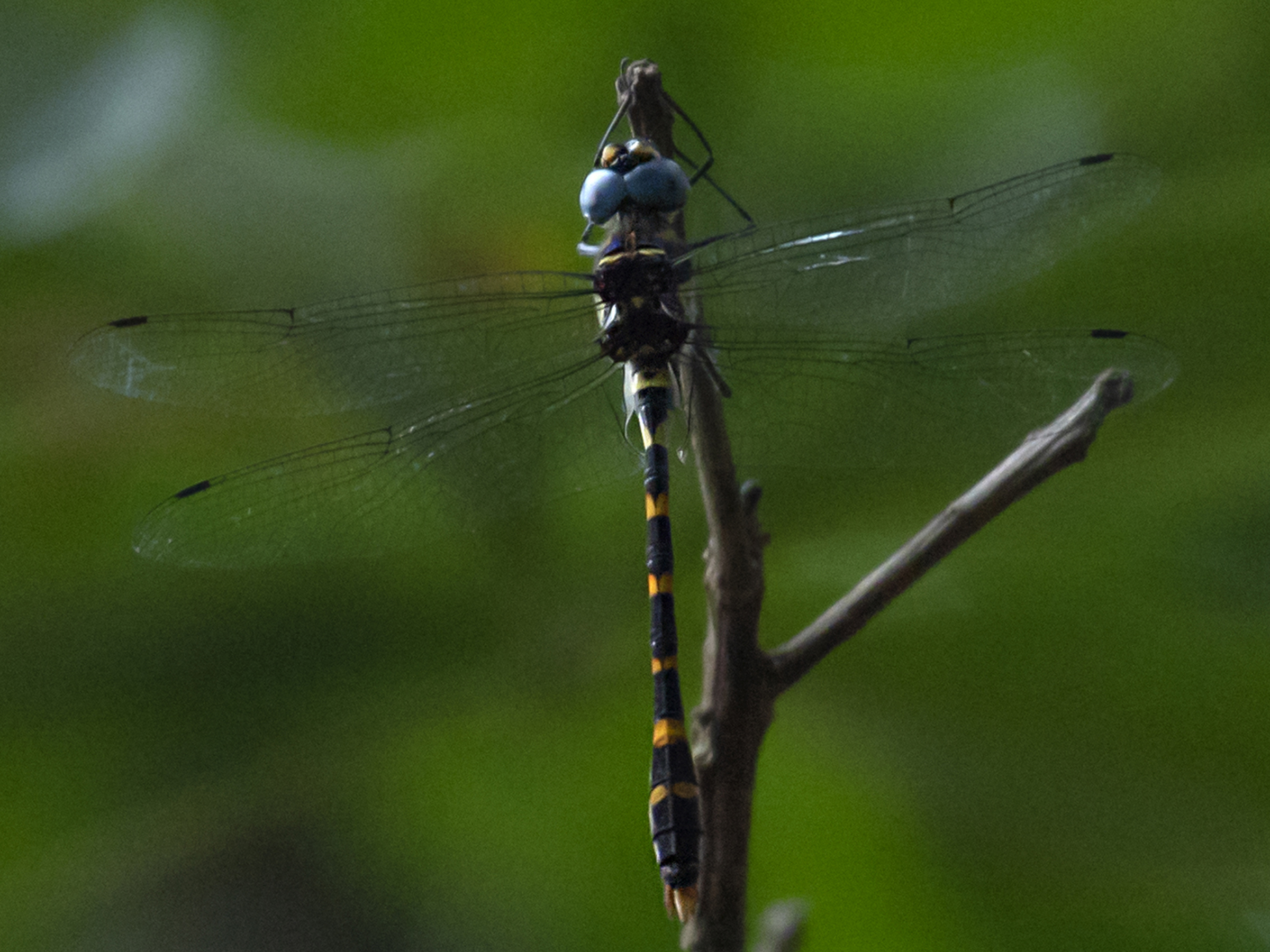
male

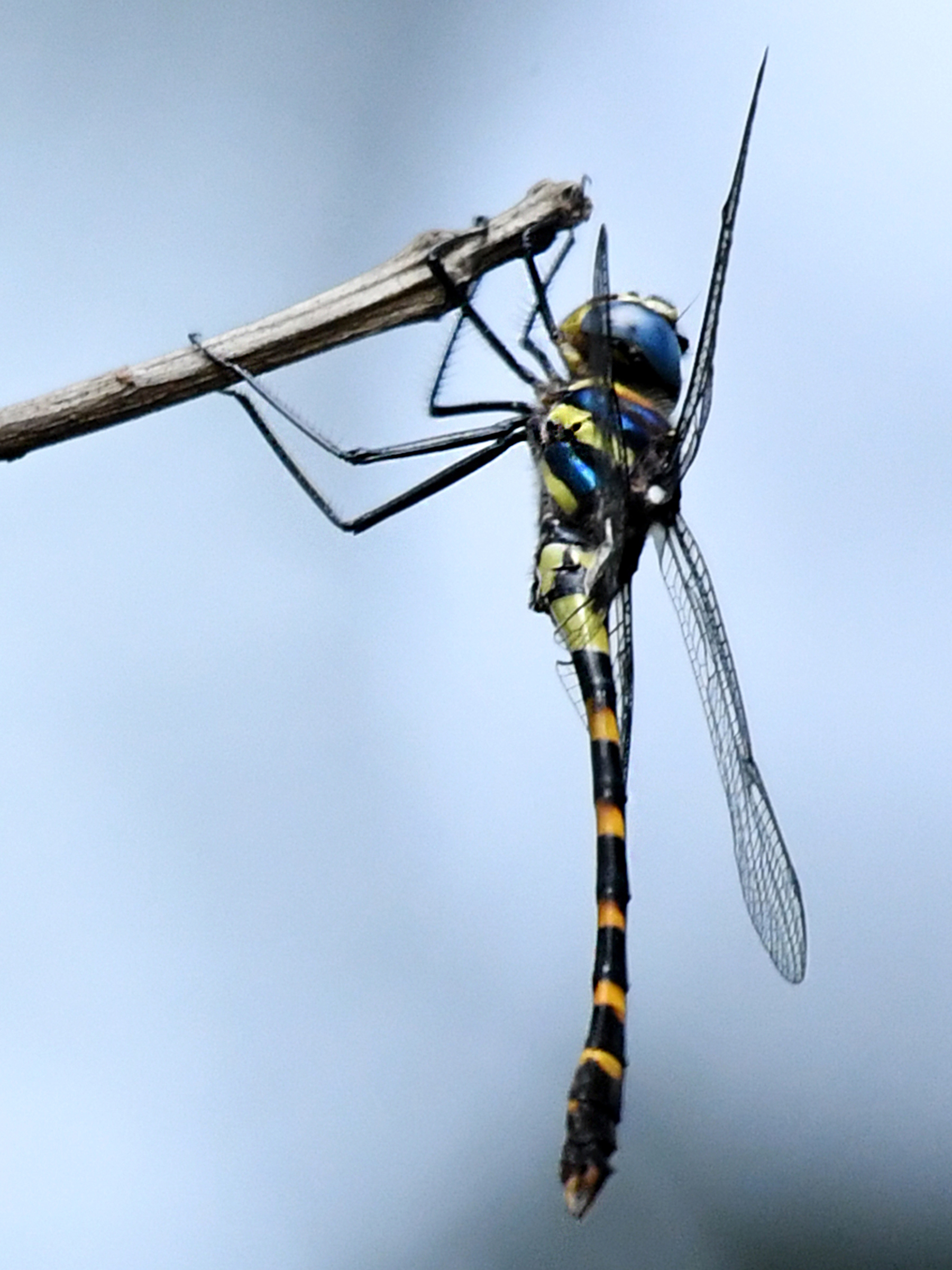
male

===== Species: Macromia cingulata =====
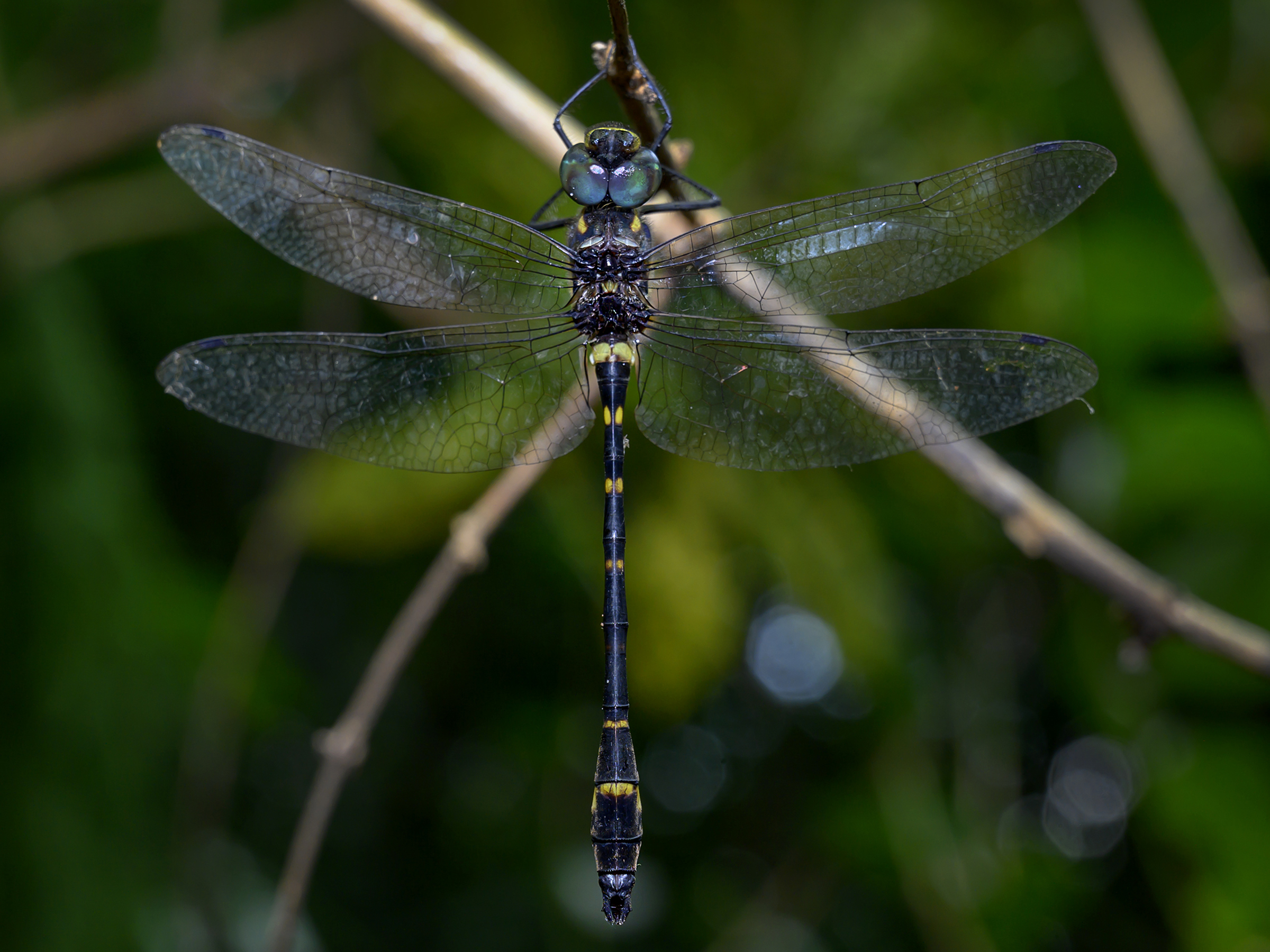
male

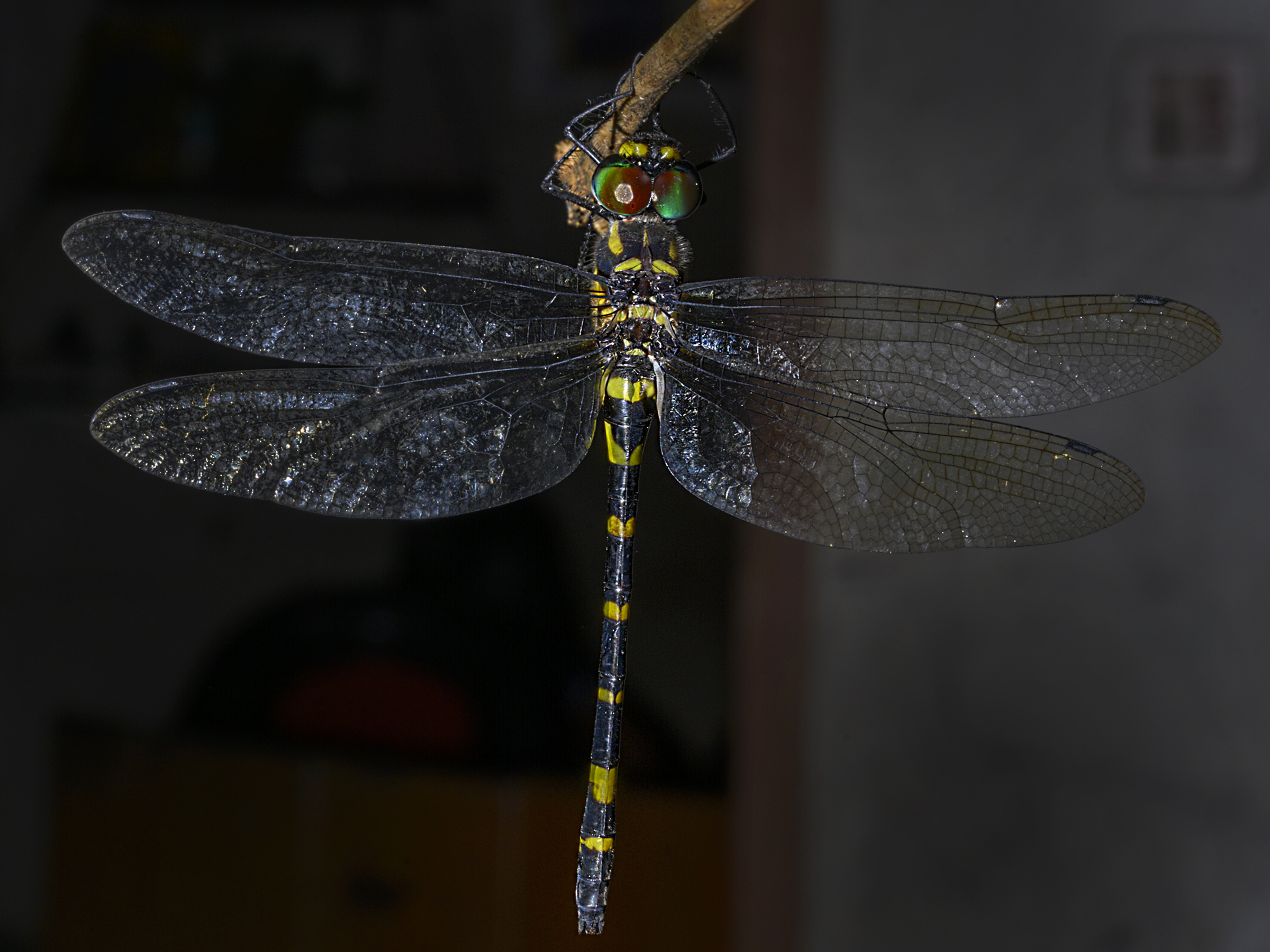
female

===== Species: Macromia ellisoni =====
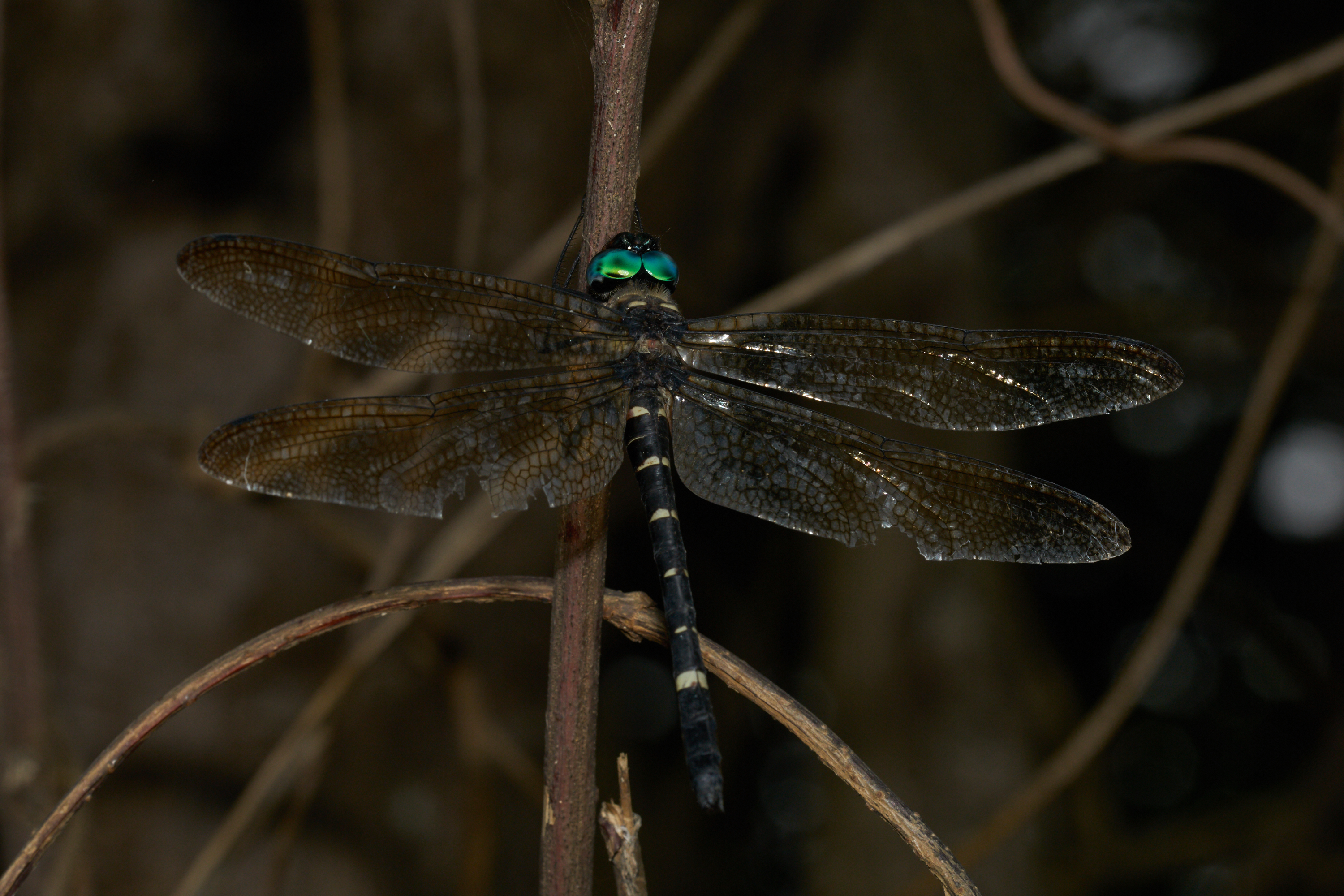
Macromia ellisoni male

===== Species: Macromia flavocolorata =====
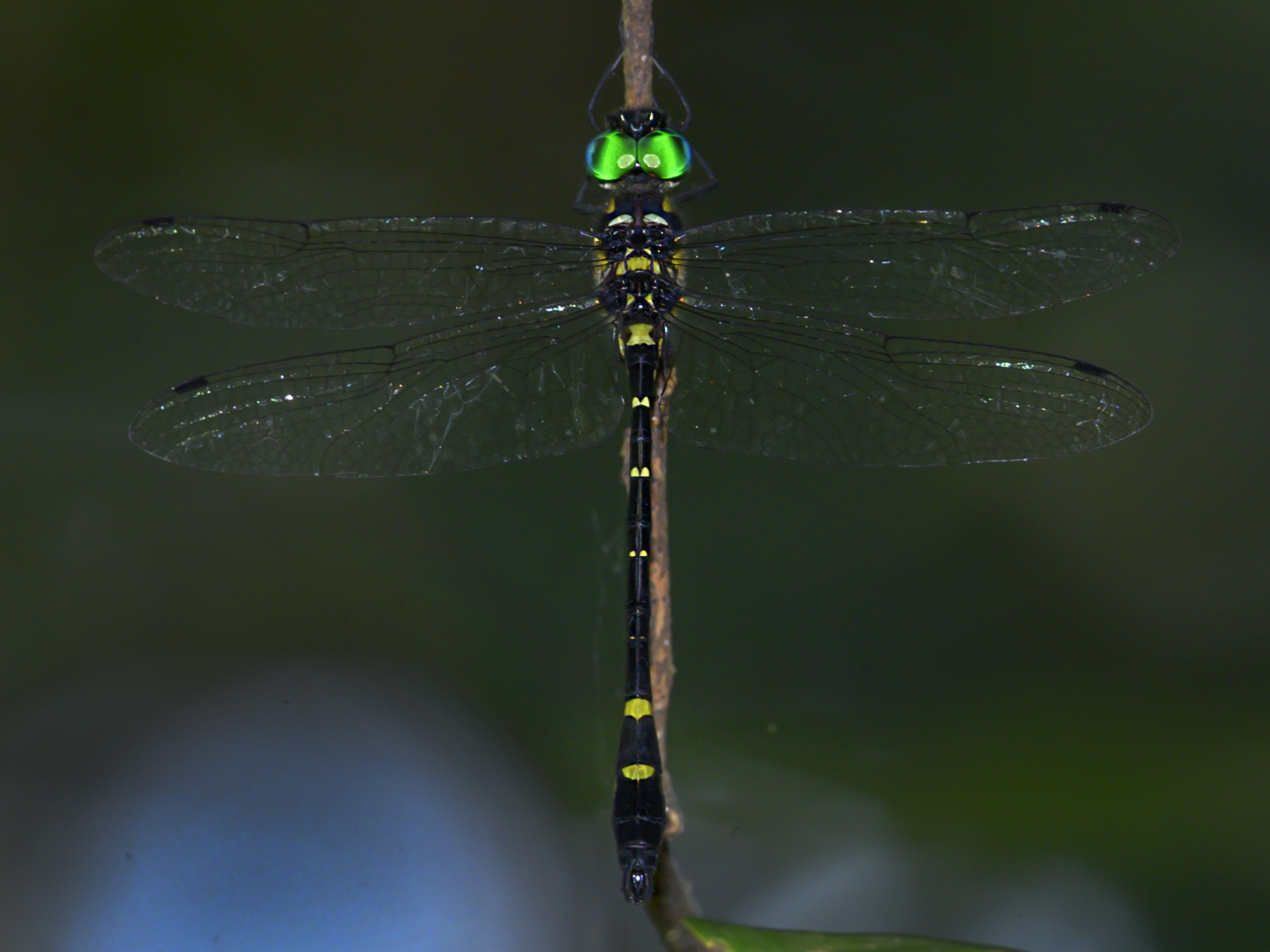
Male

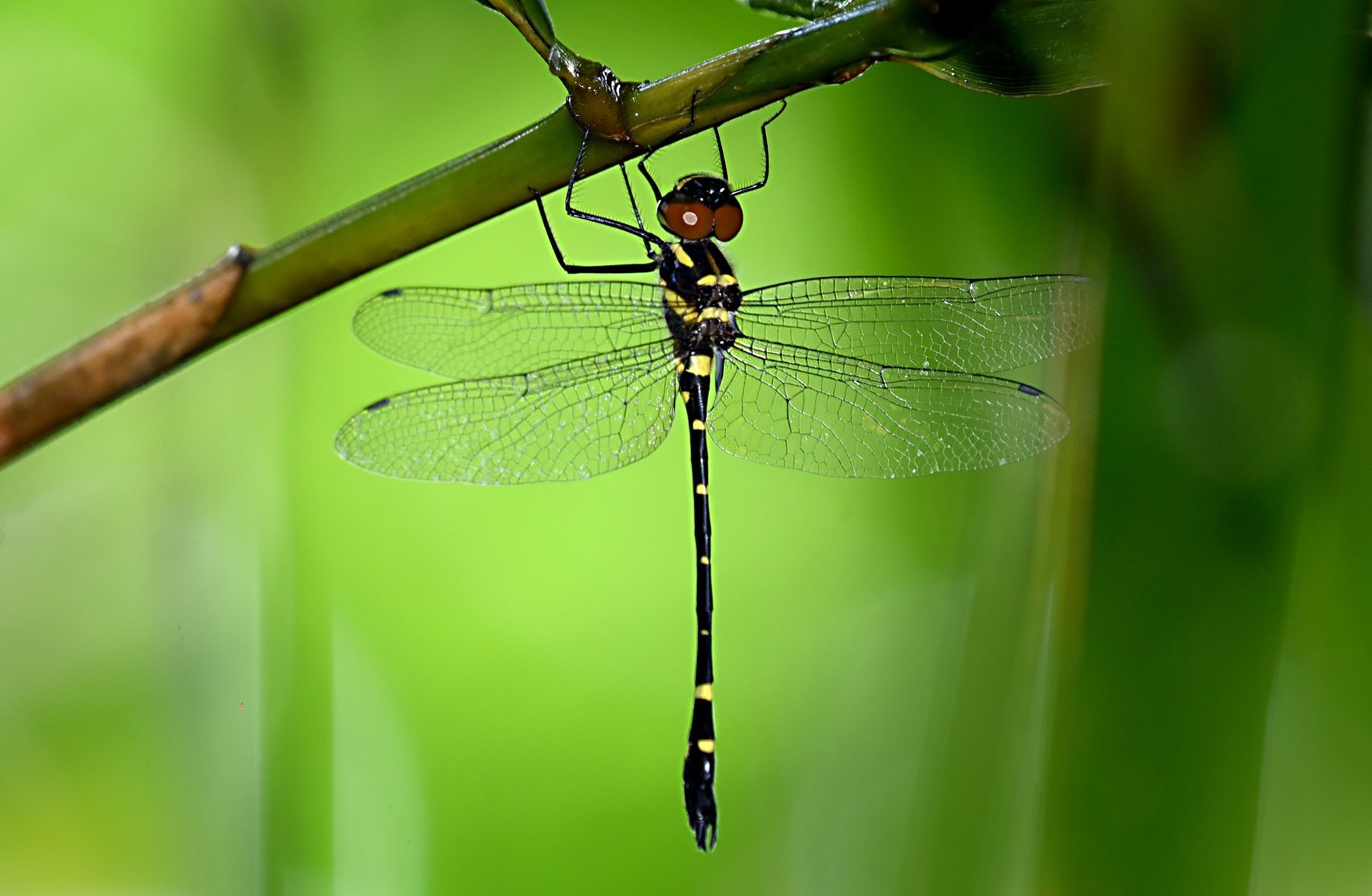
Male

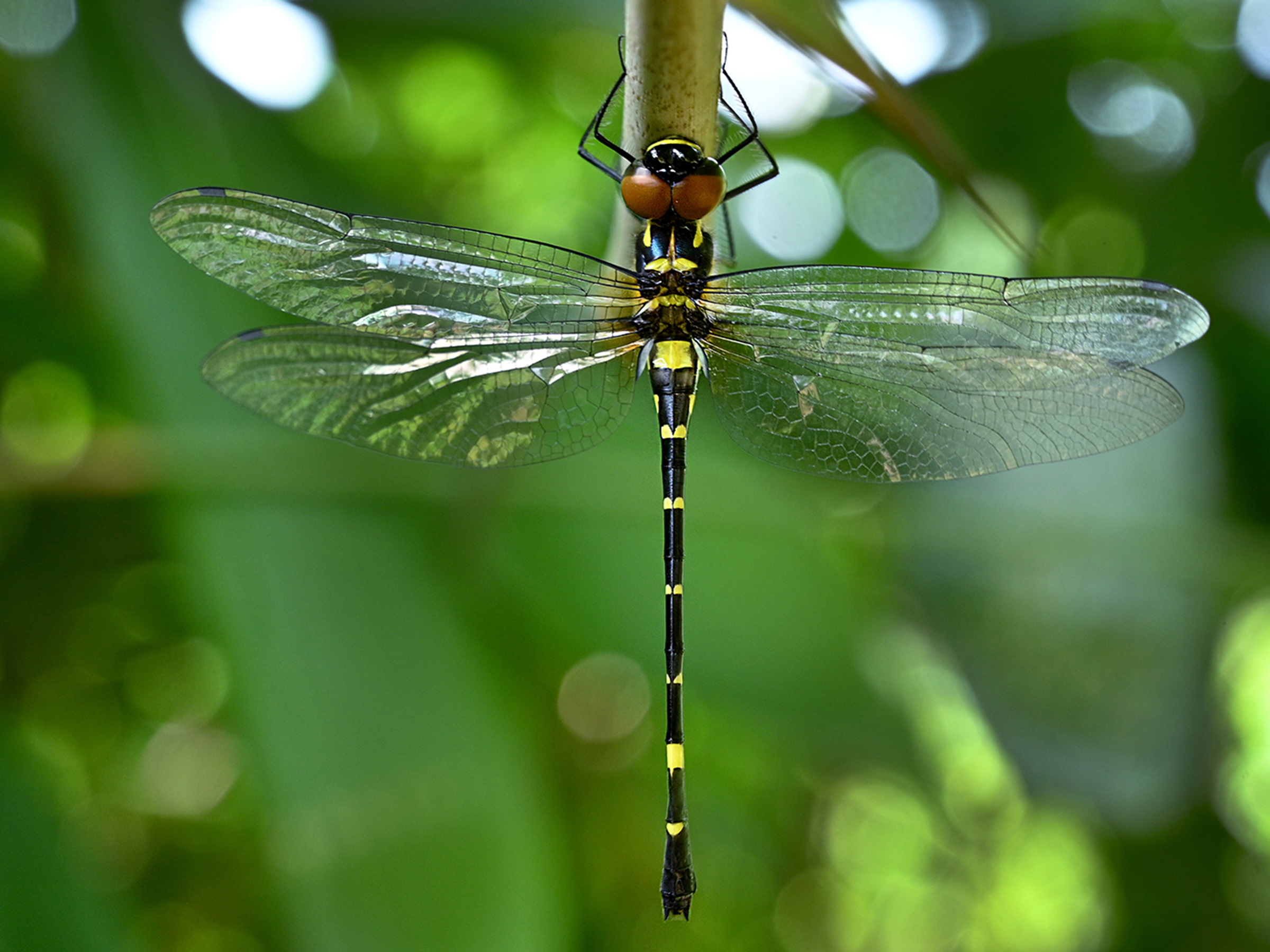
Female

===== Species: Macromia ida =====
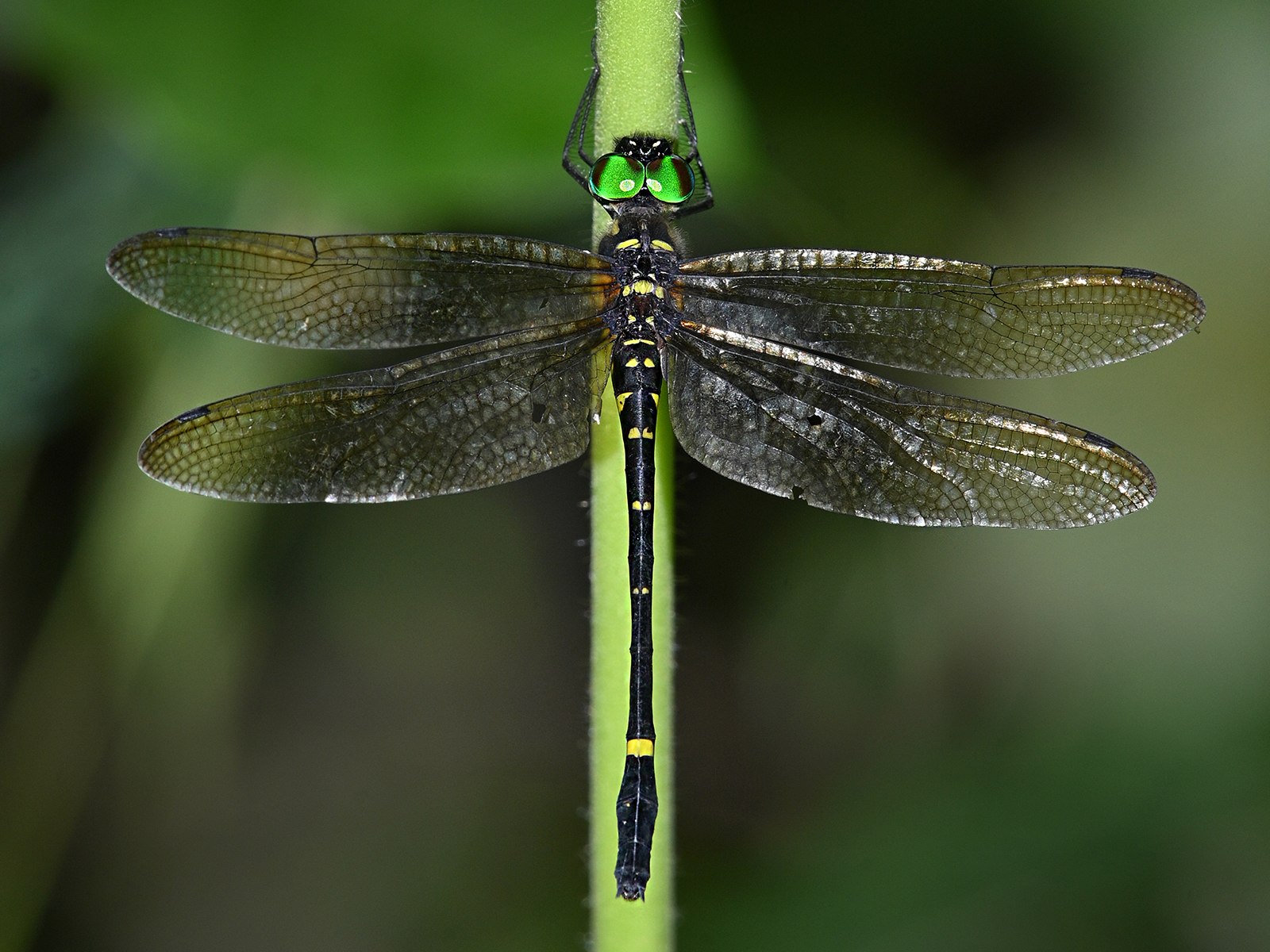

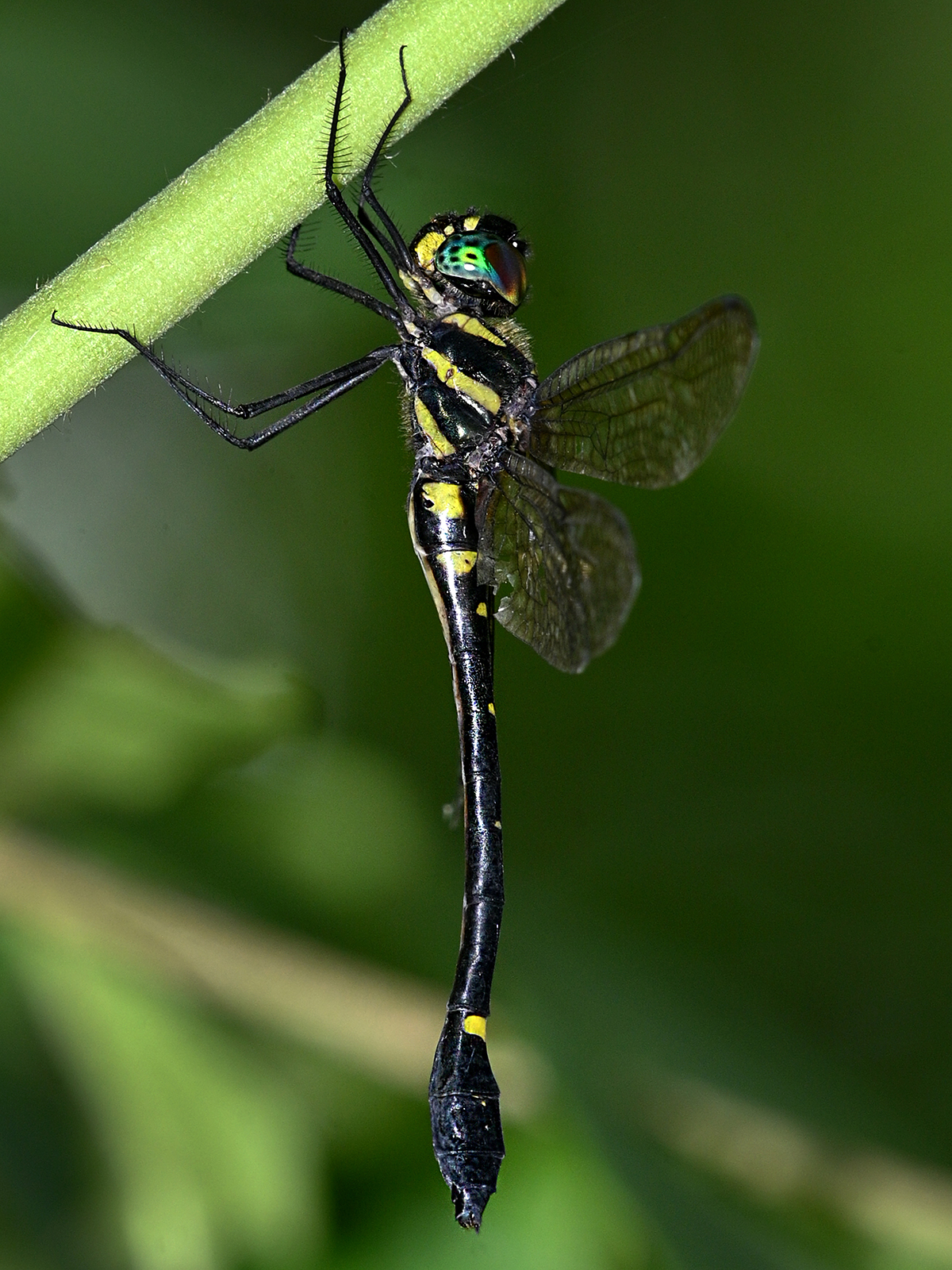

===== Species: Macromia irata =====
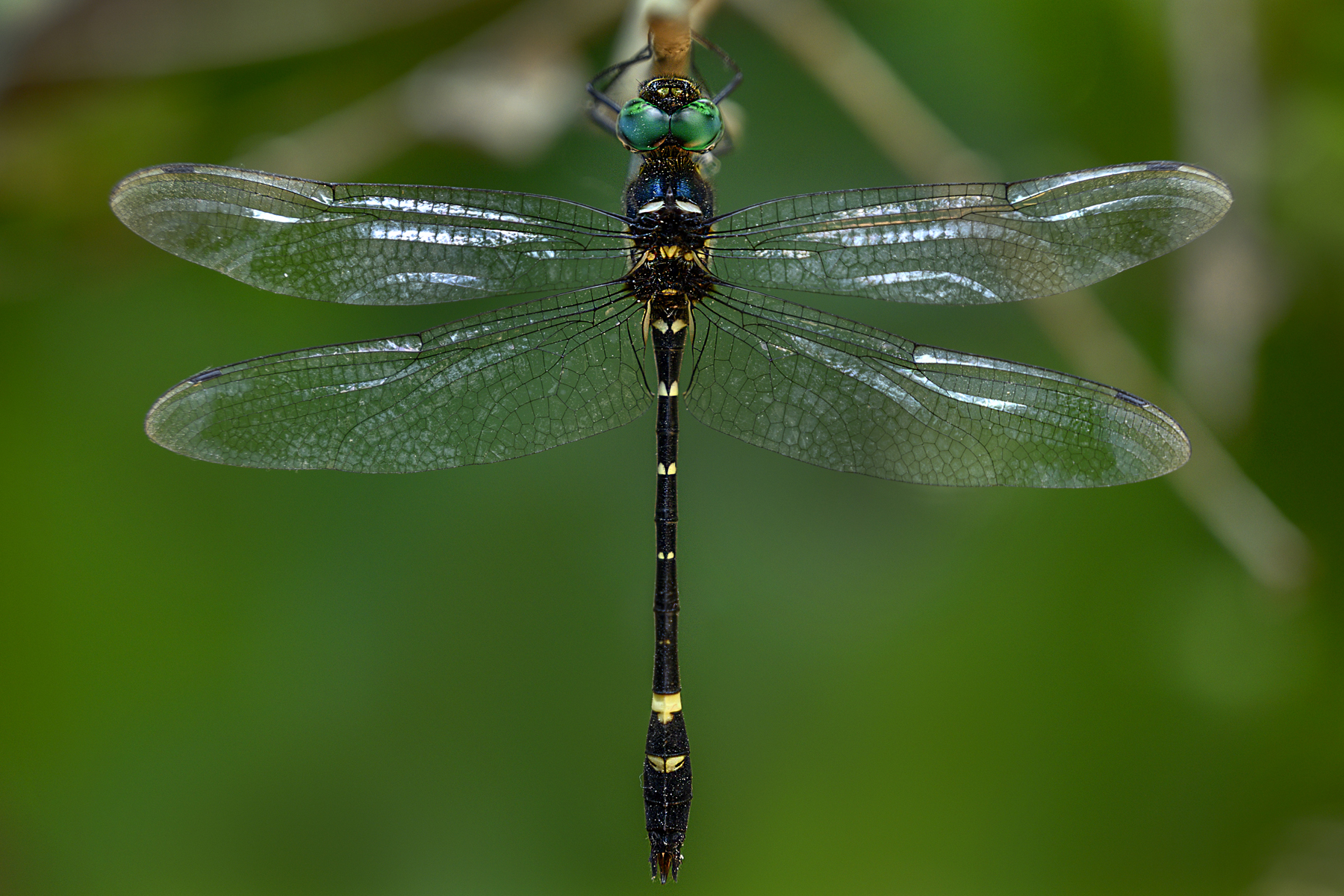
Dorsal view (male)

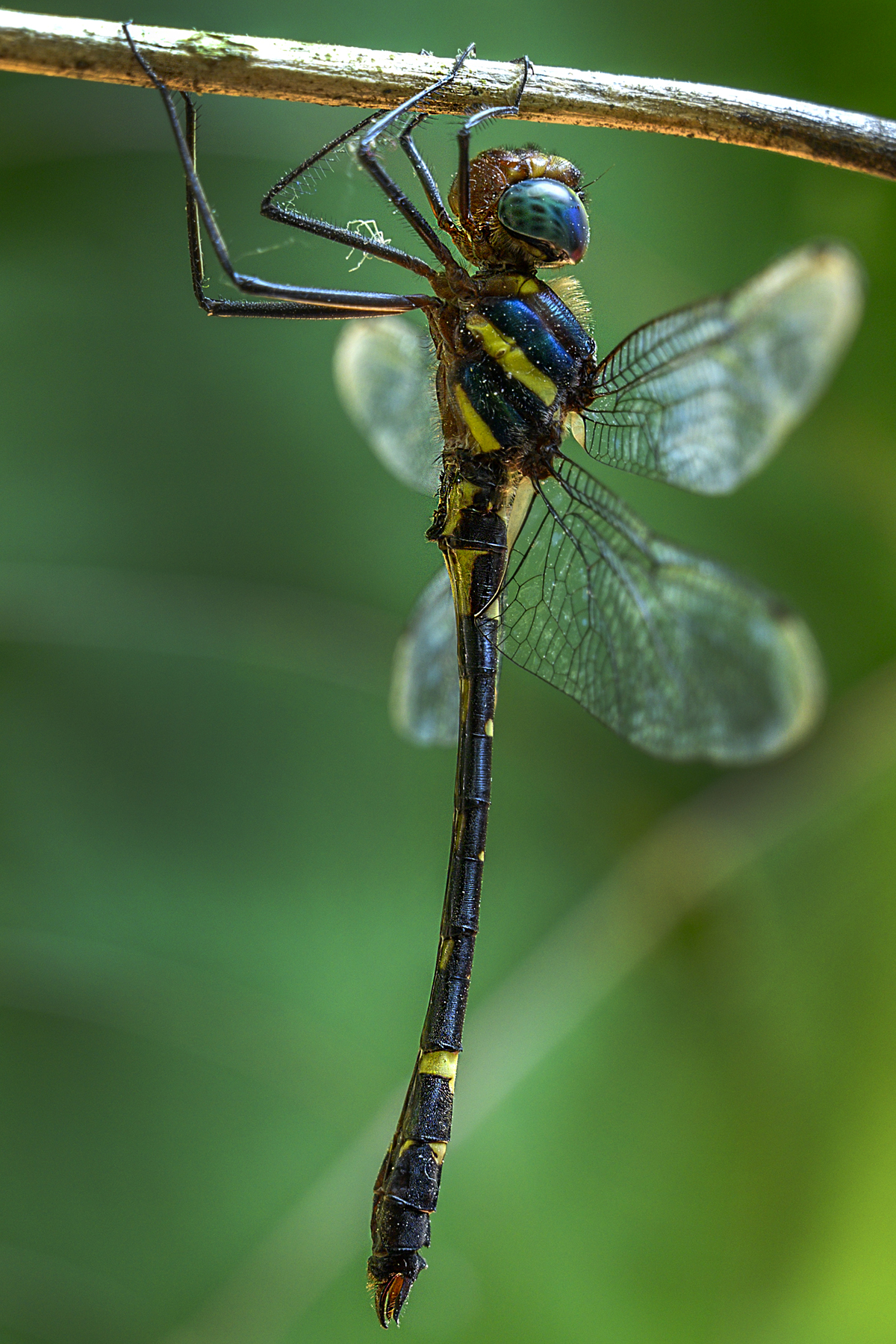
Lateral view (male)

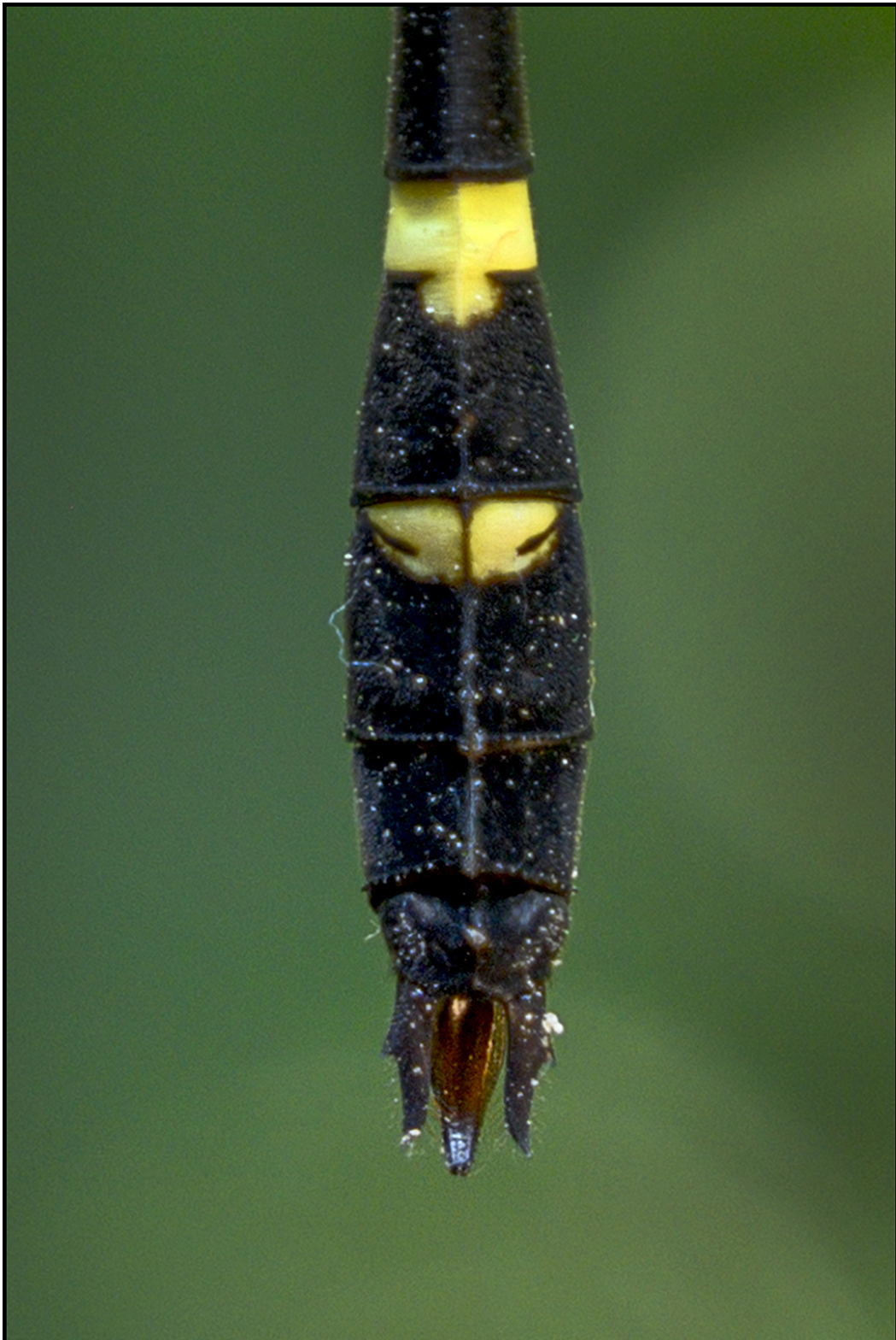
Anal appendages

=== Family: Corduliidae (Emeralds or Baskettails) ===
==== Genus: Hemicordulia ====
===== Species: Hemicordulia asiatica =====
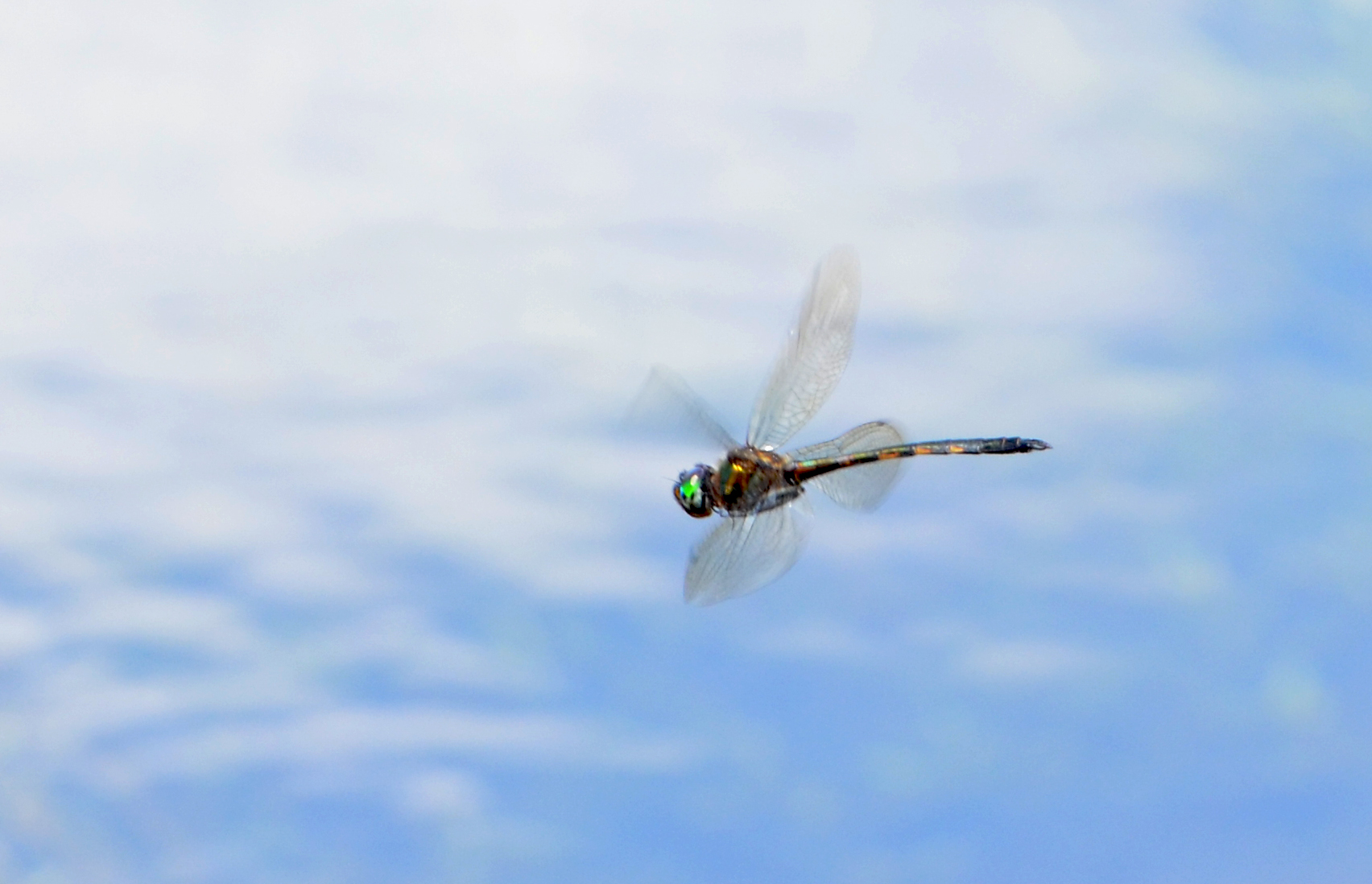
Hemicordulia asiatica male

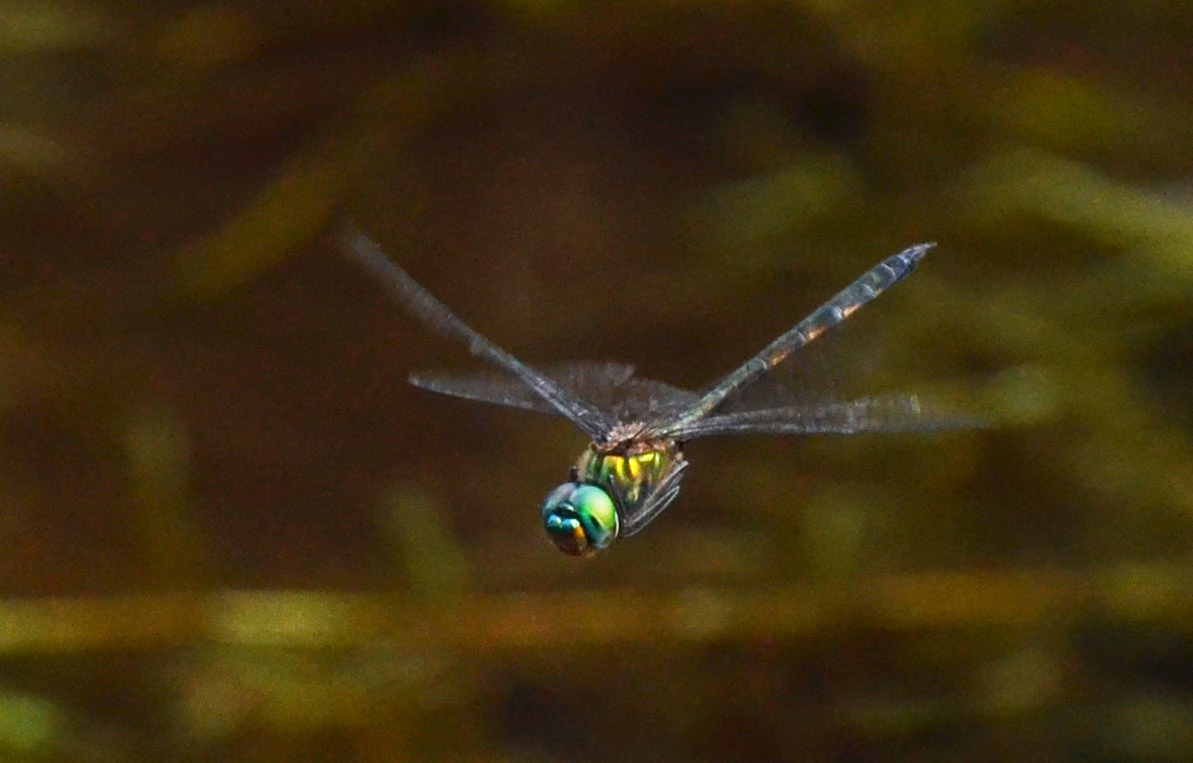
Hemicordulia asiatica male

=== Family: Libellulidae (Skimmers) ===
==== Genus: Acisoma ====
===== Species: Acisoma panorpoides =====
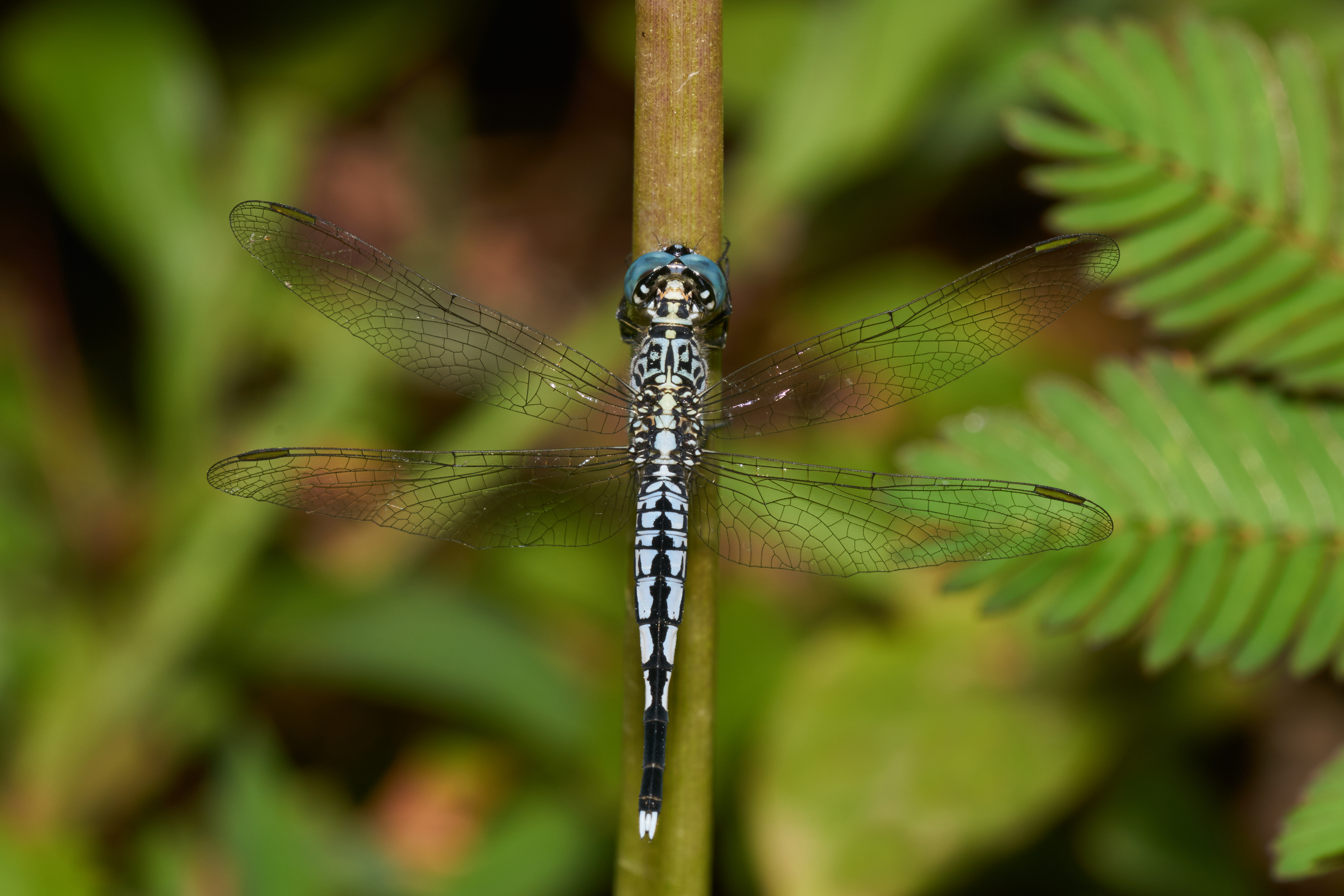
Acisoma panorpoides male

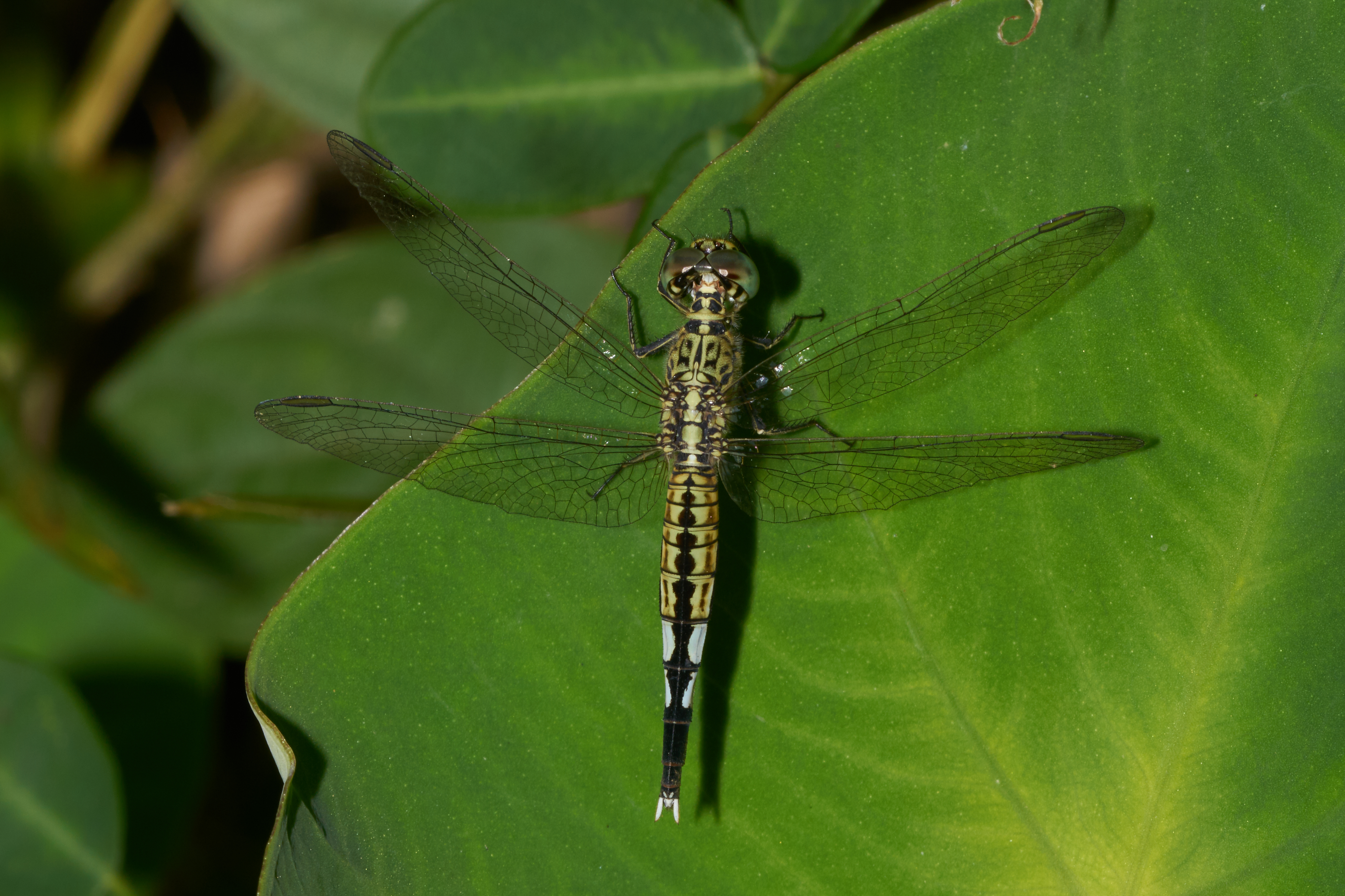
Acisoma panorpoides female

==== Genus: Aethriamanta ====
===== Species: Aethriamanta brevipennis =====
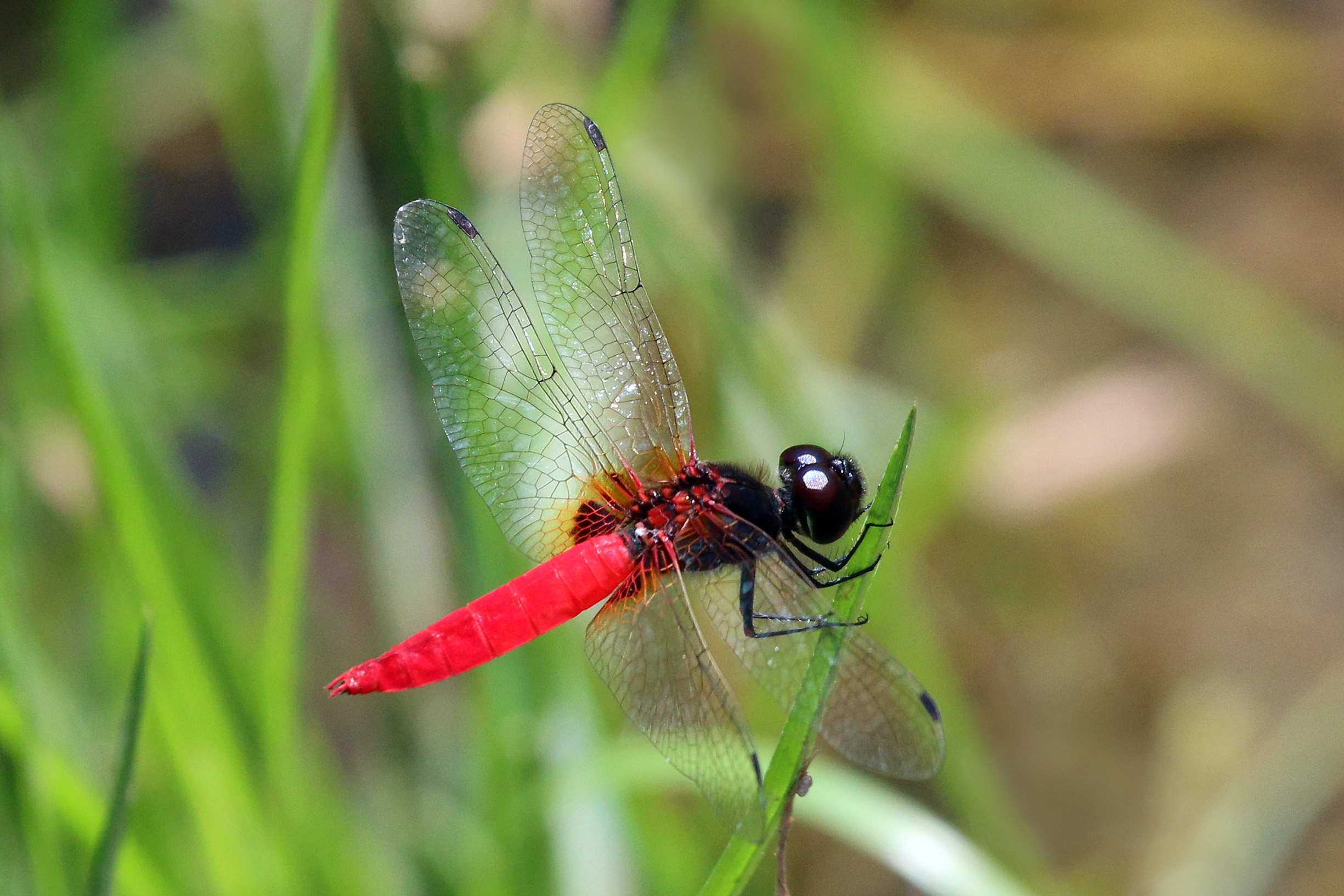
Aethriamanta brevipennis male

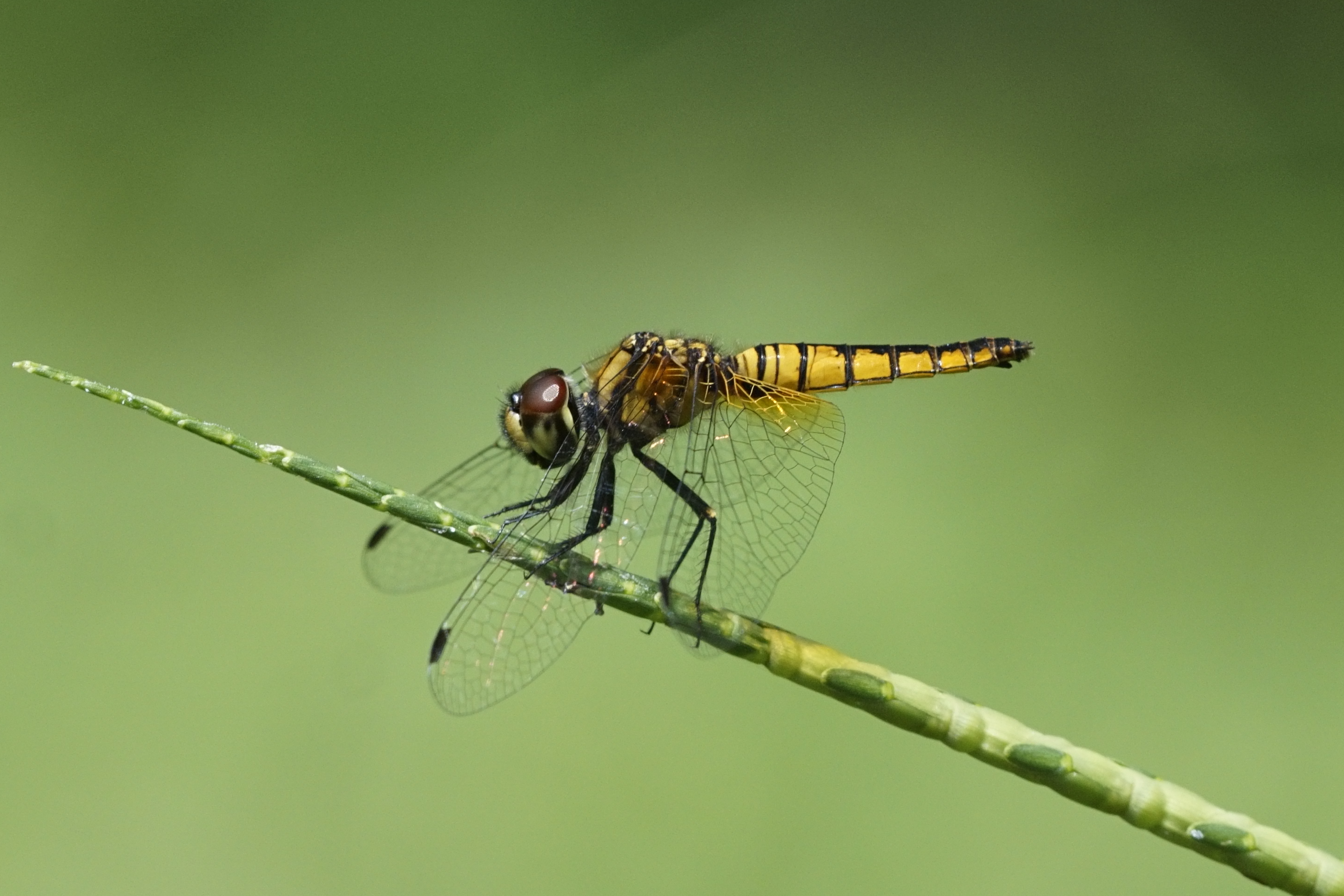
Aethriamanta brevipennis female

==== Genus: Brachydiplax ====
===== Species: Brachydiplax chalybea =====
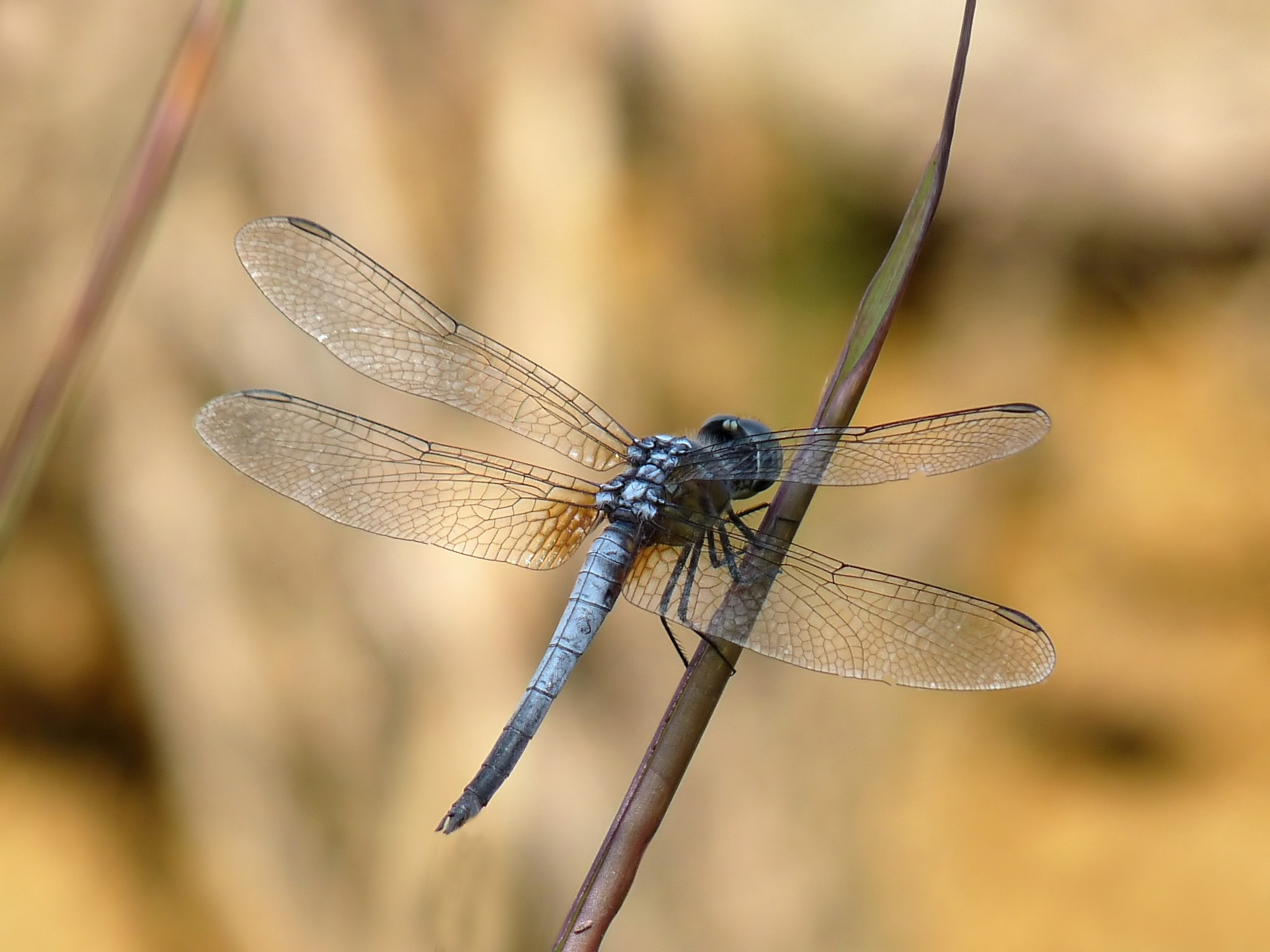
Brachydiplax chalybea male

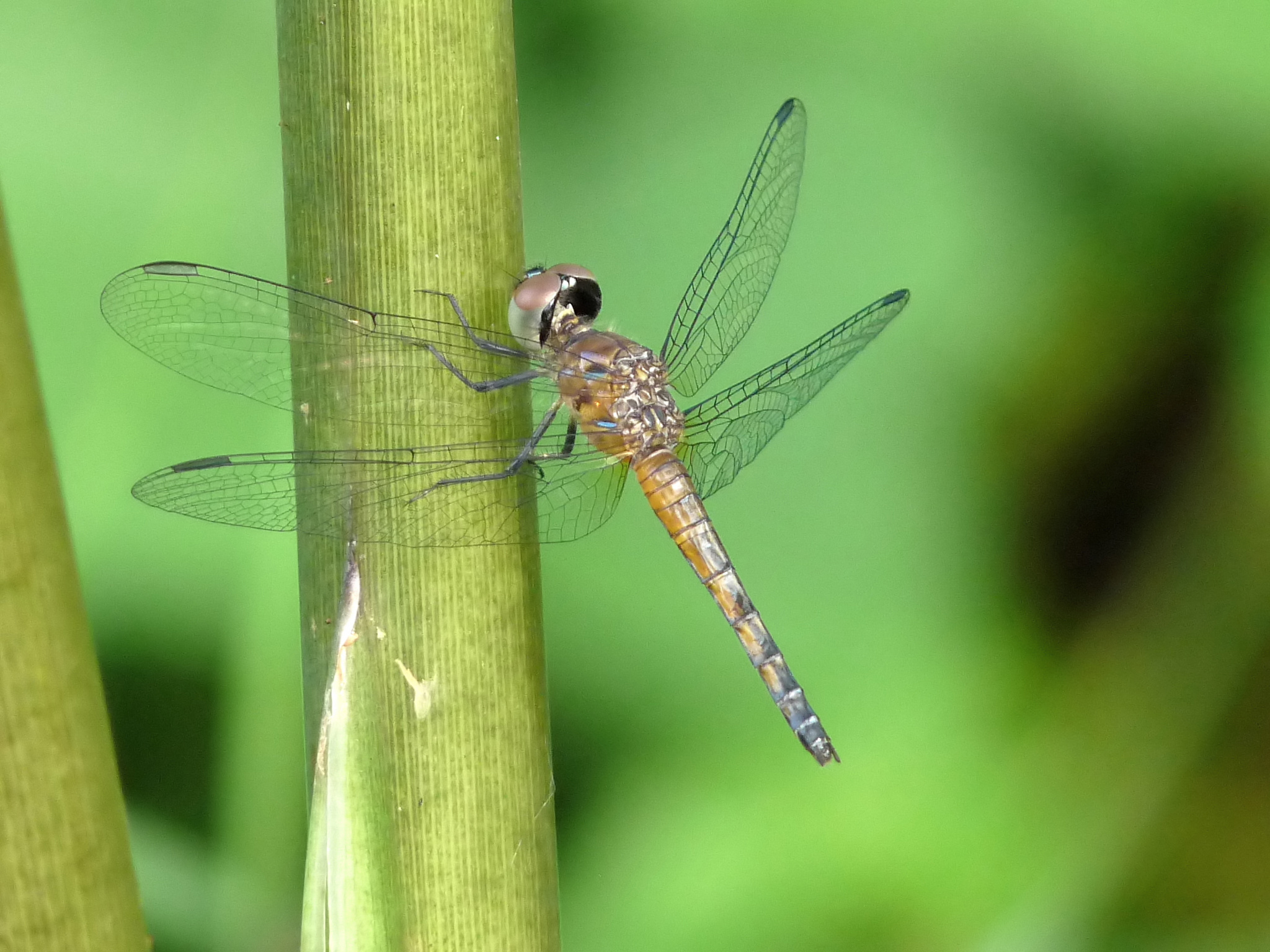
Brachydiplax chalybea female

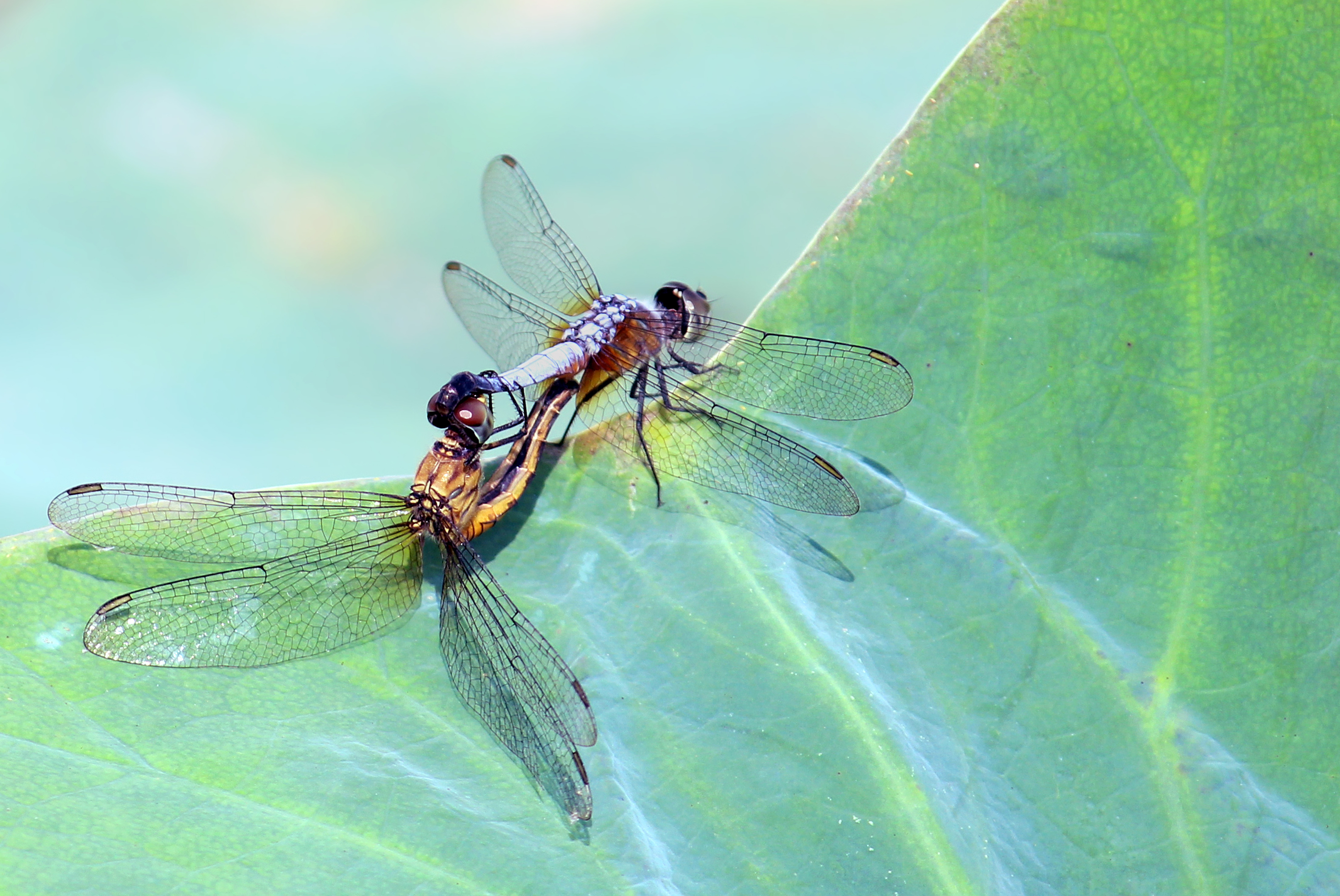
Mating

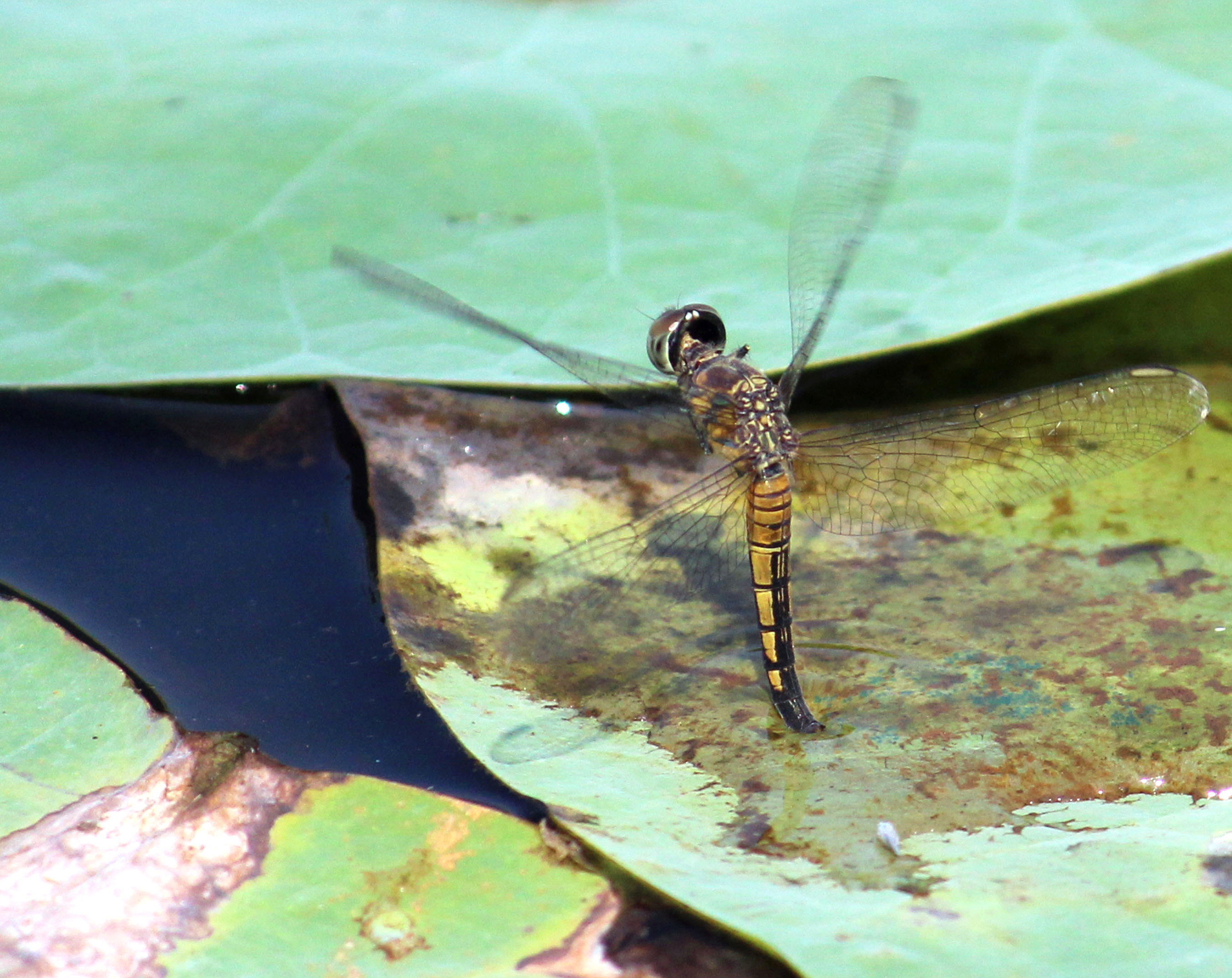
Egg laying

===== Species: Brachydiplax sobrina =====
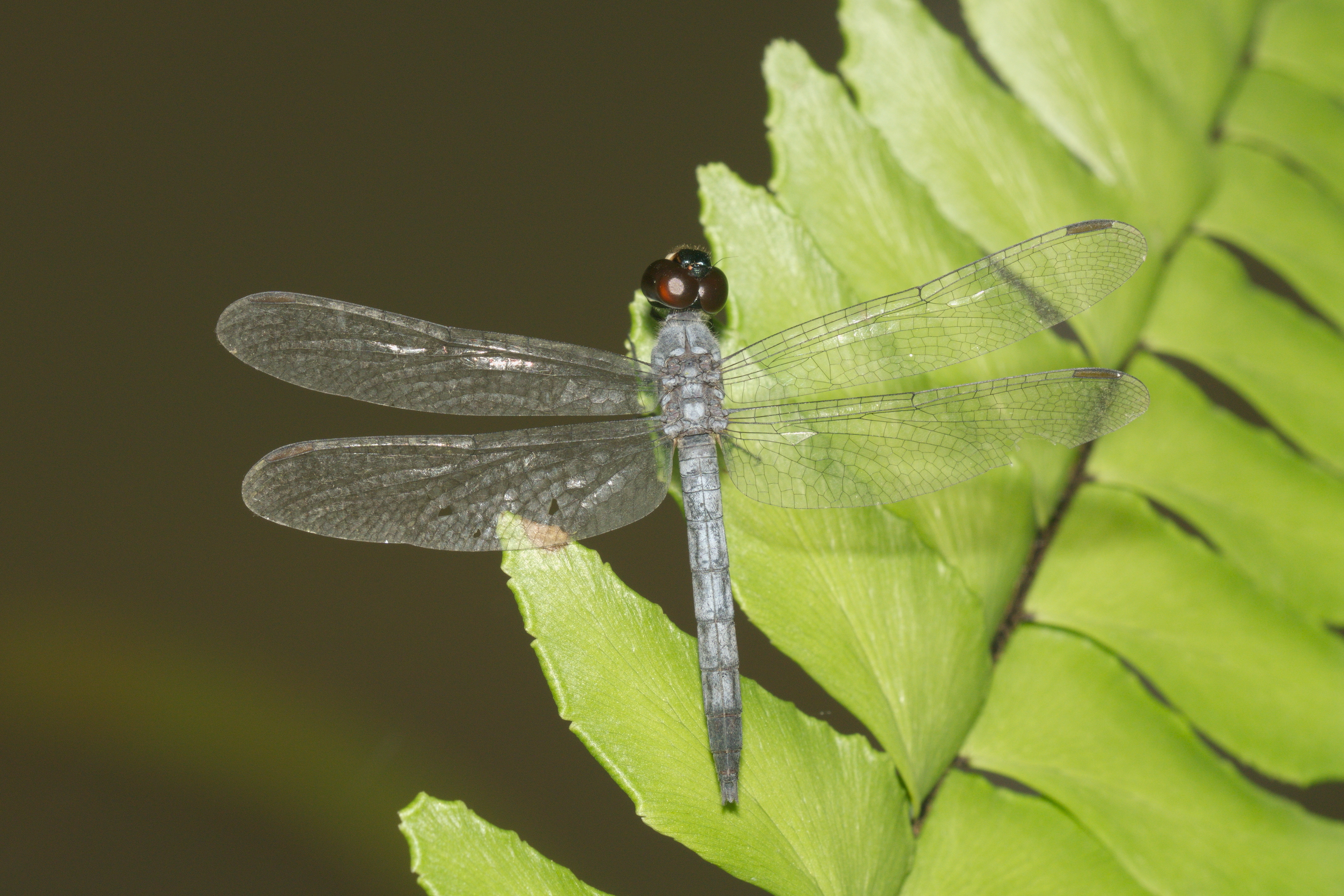
Brachydiplax sobrina male

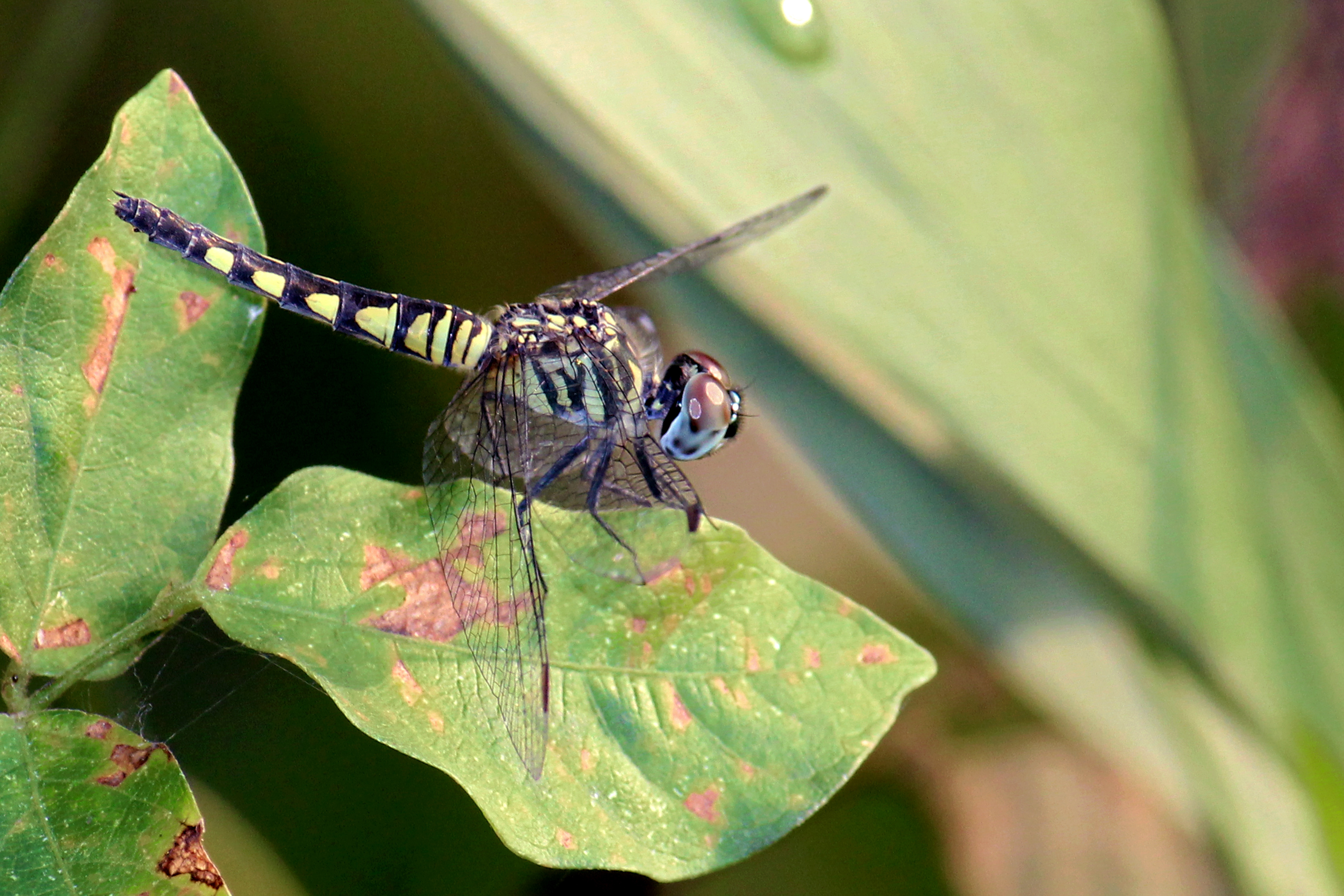
Brachydiplax sobrina female

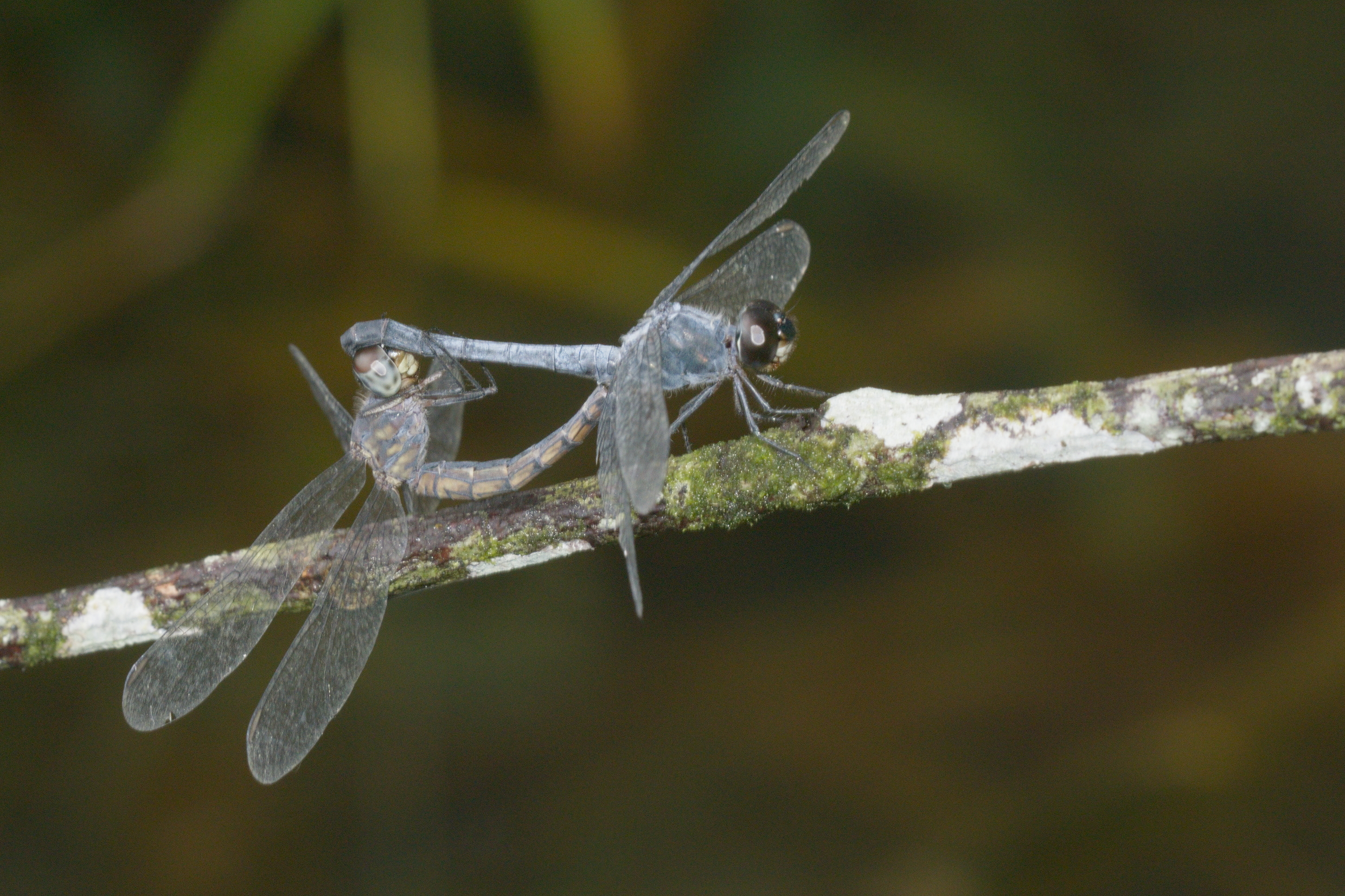
Brachydiplax sobrina mating pair

==== Genus: Brachythemis ====
===== Species: Brachythemis contaminata =====
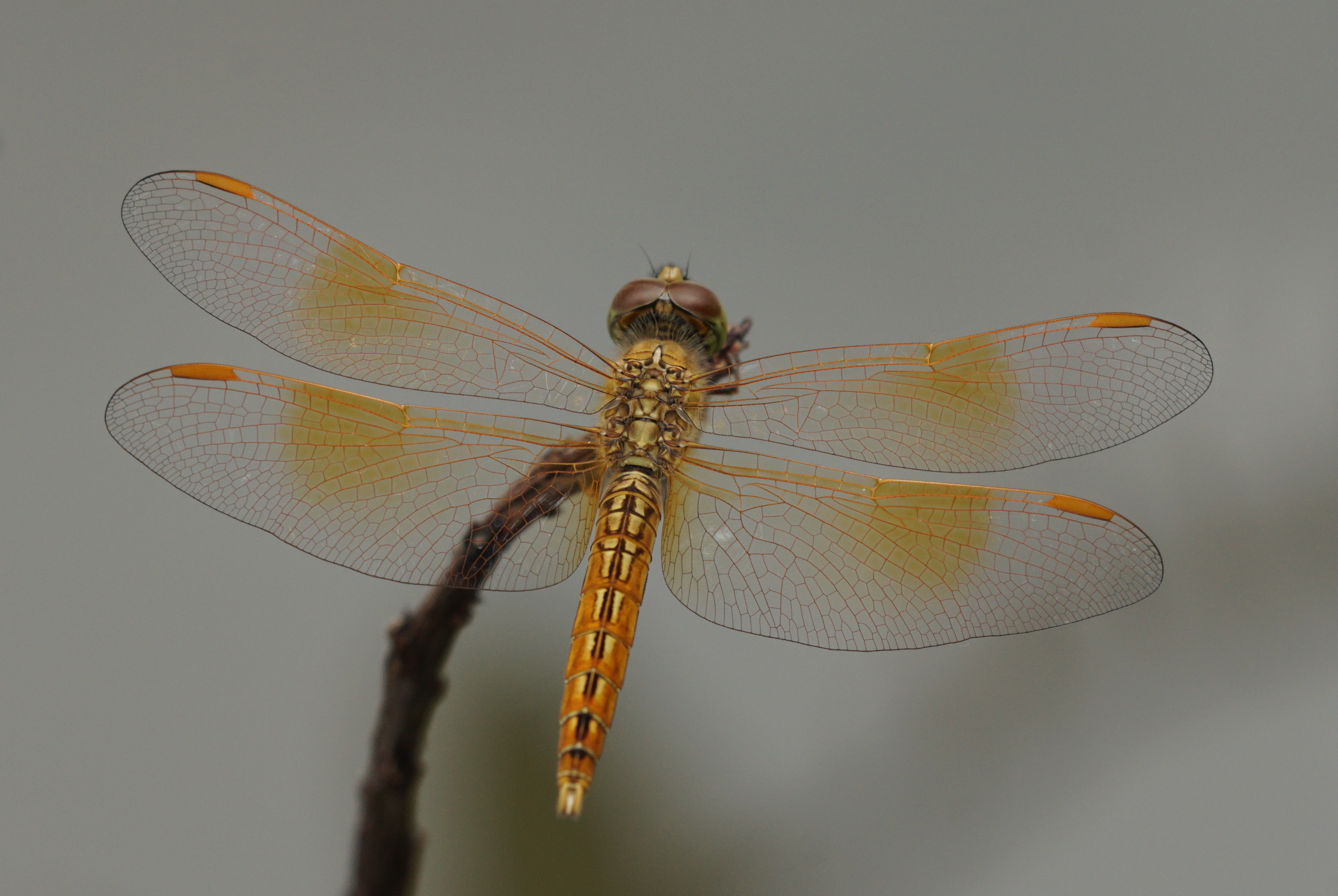
Brachythemis contaminata male

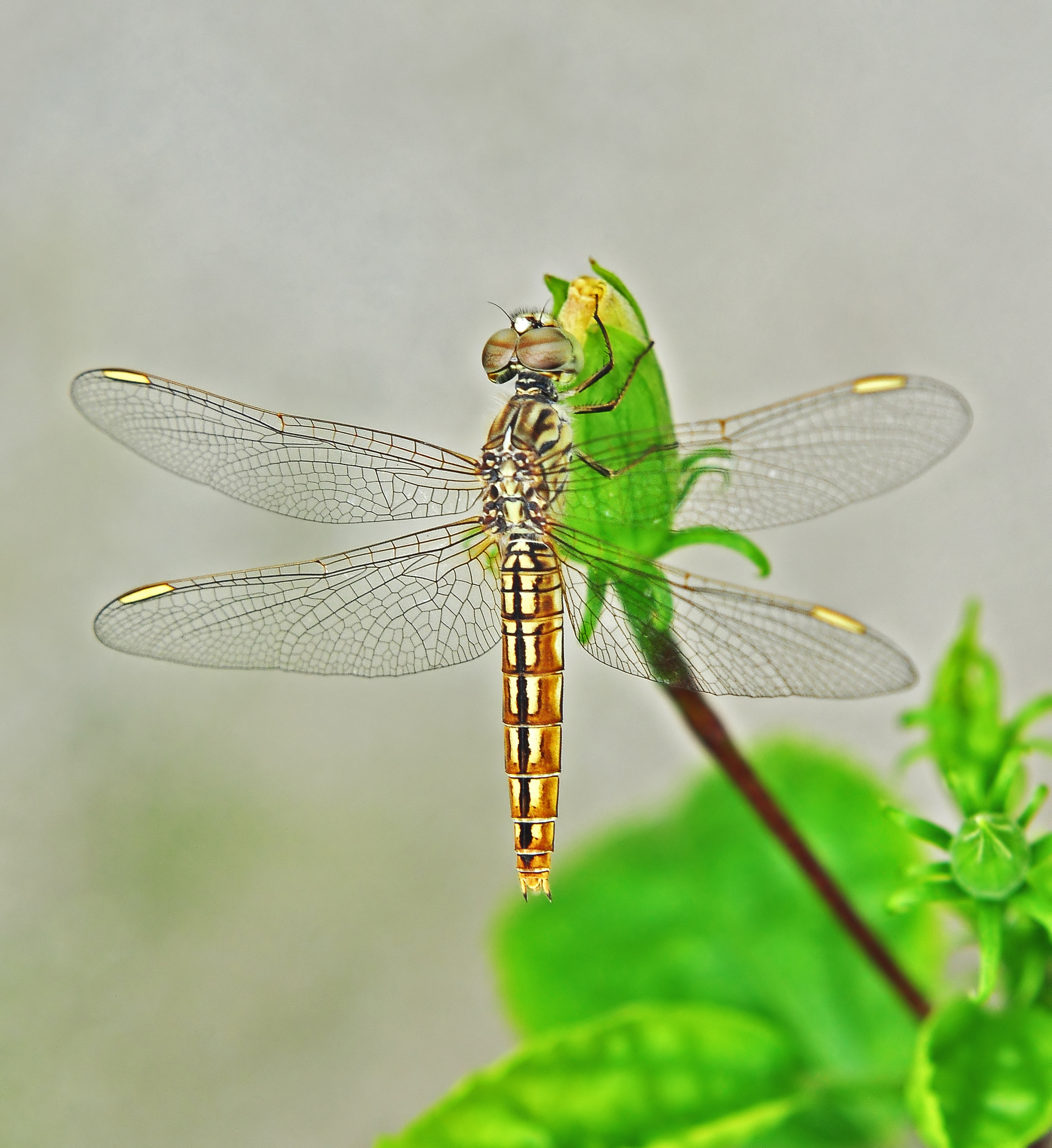
Brachythemis contaminata female

==== Genus: Bradinopyga ====
===== Species: Bradinopyga geminata =====
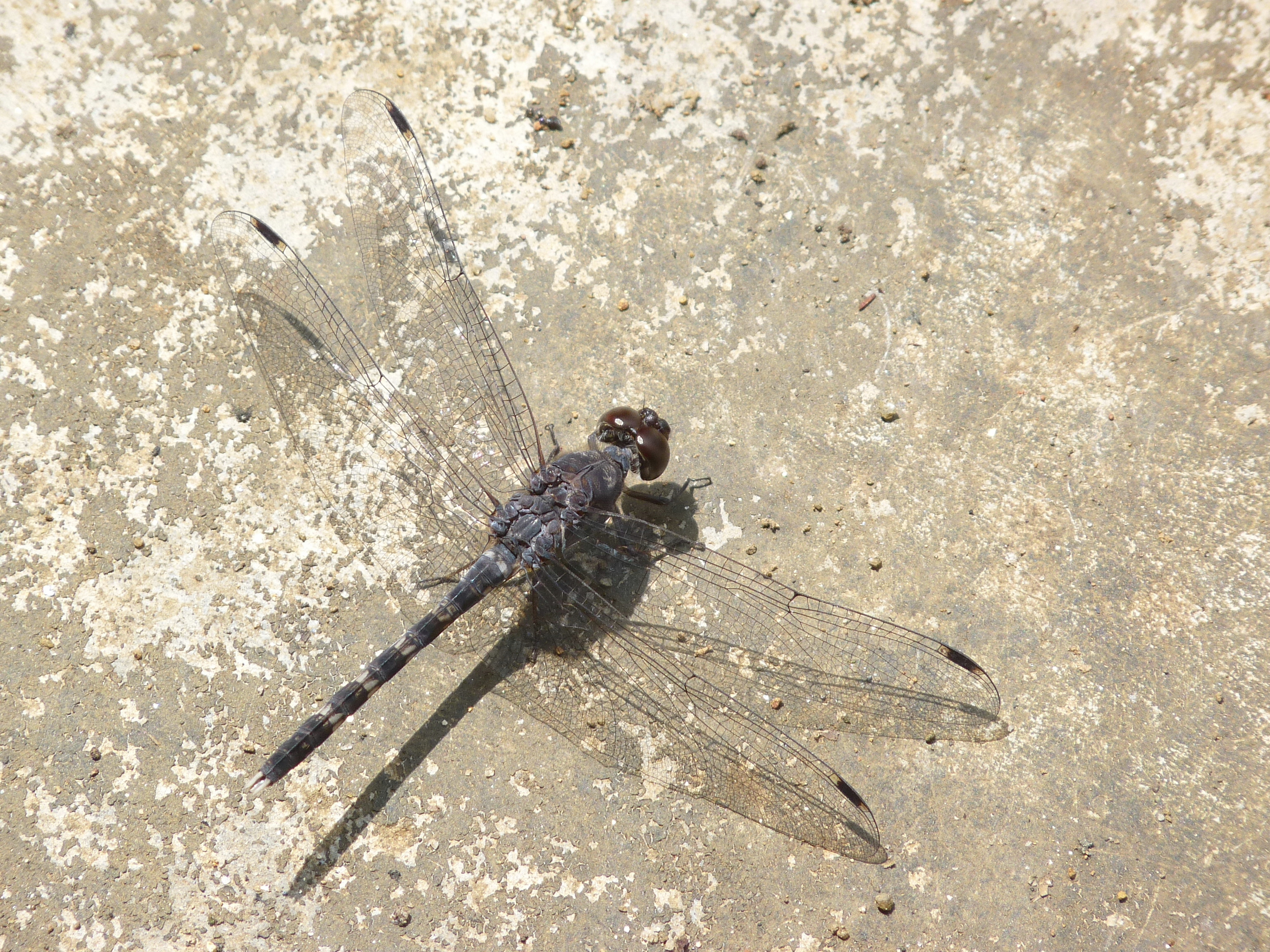
Bradinopyga geminata male

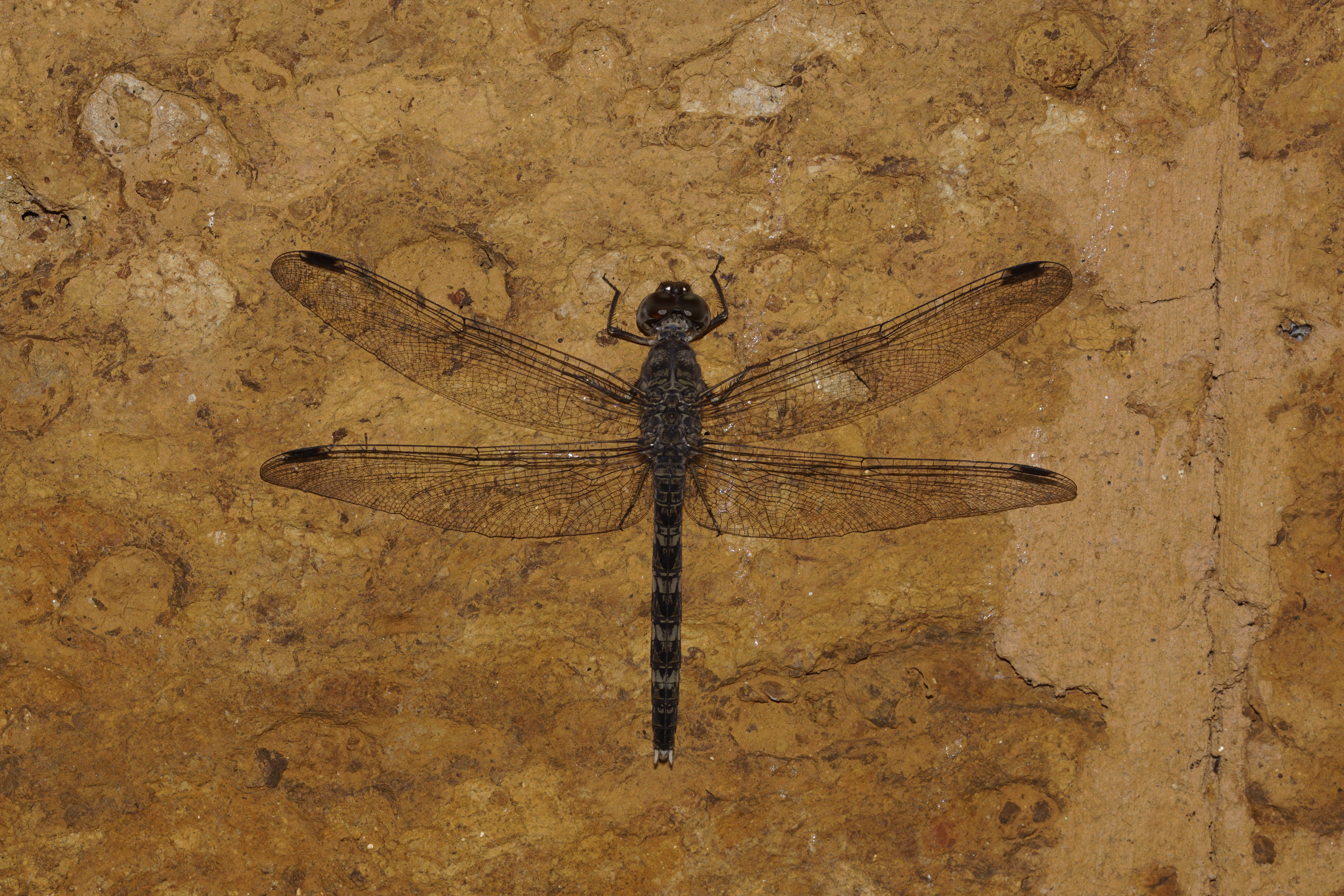
Bradinopyga geminata female

===== Species: Bradinopyga konkanensis =====
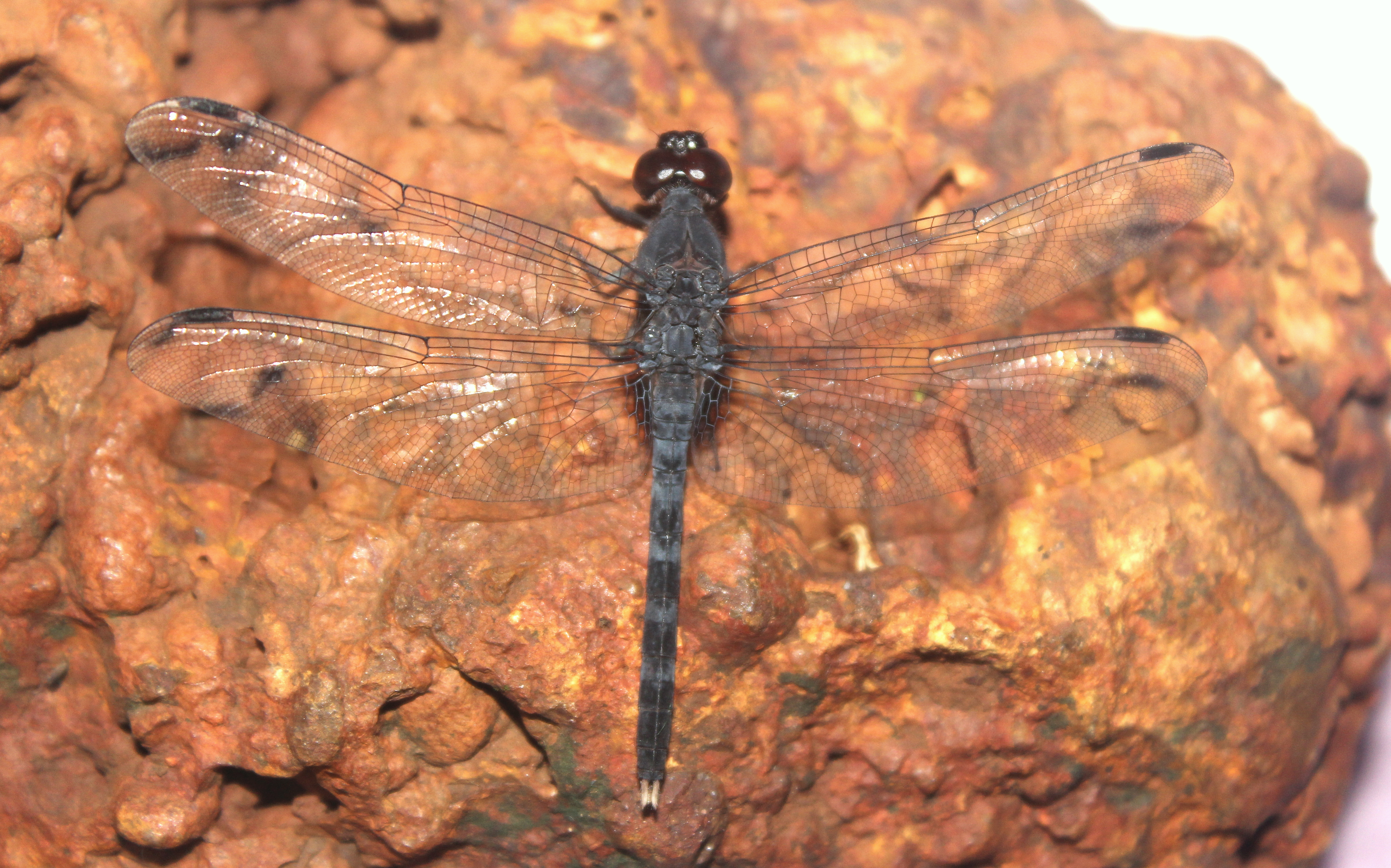
male

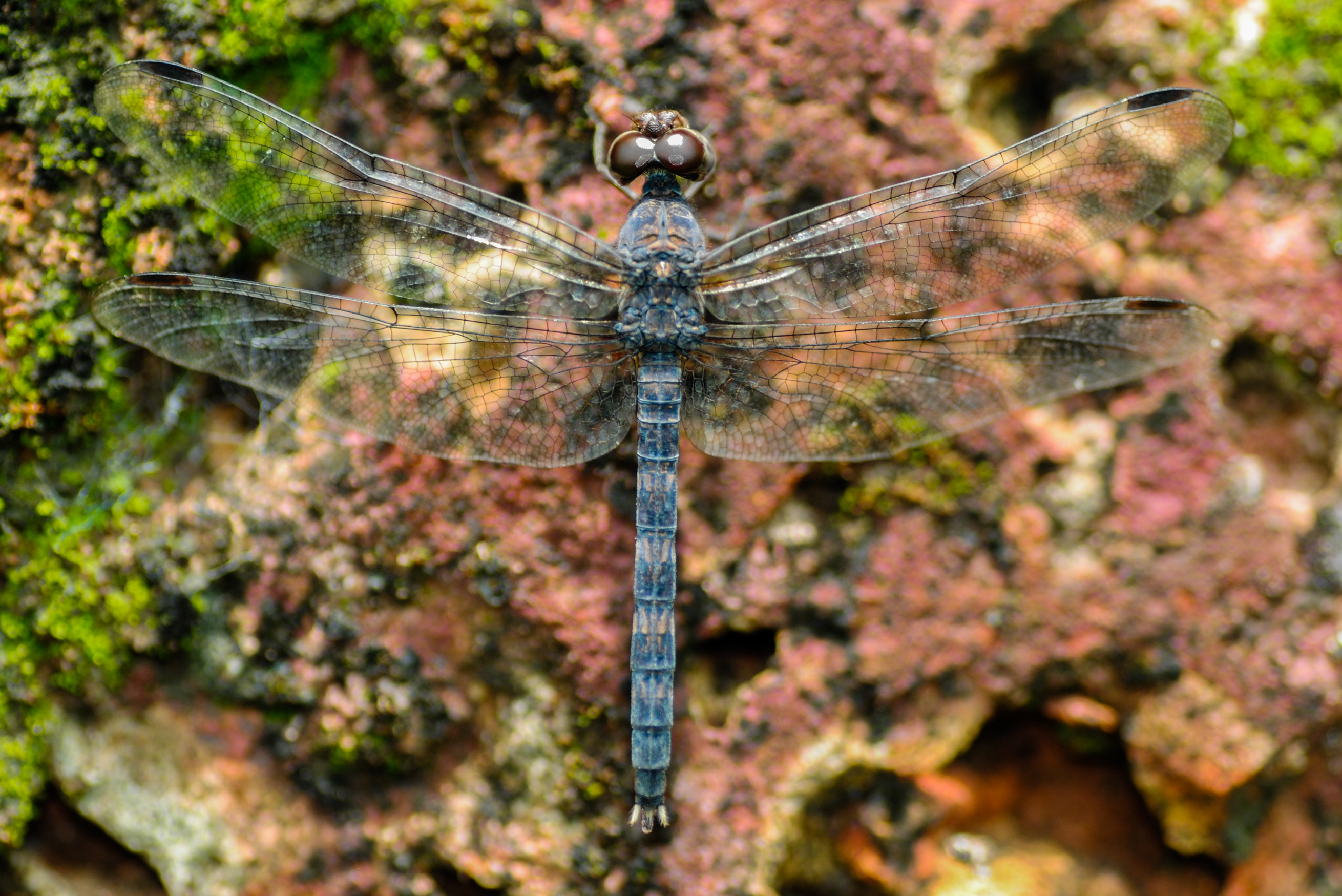
female

==== Genus: Cratilla ====
===== Species: Cratilla lineata =====
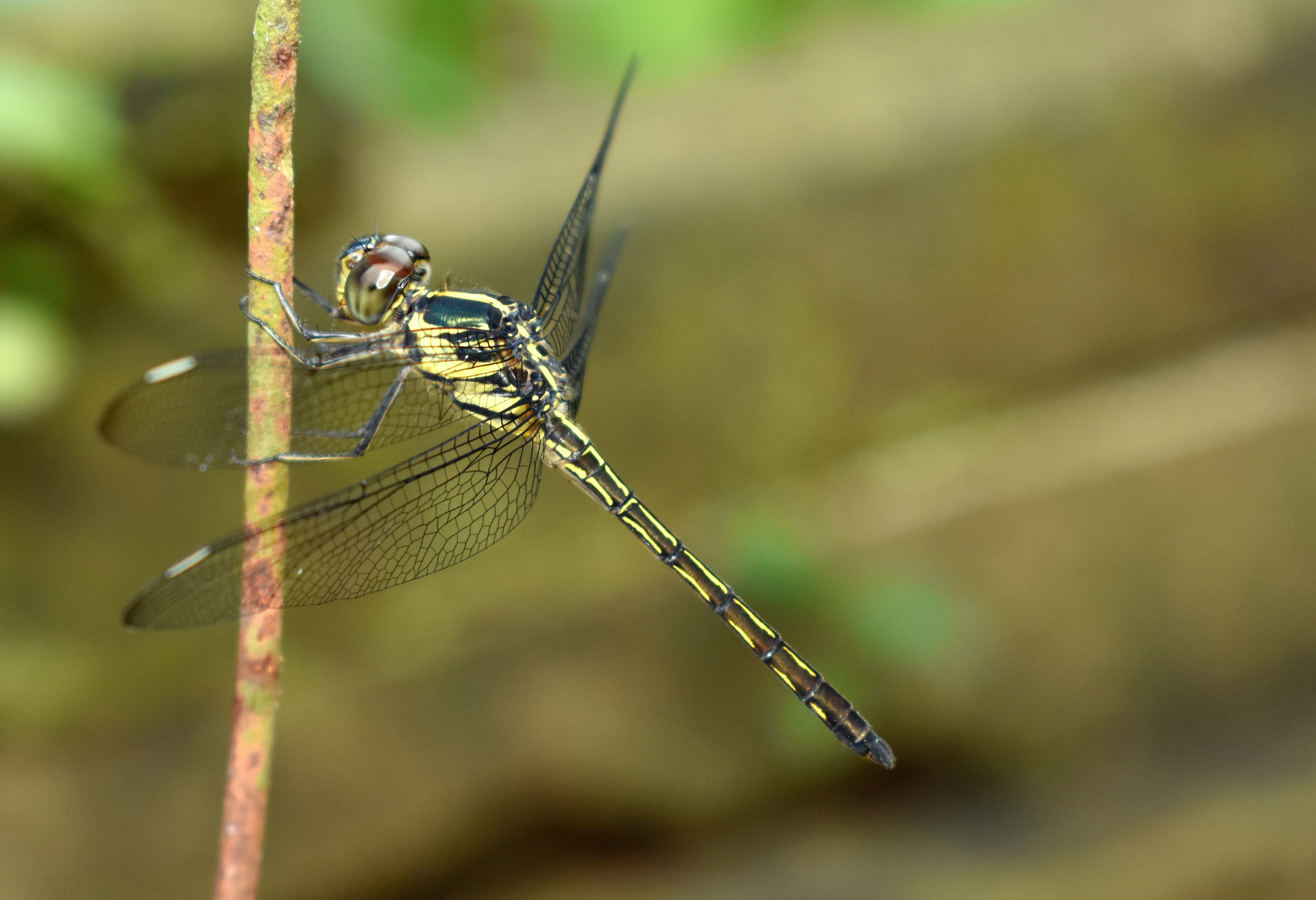
male

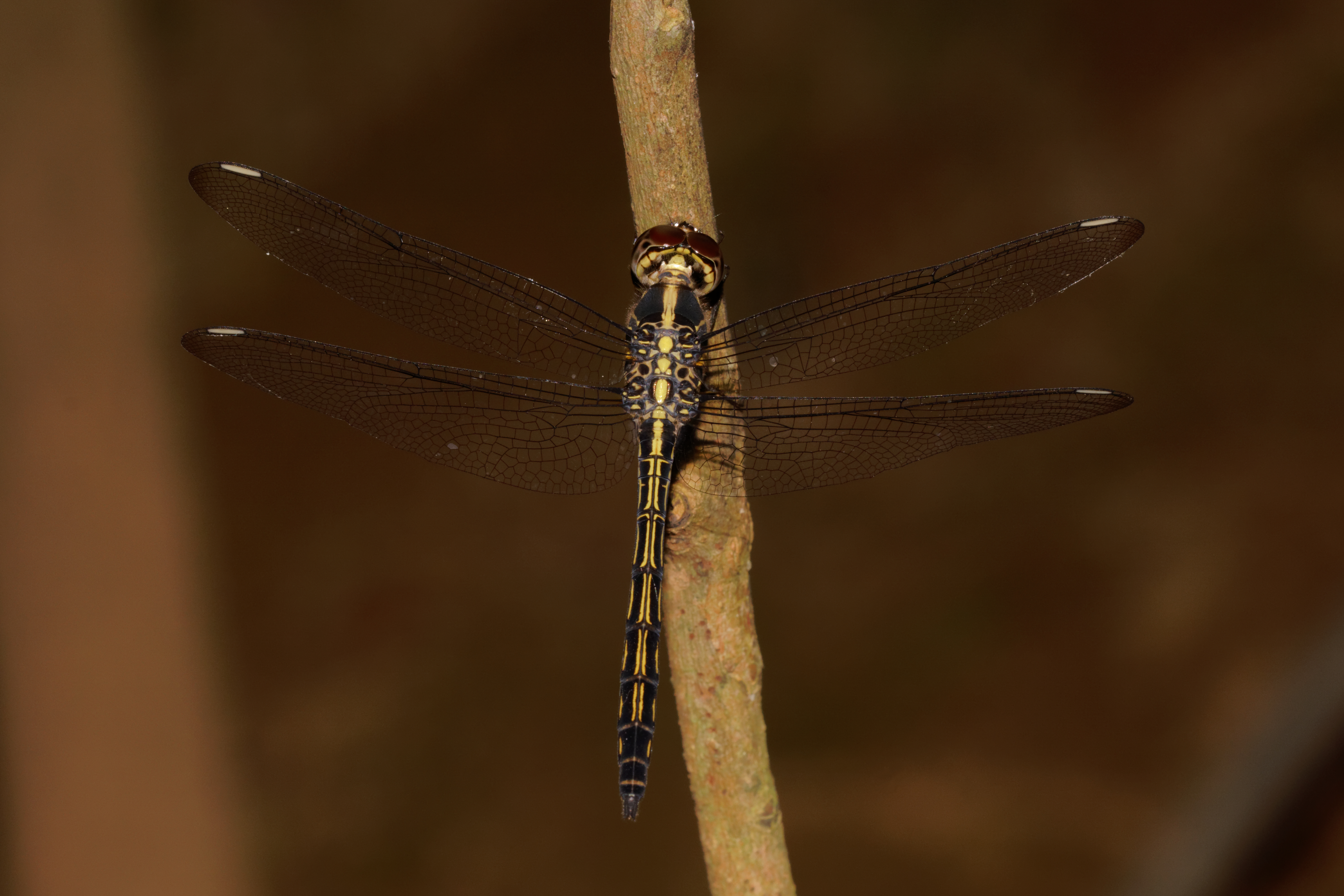
Cratilla lineata male

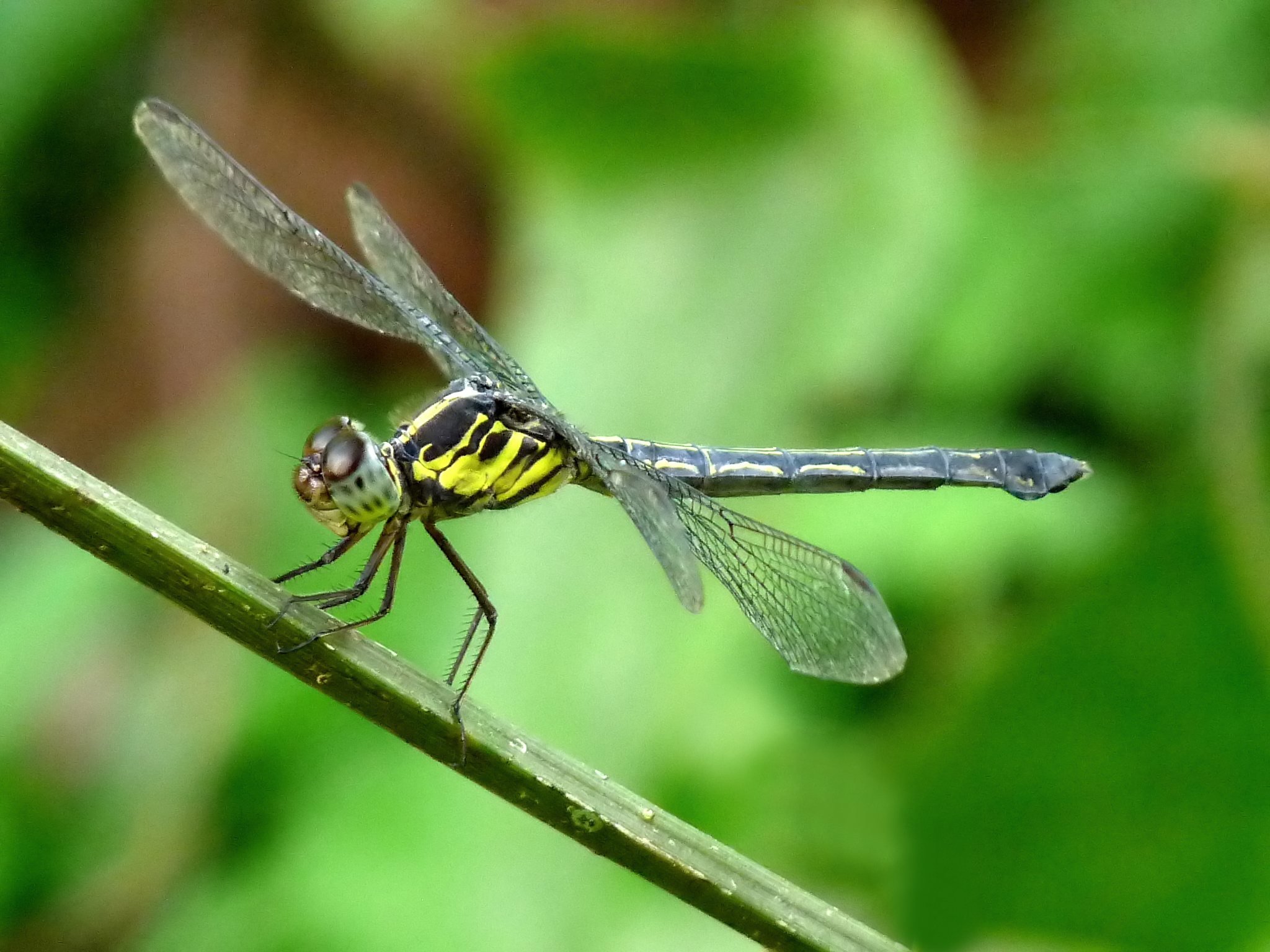
Cratilla lineata female

==== Genus: Crocothemis ====
===== Species: Crocothemis servilia =====
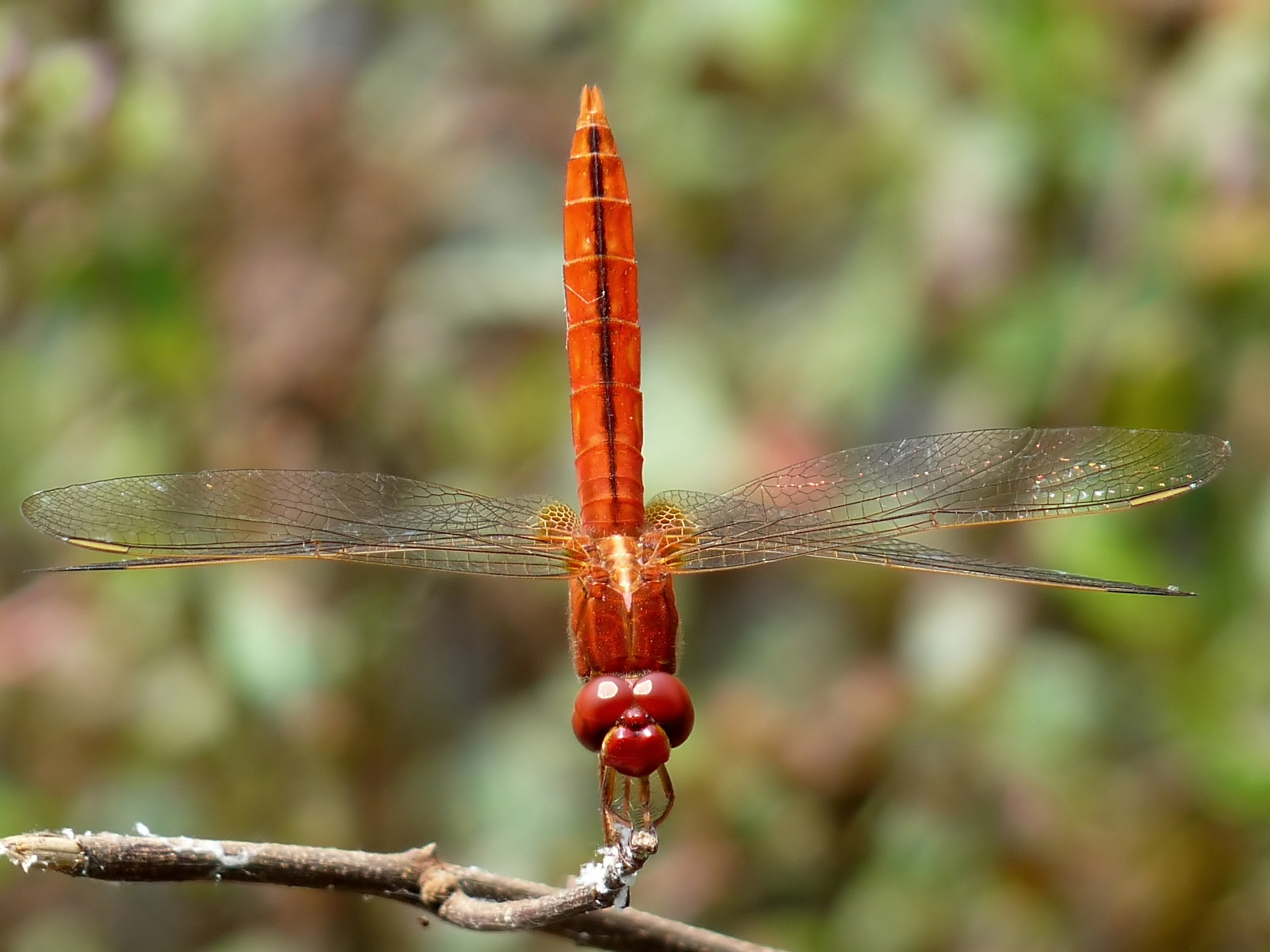
Crocothemis servilia male

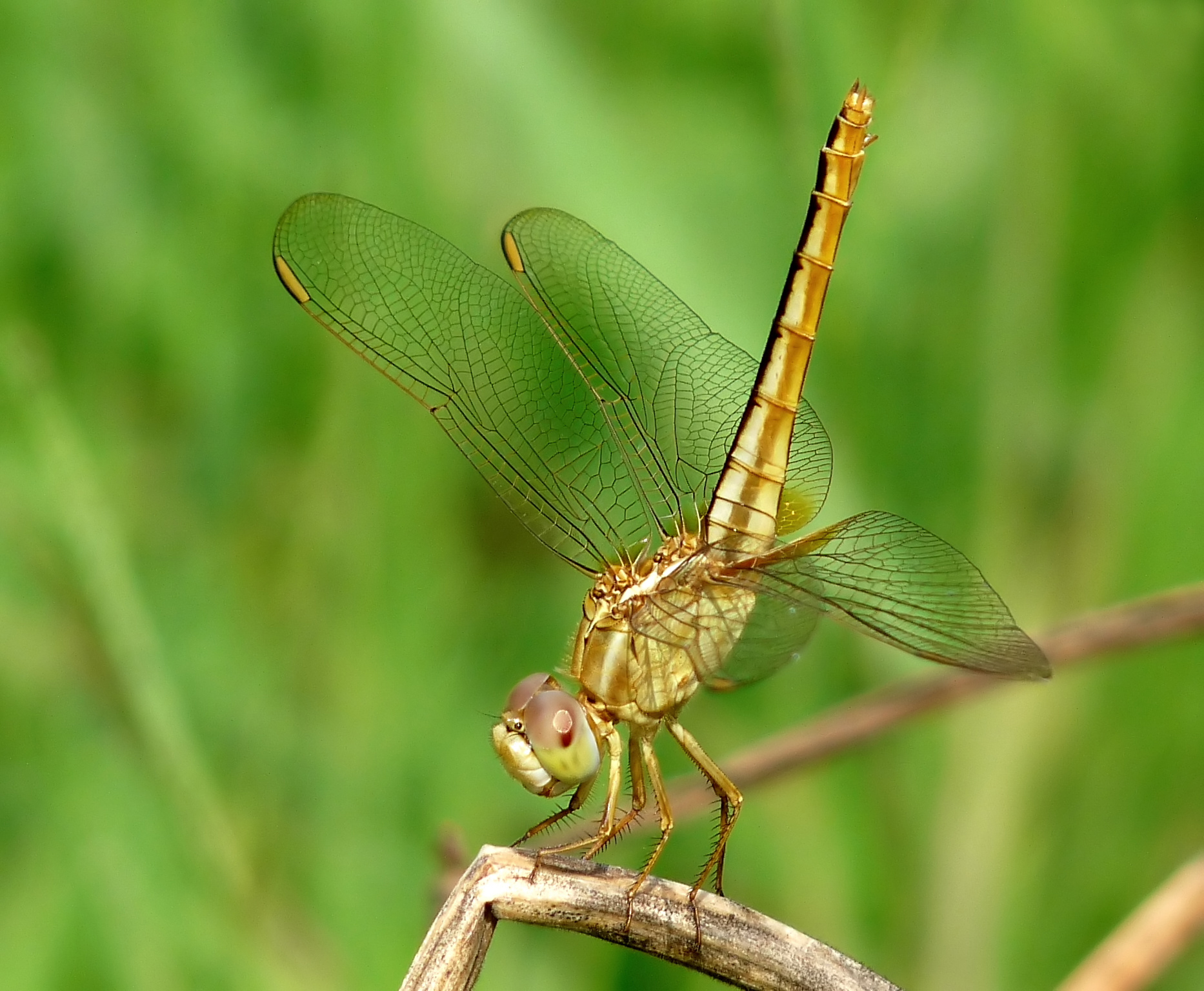
Crocothemis servilia female

==== Genus: Diplacodes ====
===== Species: Diplacodes lefebvrii =====
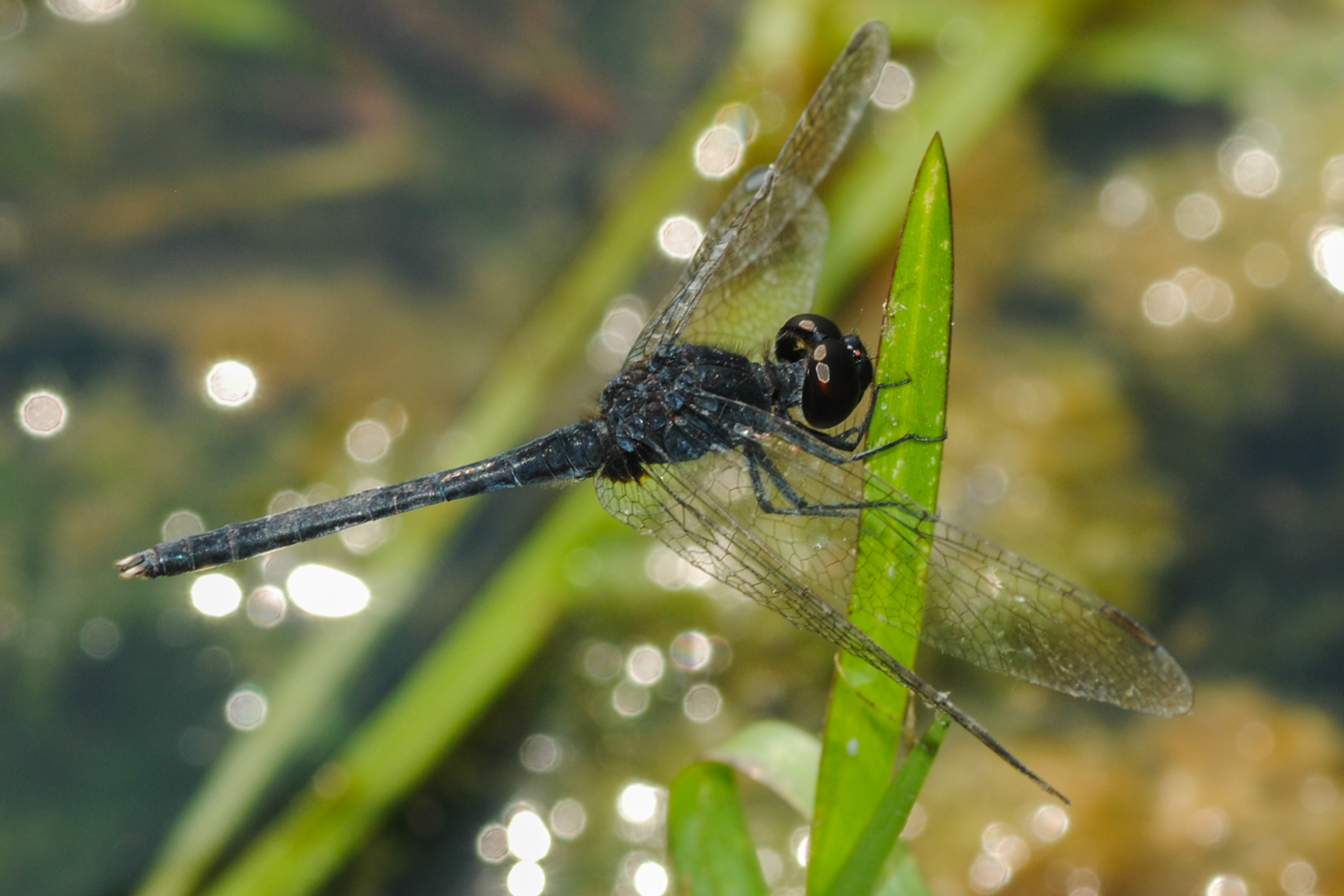
Diplacodes lefebvrii male

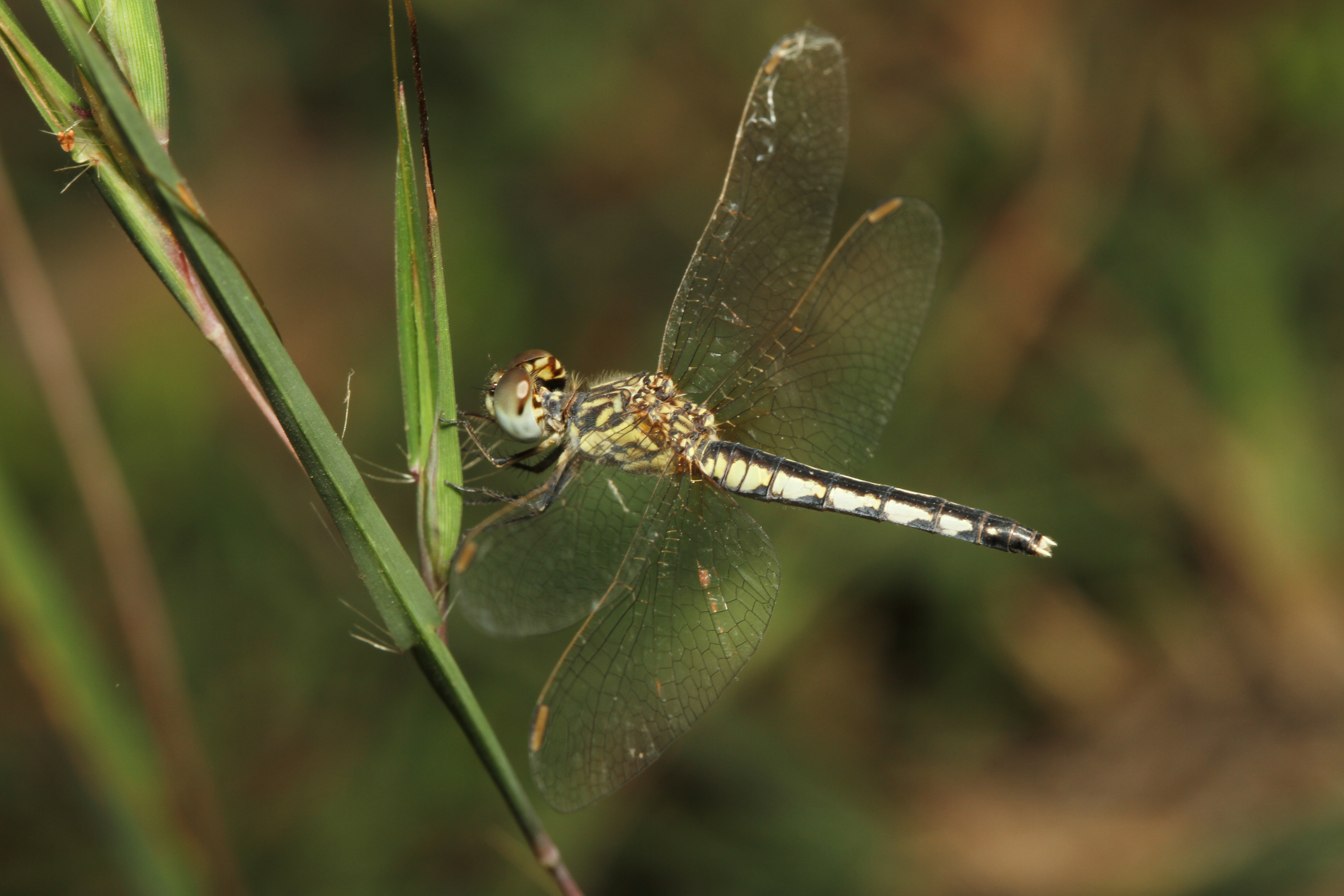
Diplacodes lefebvrii female

===== Species: Diplacodes nebulosa =====
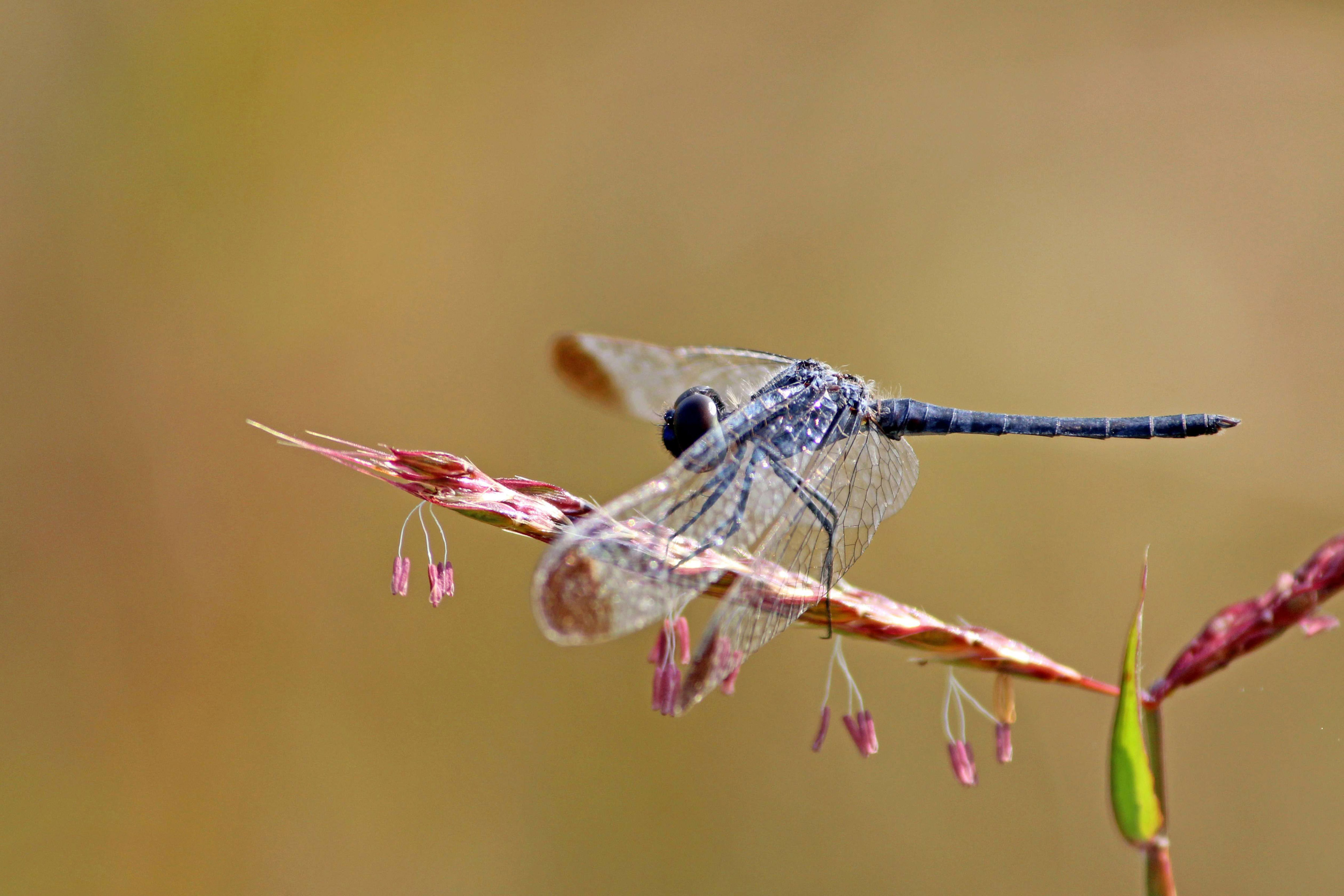
Diplacodes nebulosa male

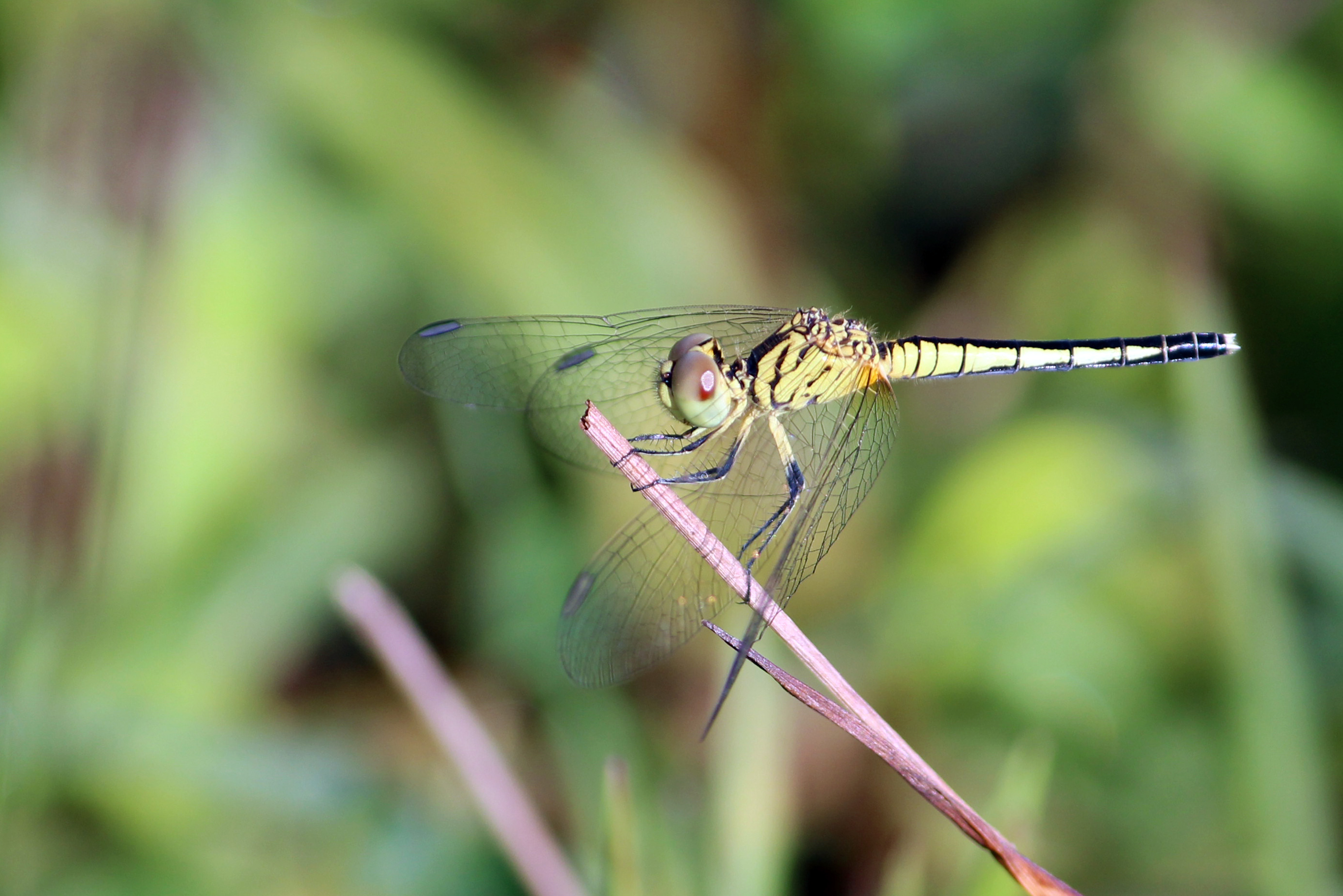
Diplacodes nebulosa female

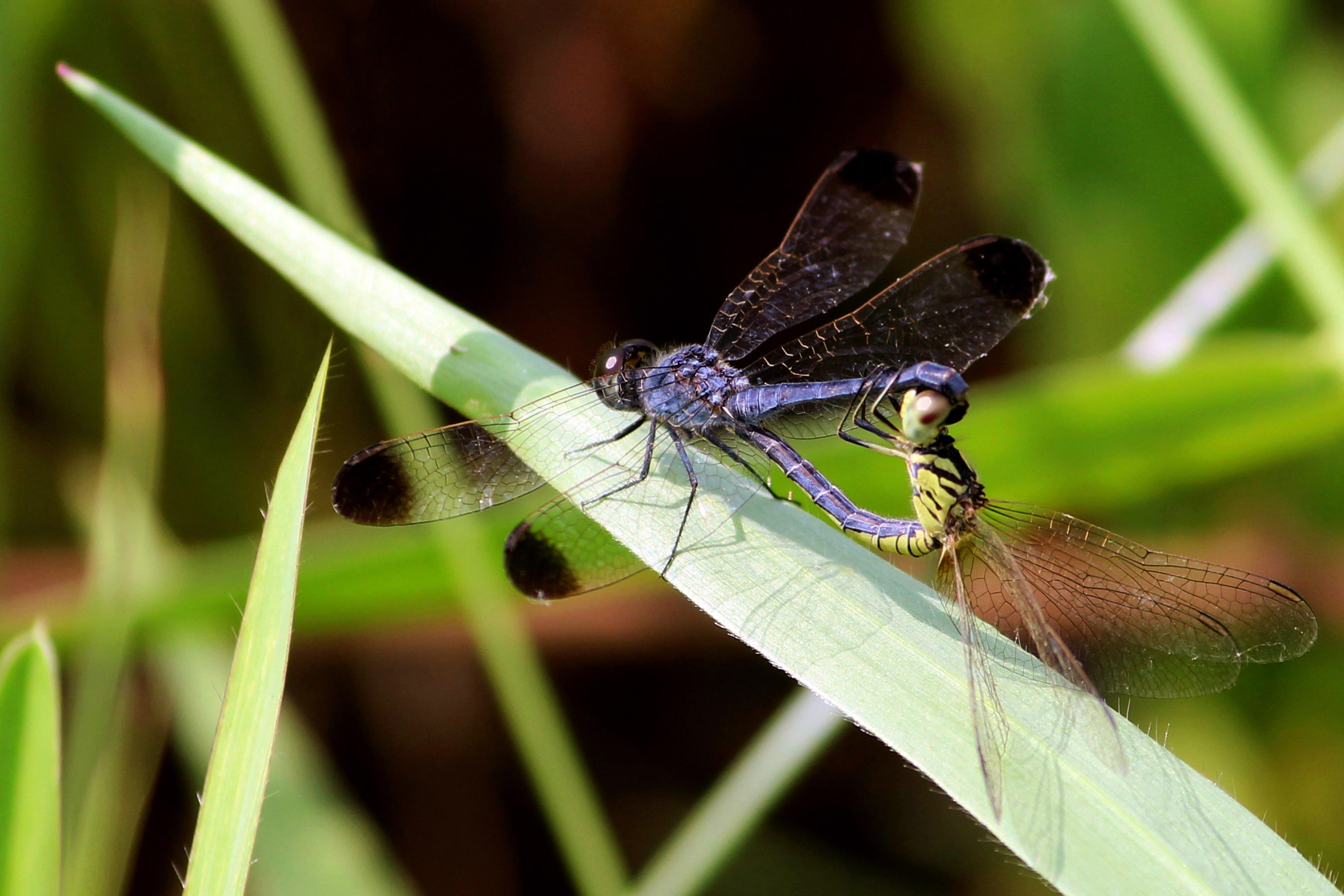
mating pair

===== Species: Diplacodes trivialis =====
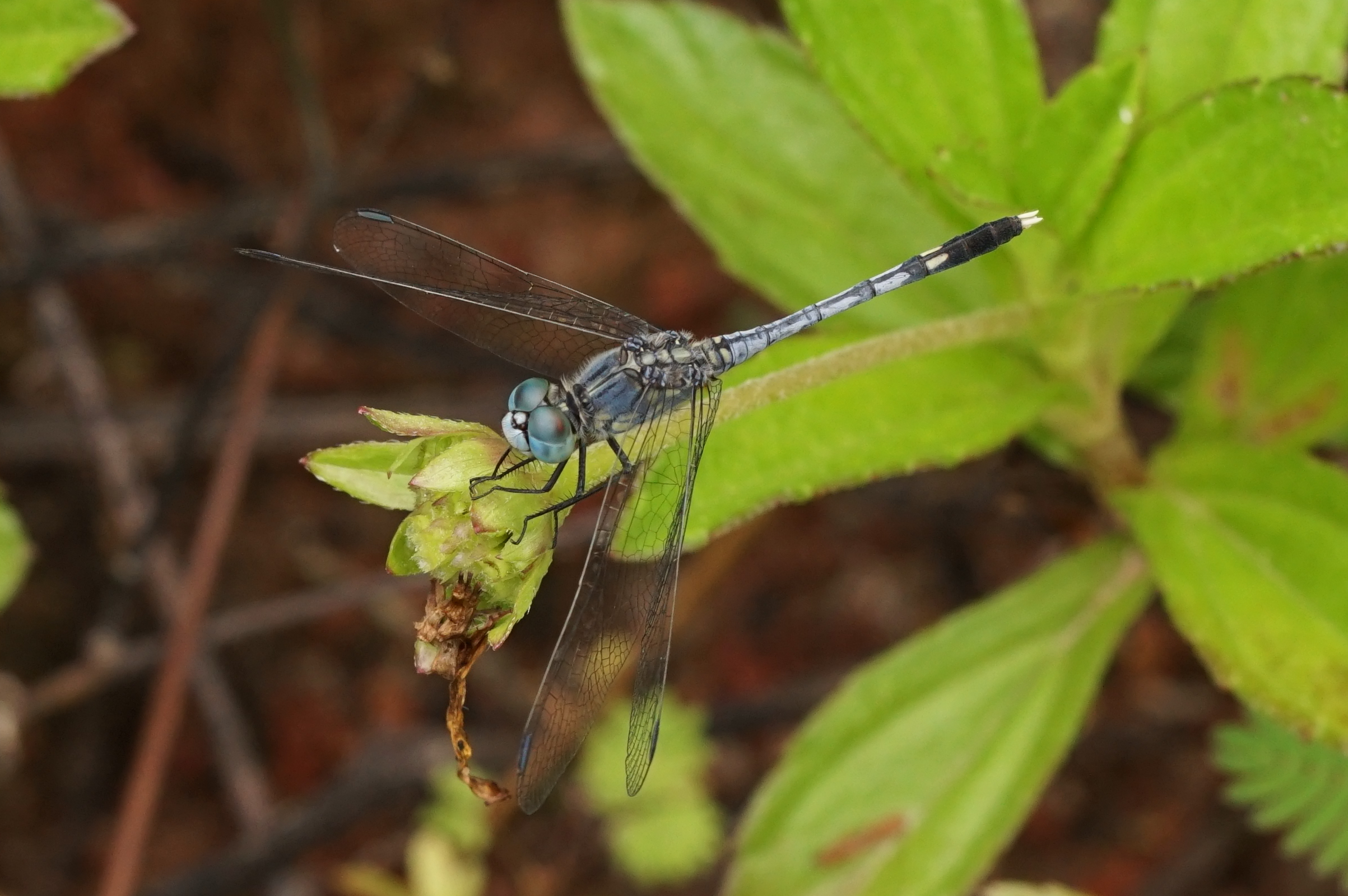
Diplacodes trivialis male

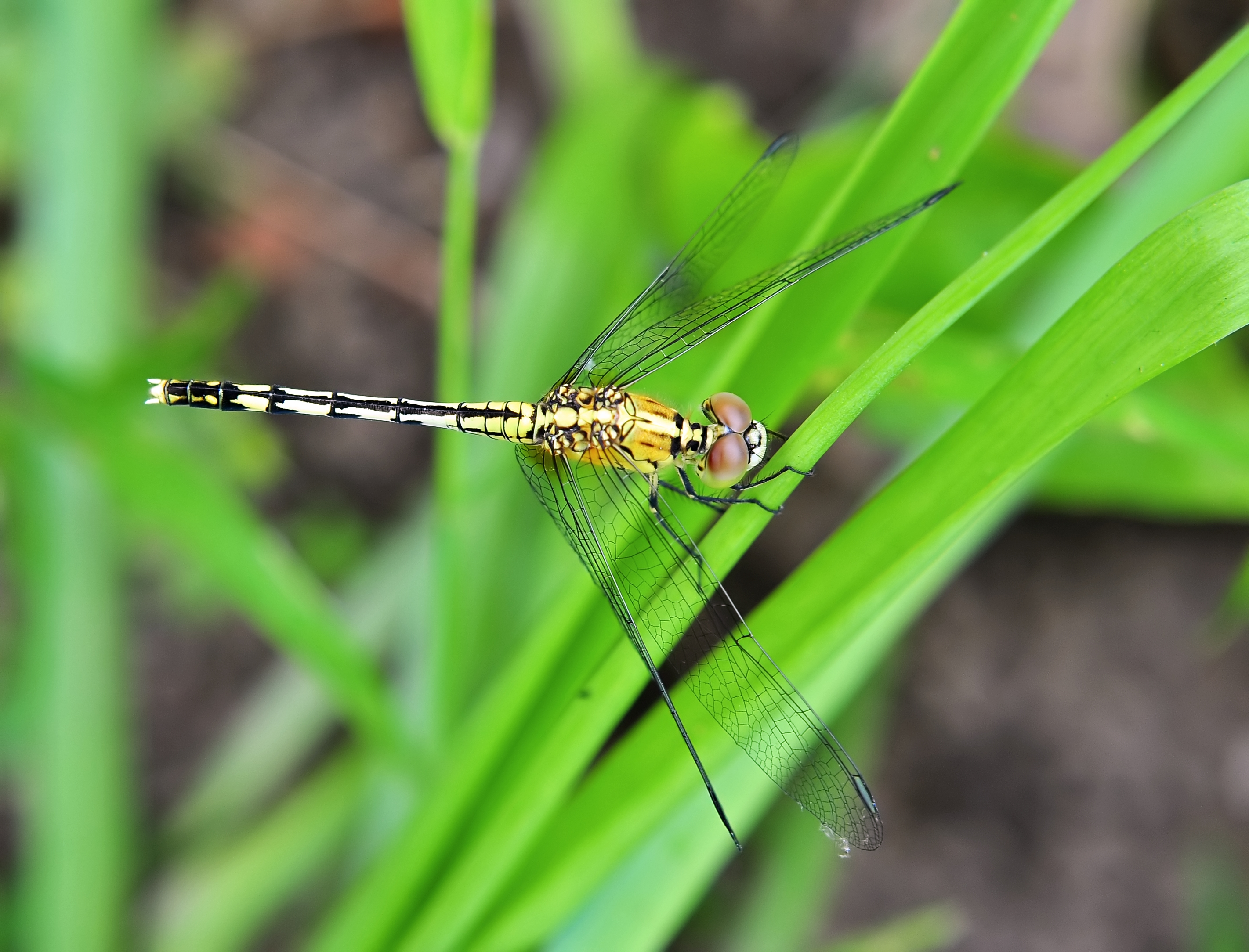
Diplacodes trivialis female

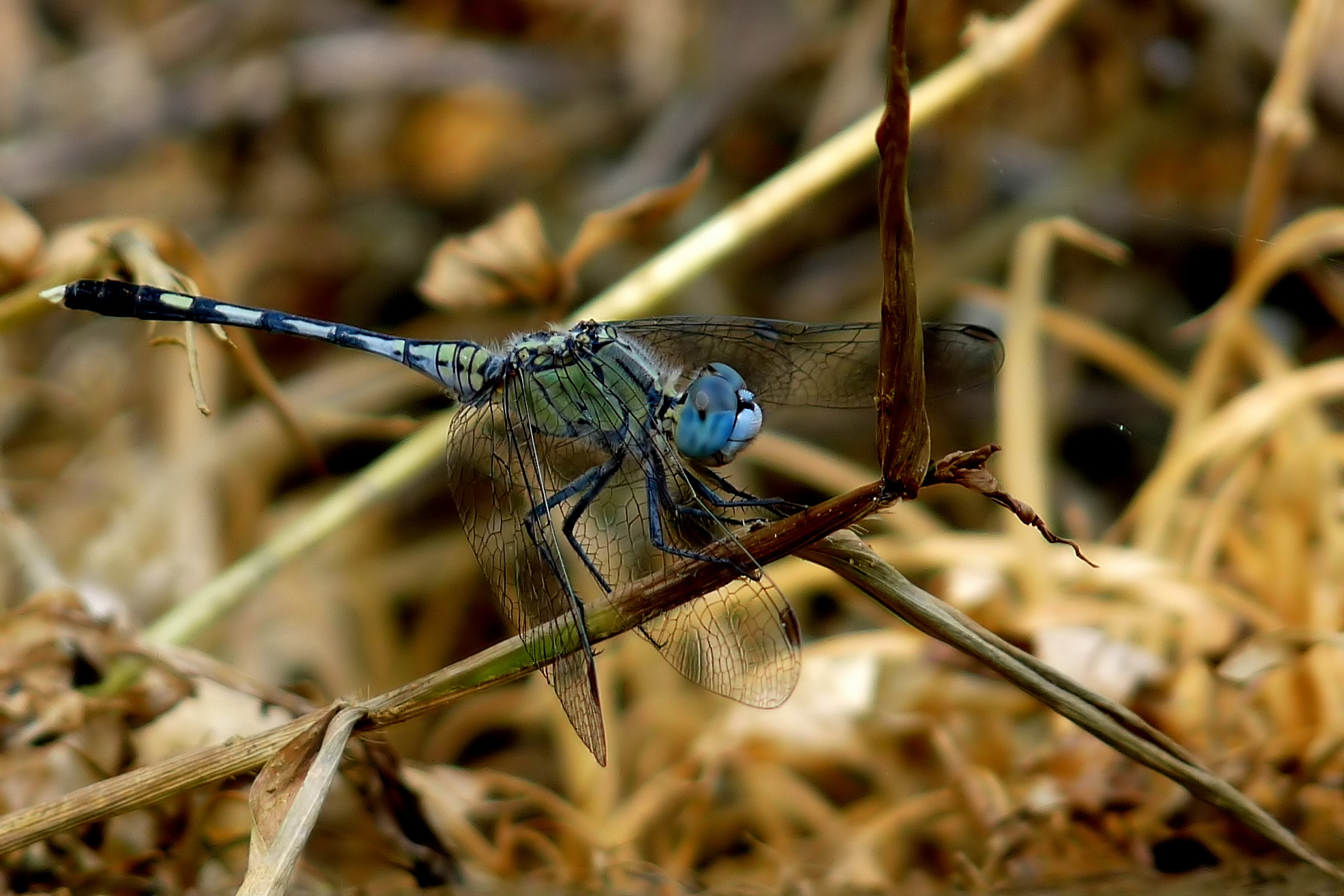
Diplacodes trivialis sub-adult male

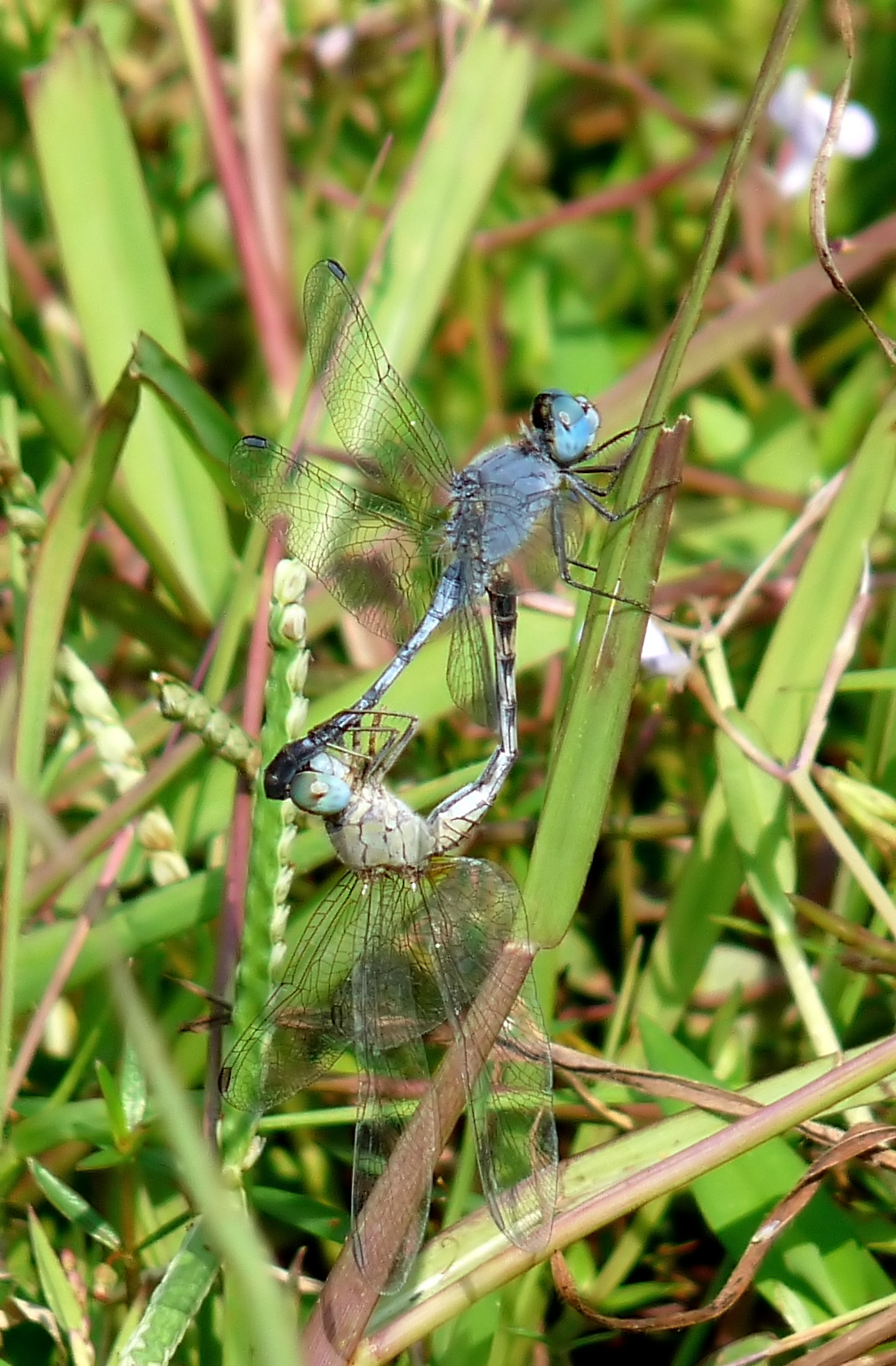
Diplacodes trivialis mating pair

==== Genus: Epithemis ====
===== Species: Epithemis mariae =====
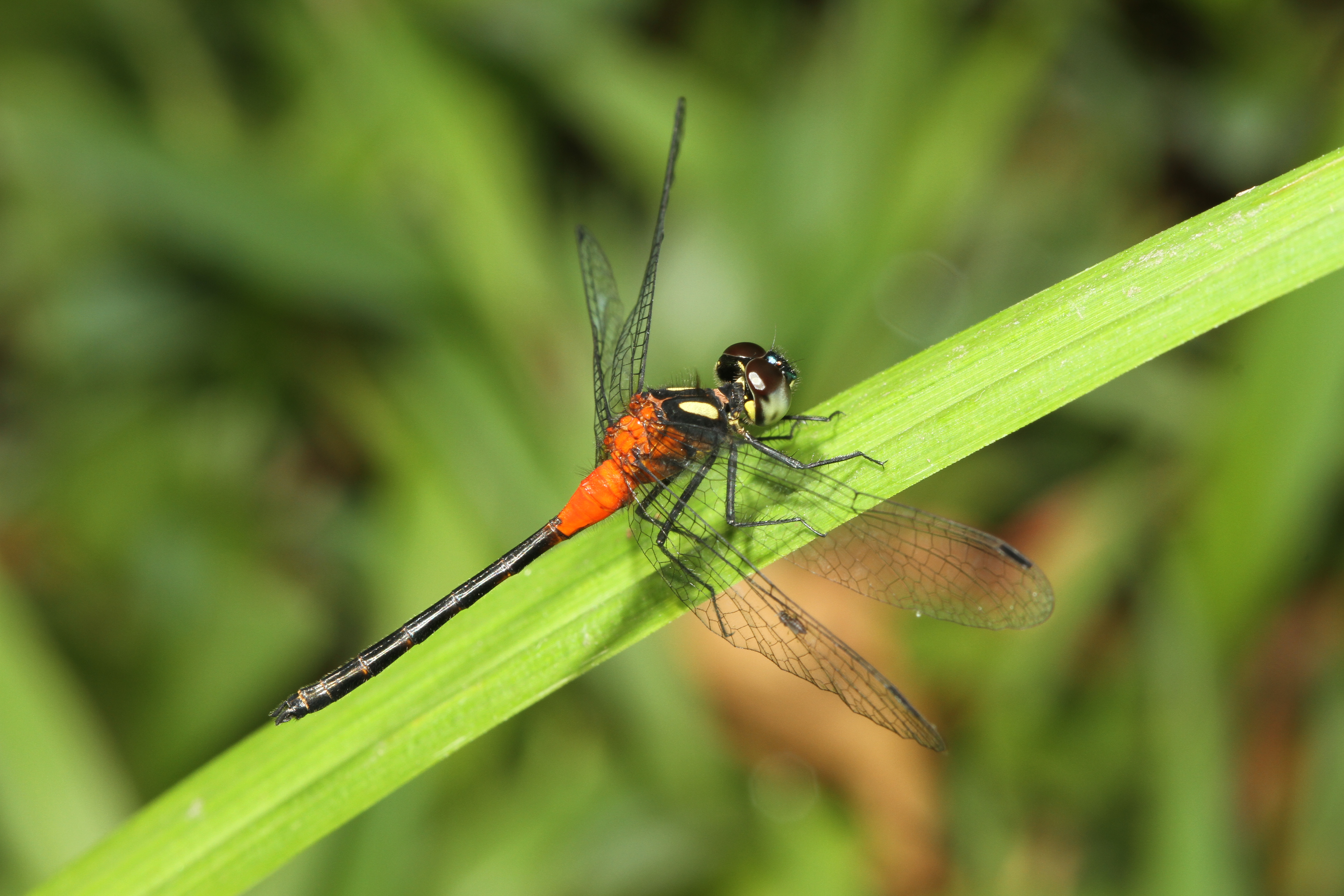
Epithemis mariae male

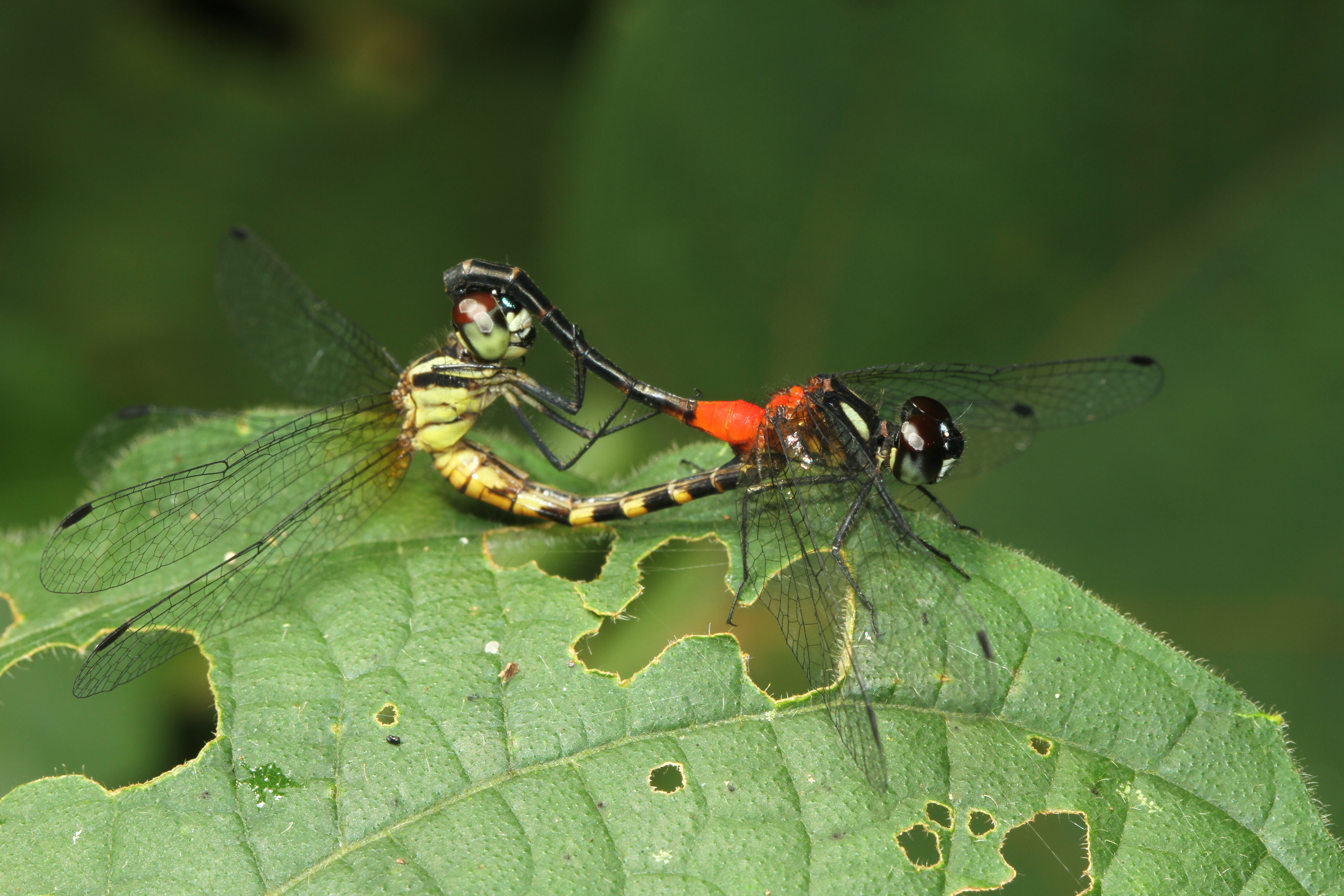
Epithemis mariae mating pair

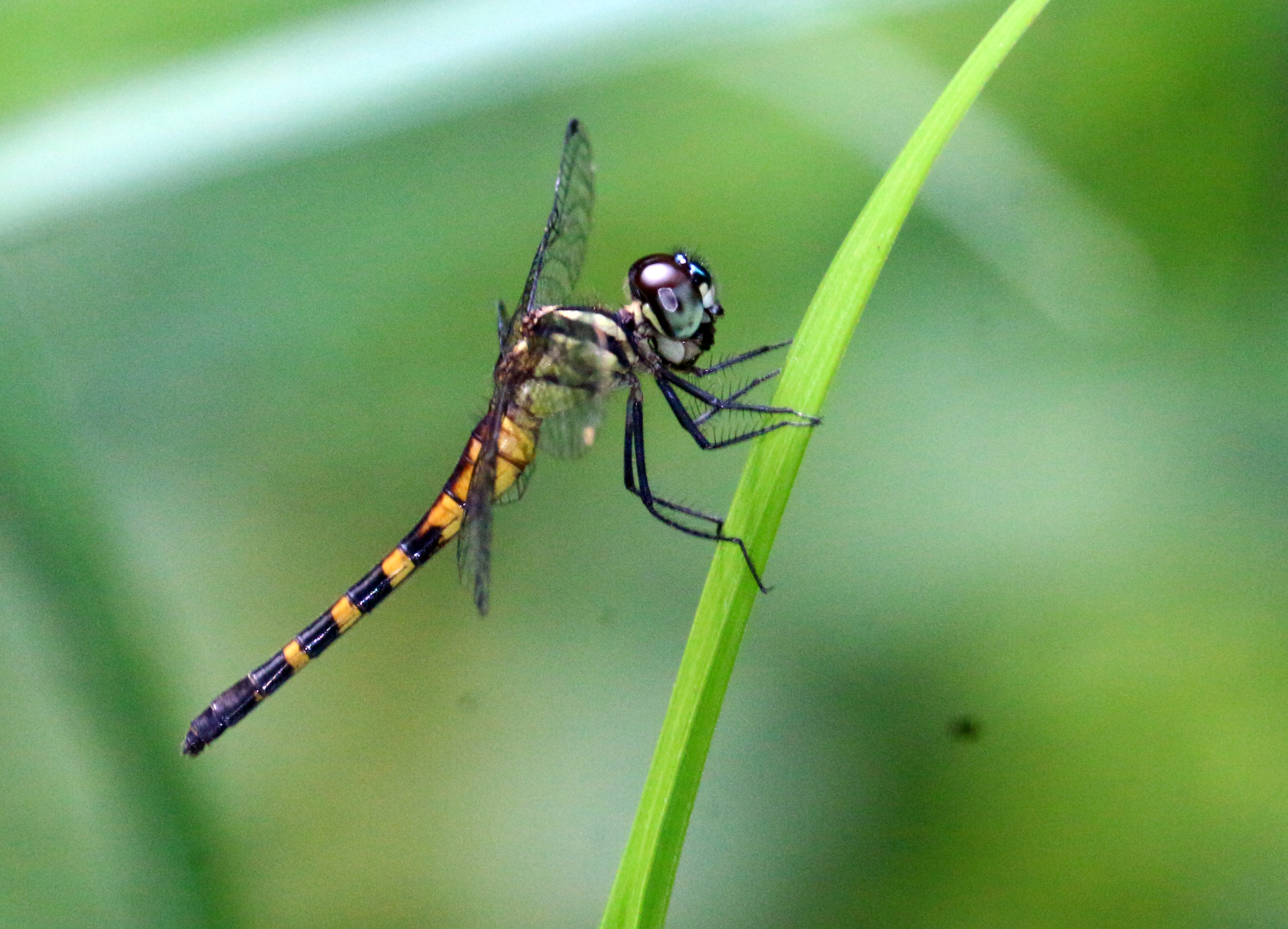
Female

==== Genus: Hydrobasileus ====
===== Species: Hydrobasileus croceus =====
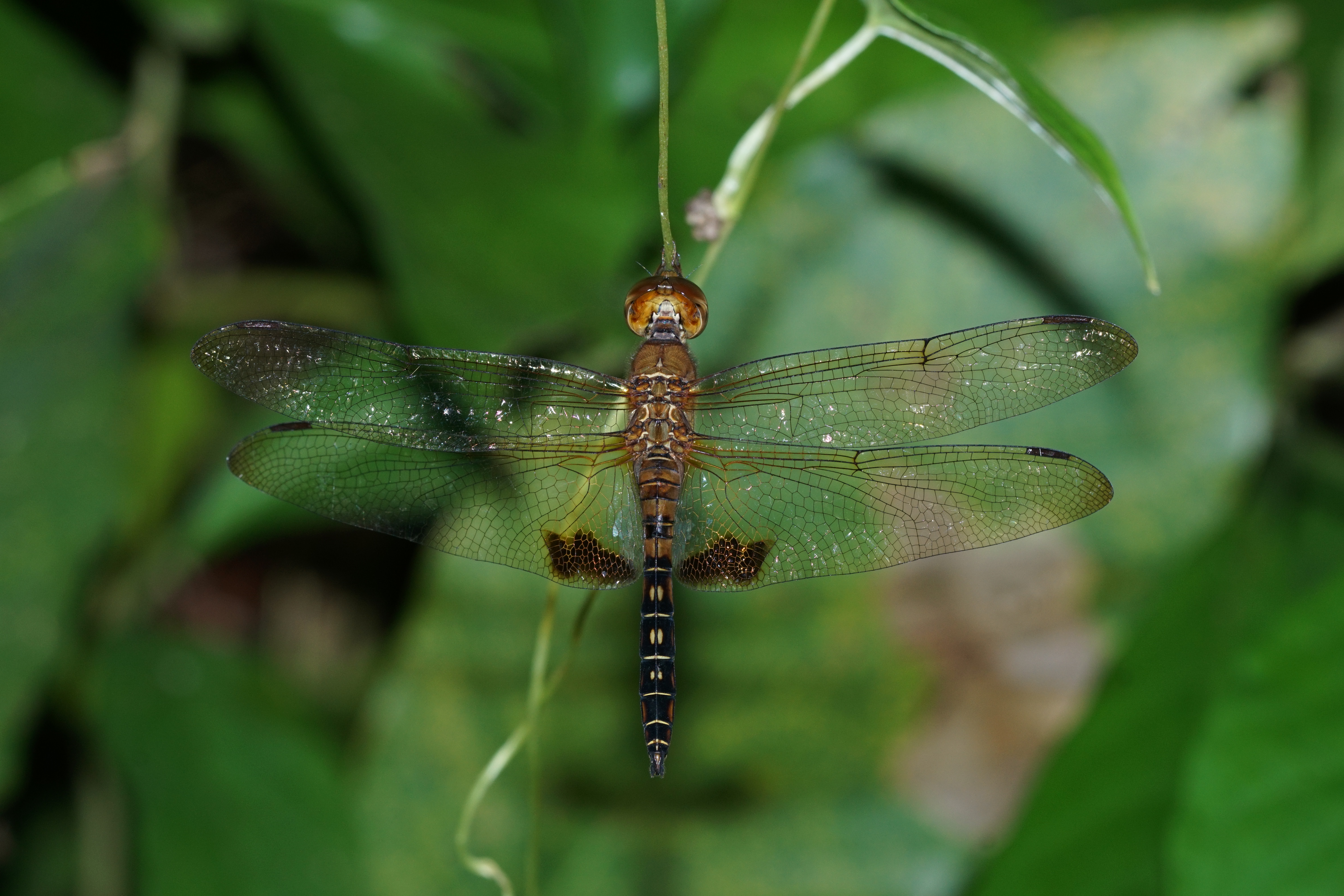
Hydrobasileus croceus male

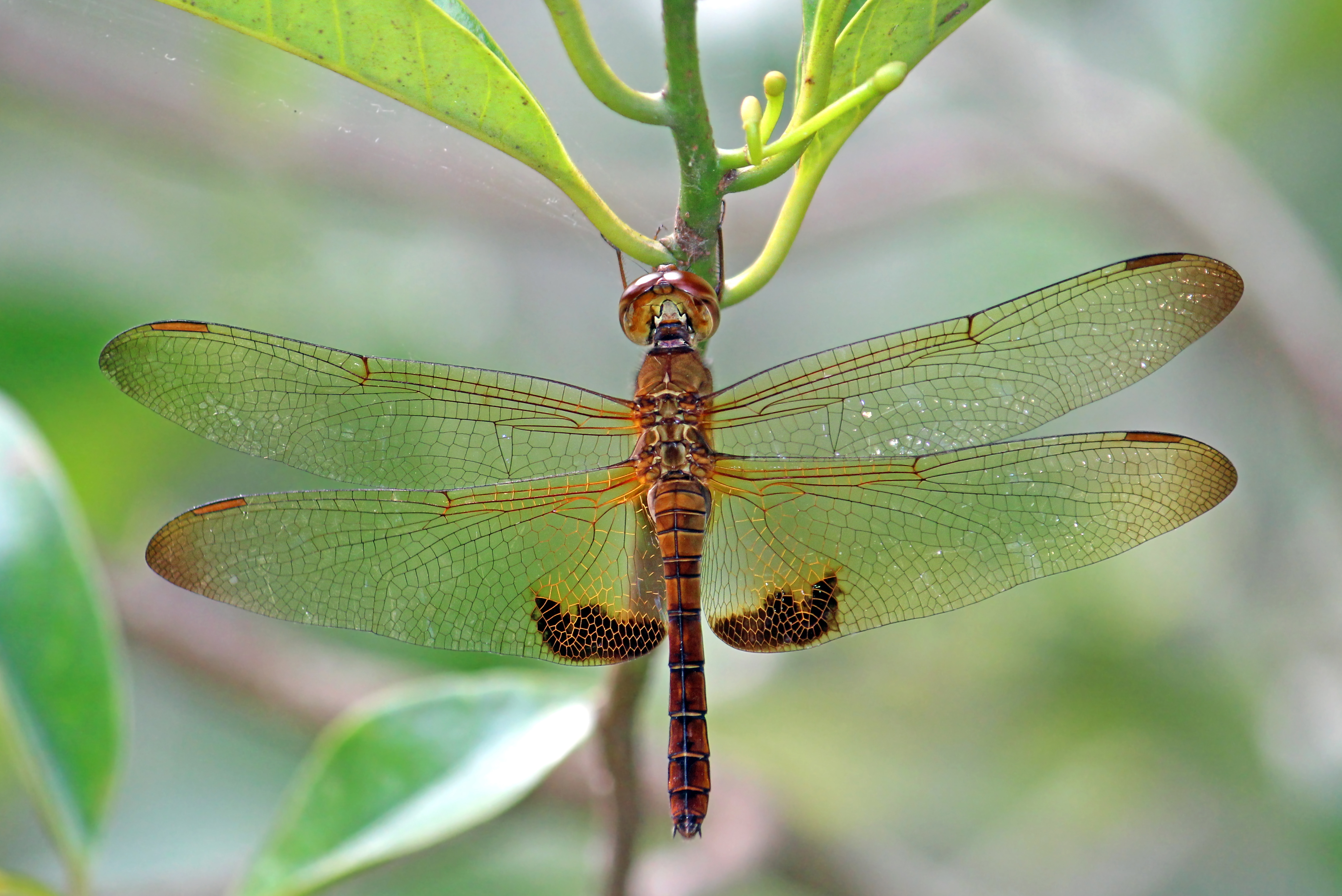
Hydrobasileus croceus female

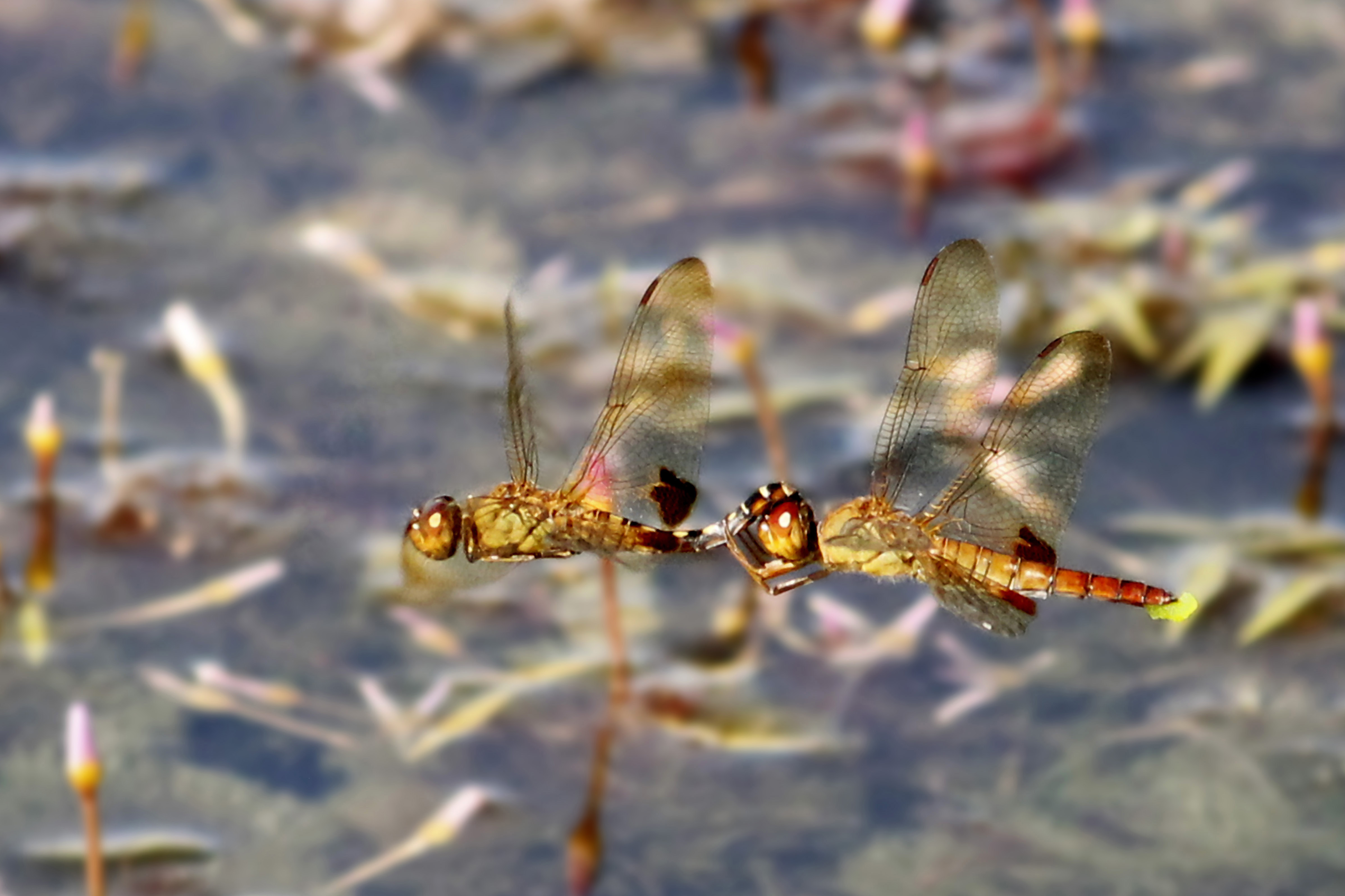
Egg laying

==== Genus: Hylaeothemis ====
===== Species: Hylaeothemis apicalis =====
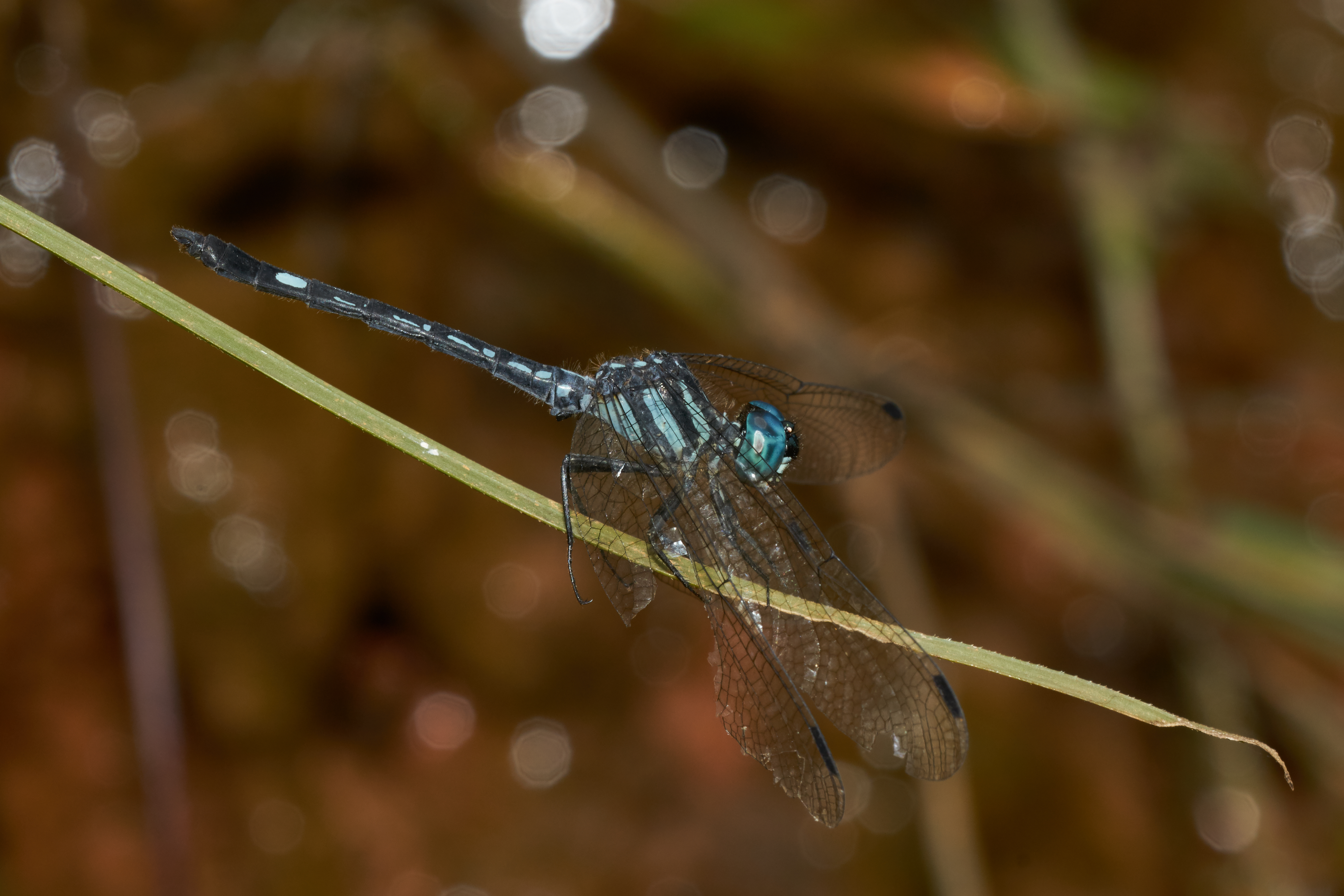
Hylaeothemis apicalis male

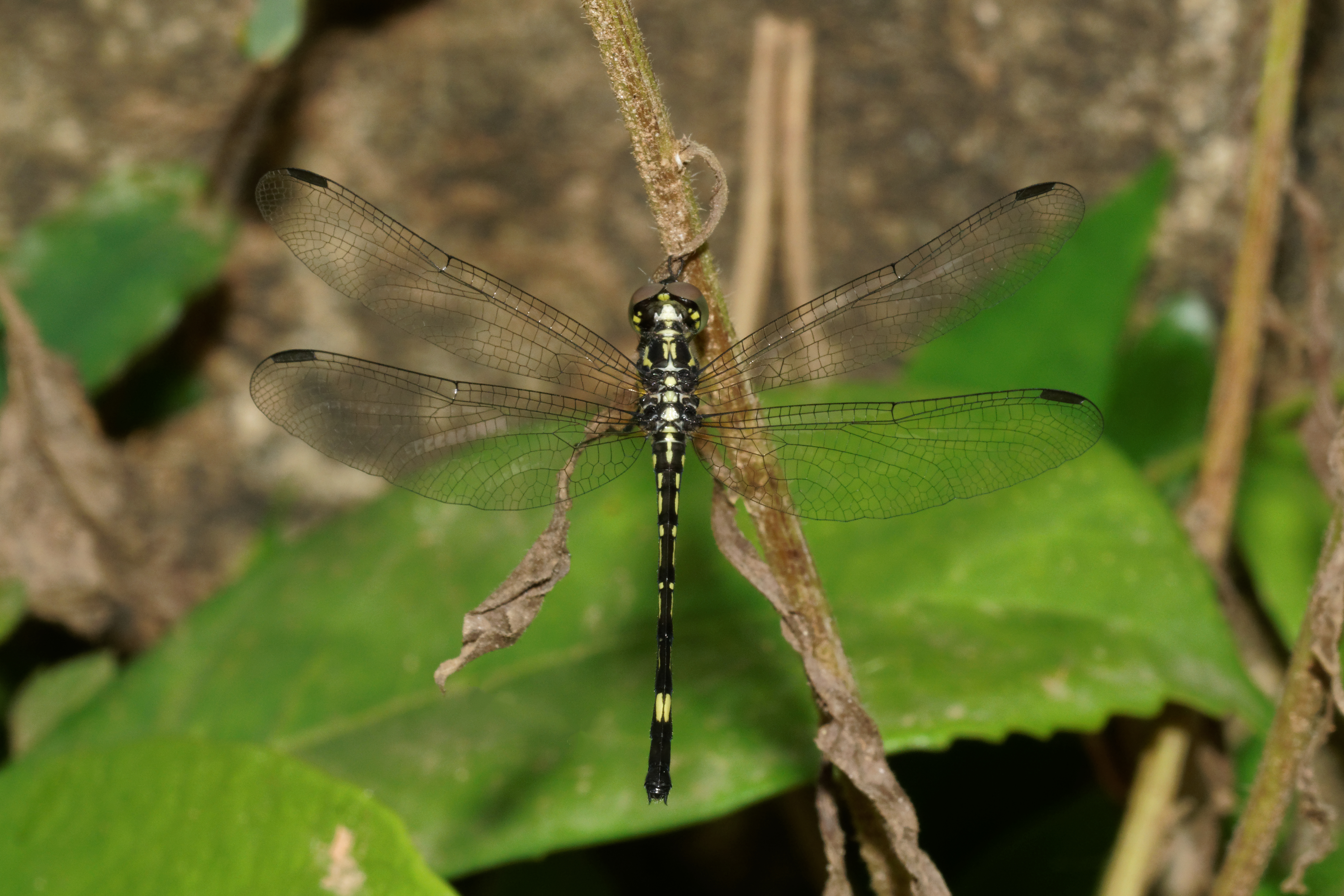
Hylaeothemis apicalis female

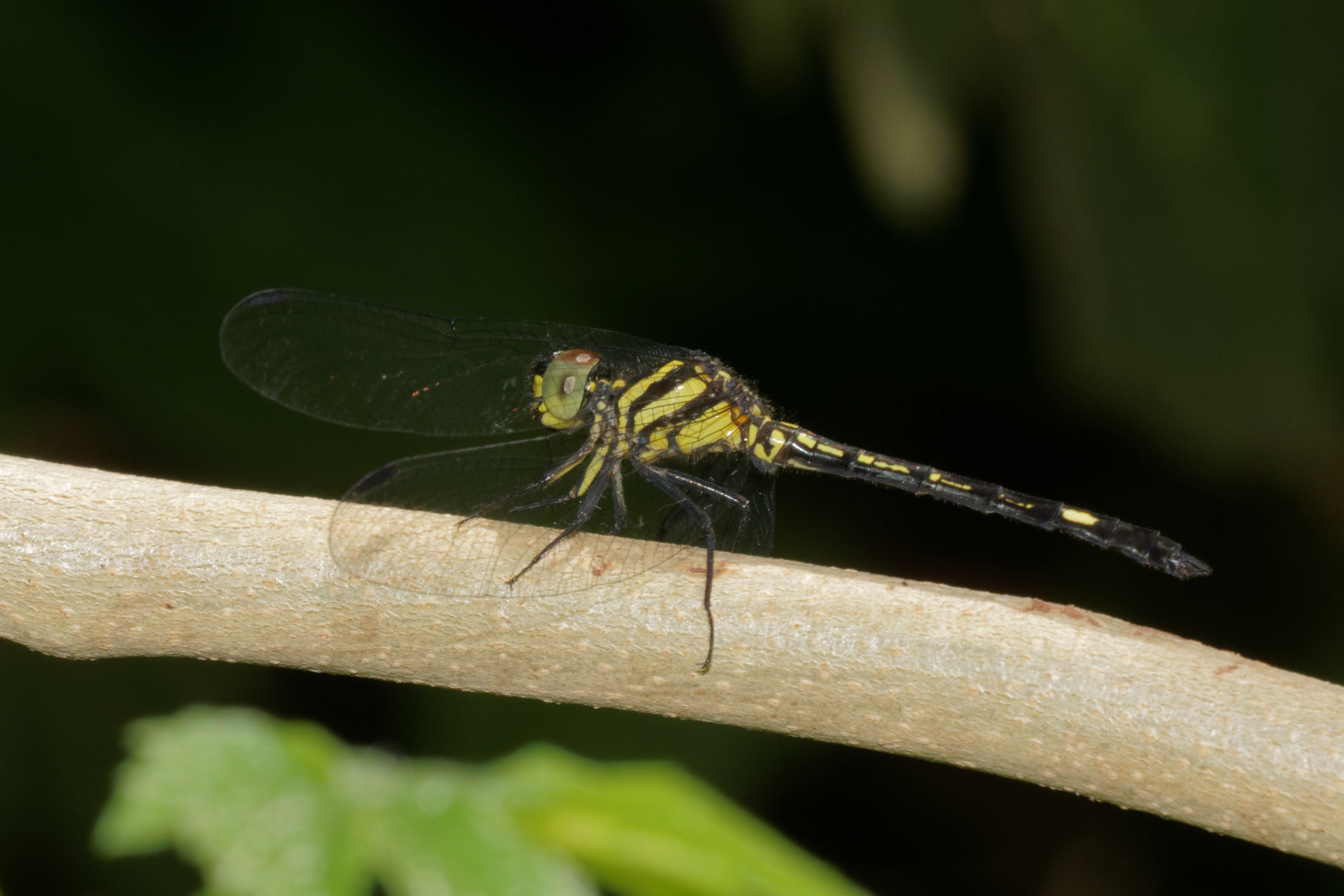
Hylaeothemis apicalis juvenile male

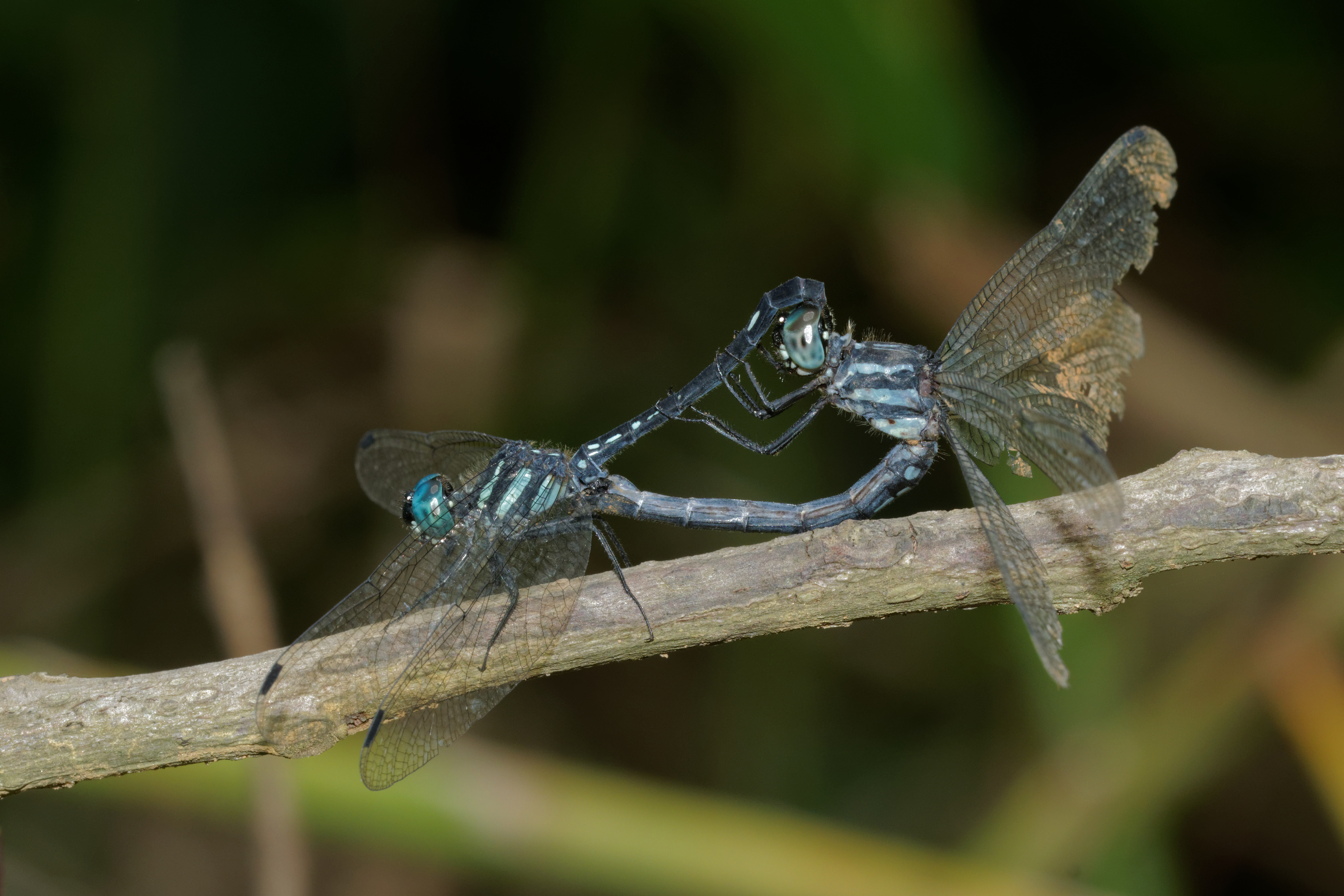
Hylaeothemis apicalis mating pair

==== Genus: Indothemis ====
===== Species: Indothemis carnatica =====
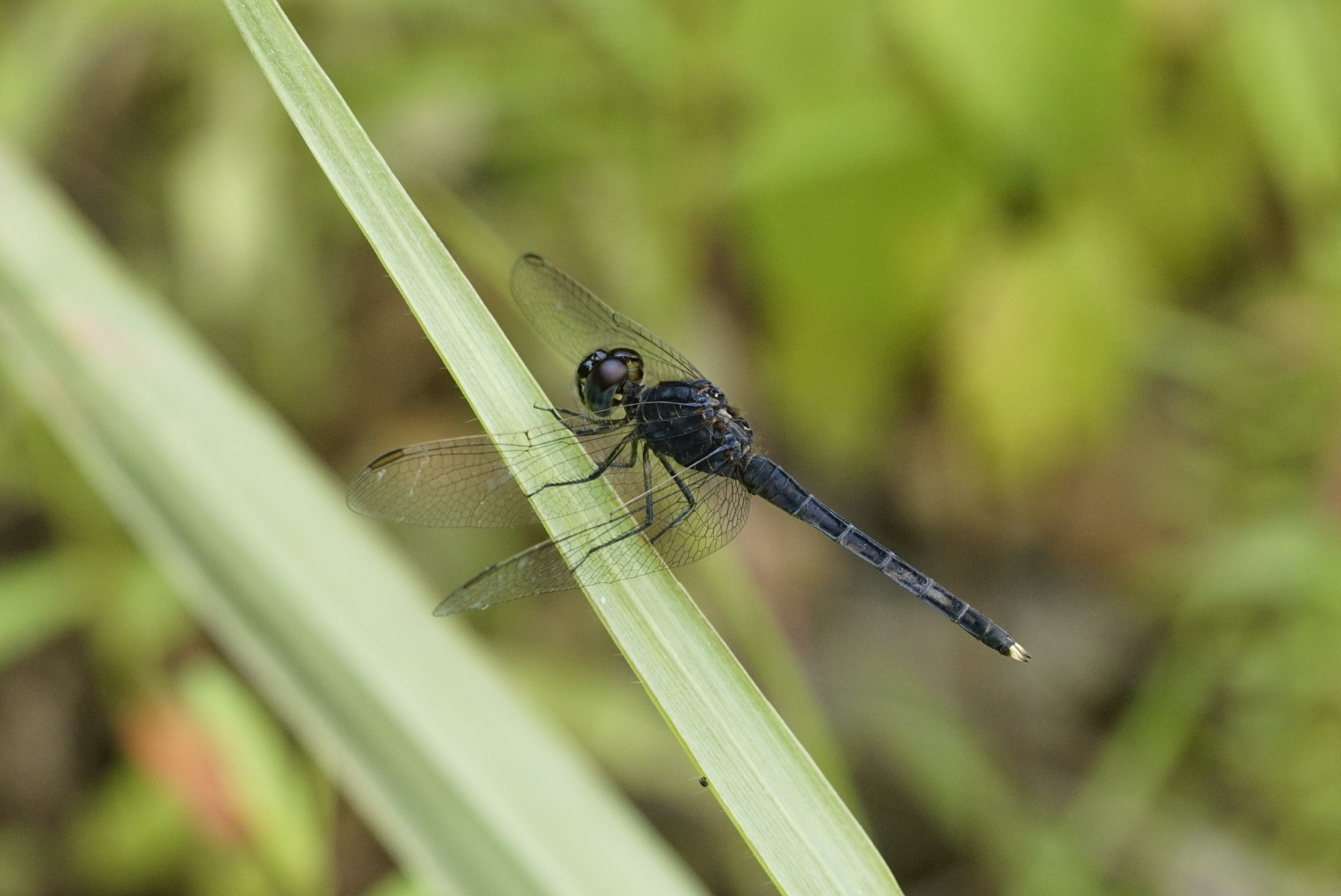
Indothemis carnatica male

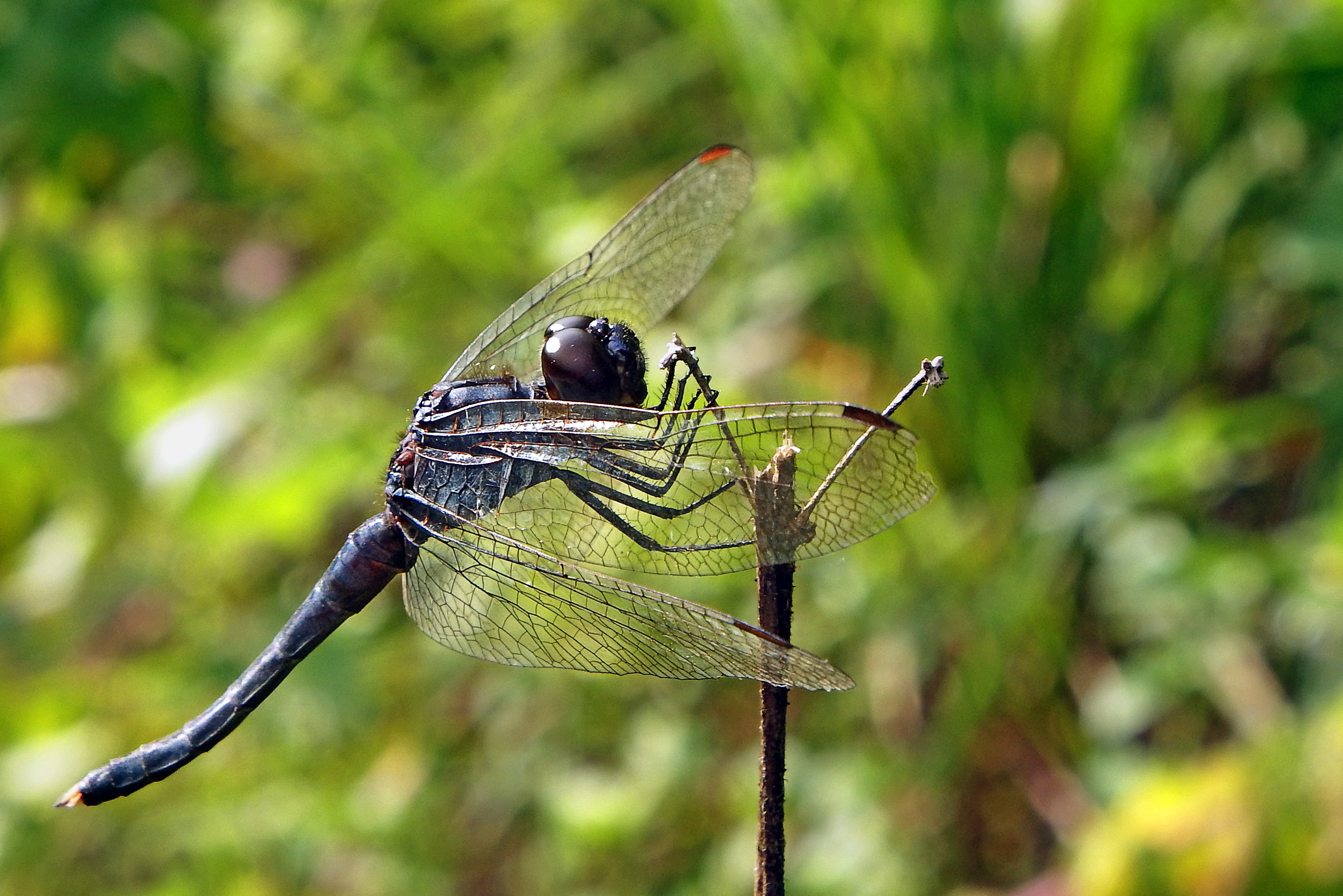
male

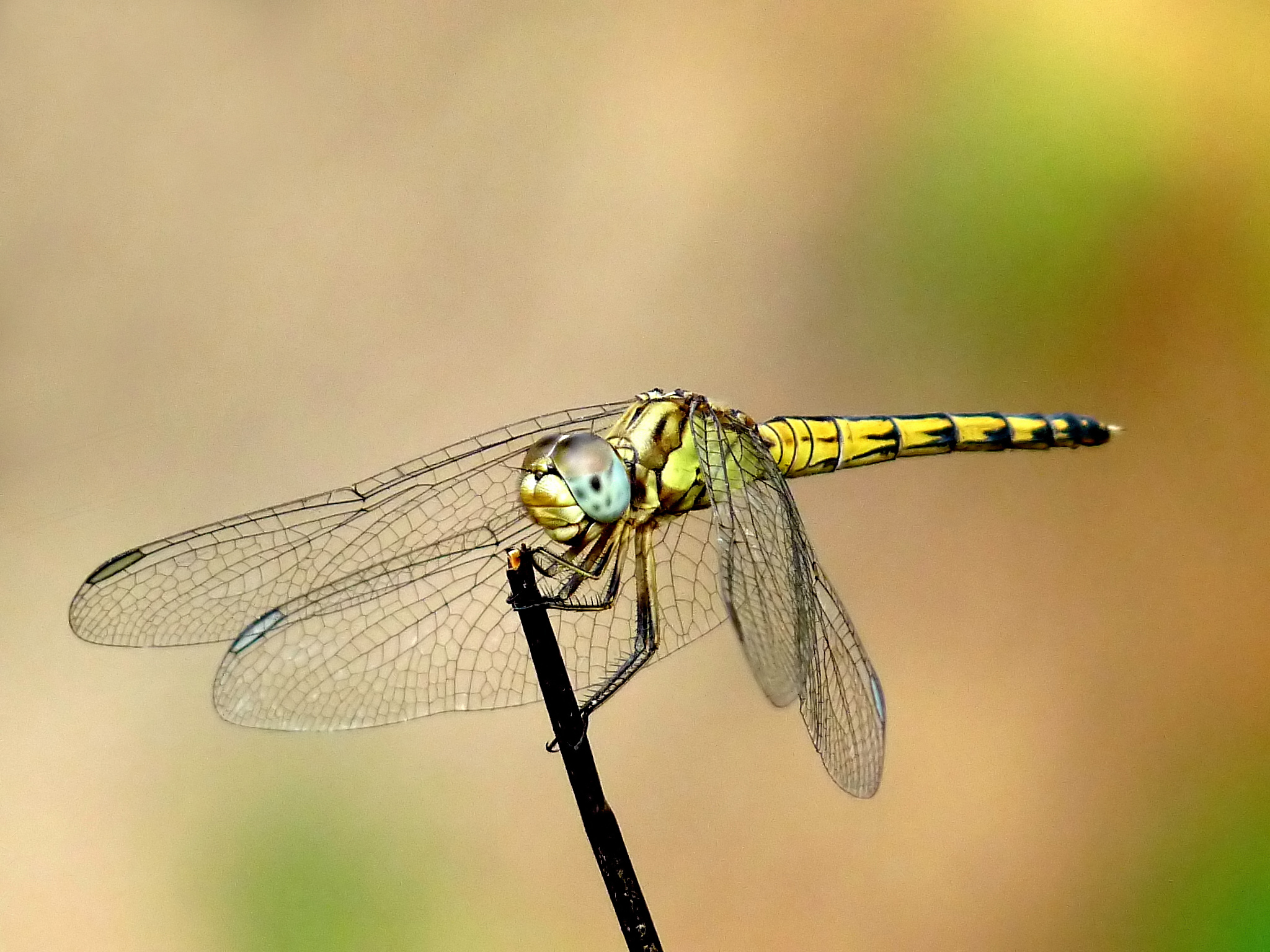
Indothemis carnatica female

===== Species: Indothemis limbata =====
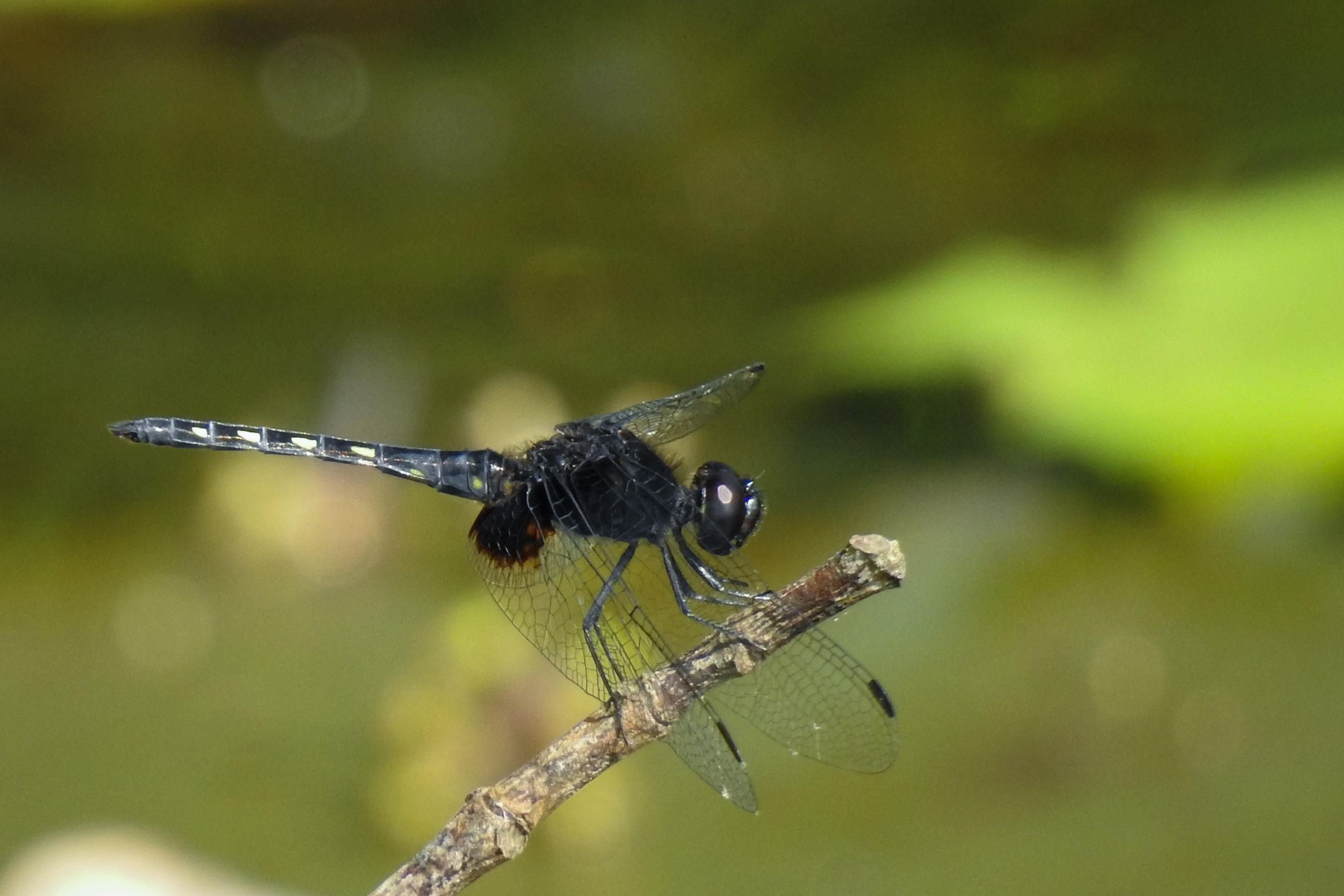
Indothemis limbata male

==== Genus: Lathrecista ====
===== Species: Lathrecista asiatica =====
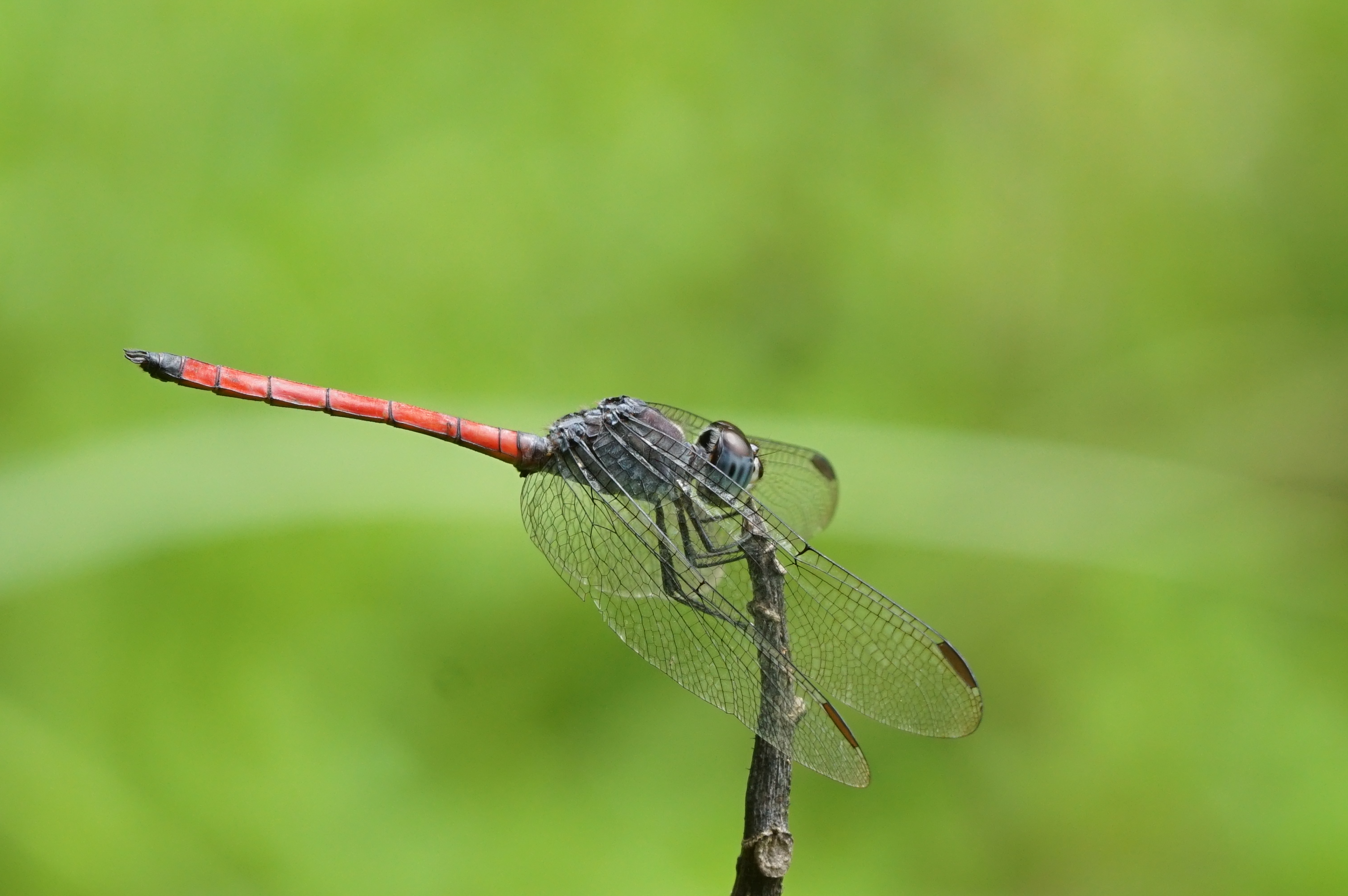
Lathrecista asiatica male

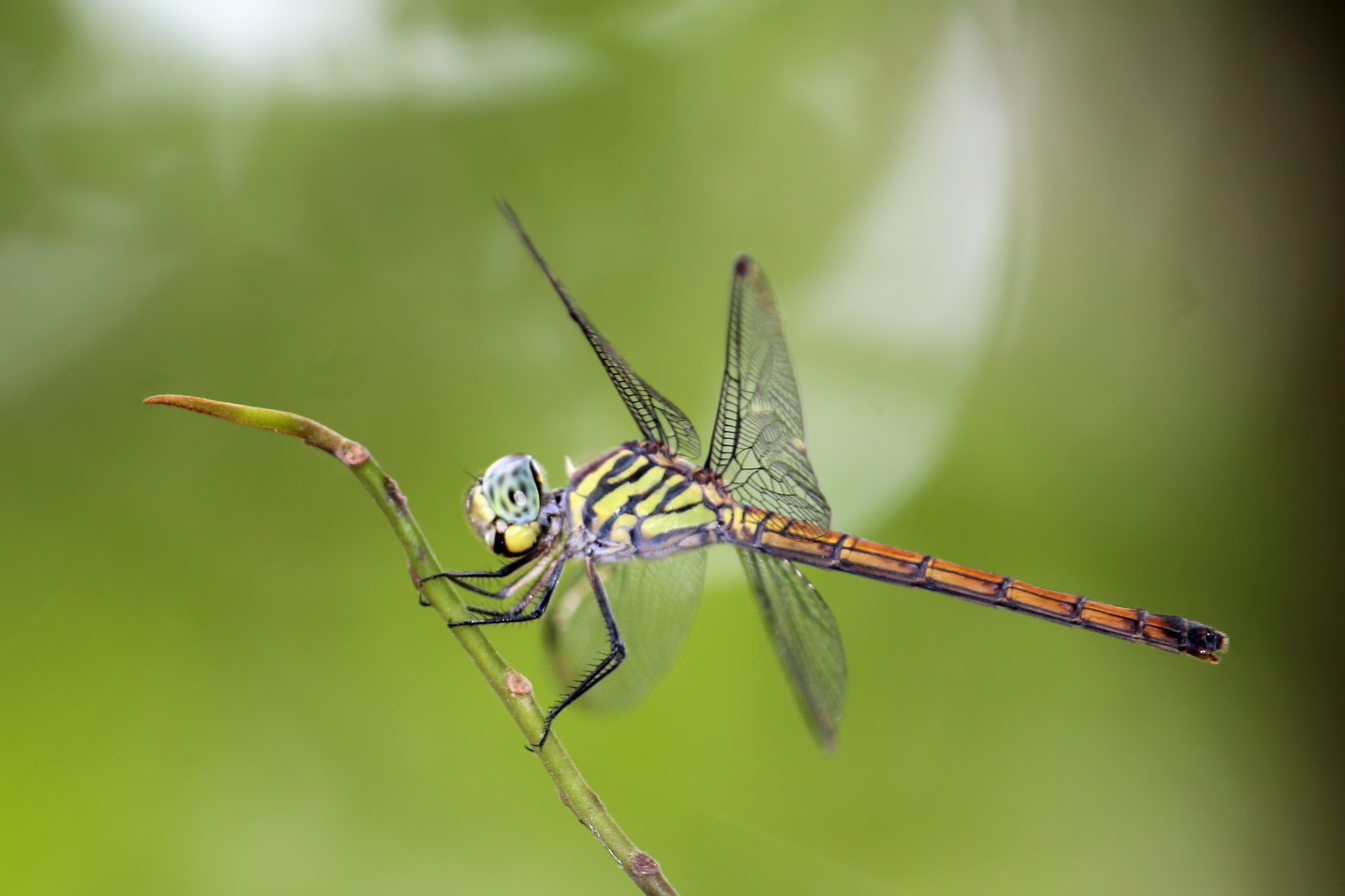
Lathrecista asiatica female

==== Genus: Lyriothemis ====
===== Species: Lyriothemis acigastra =====
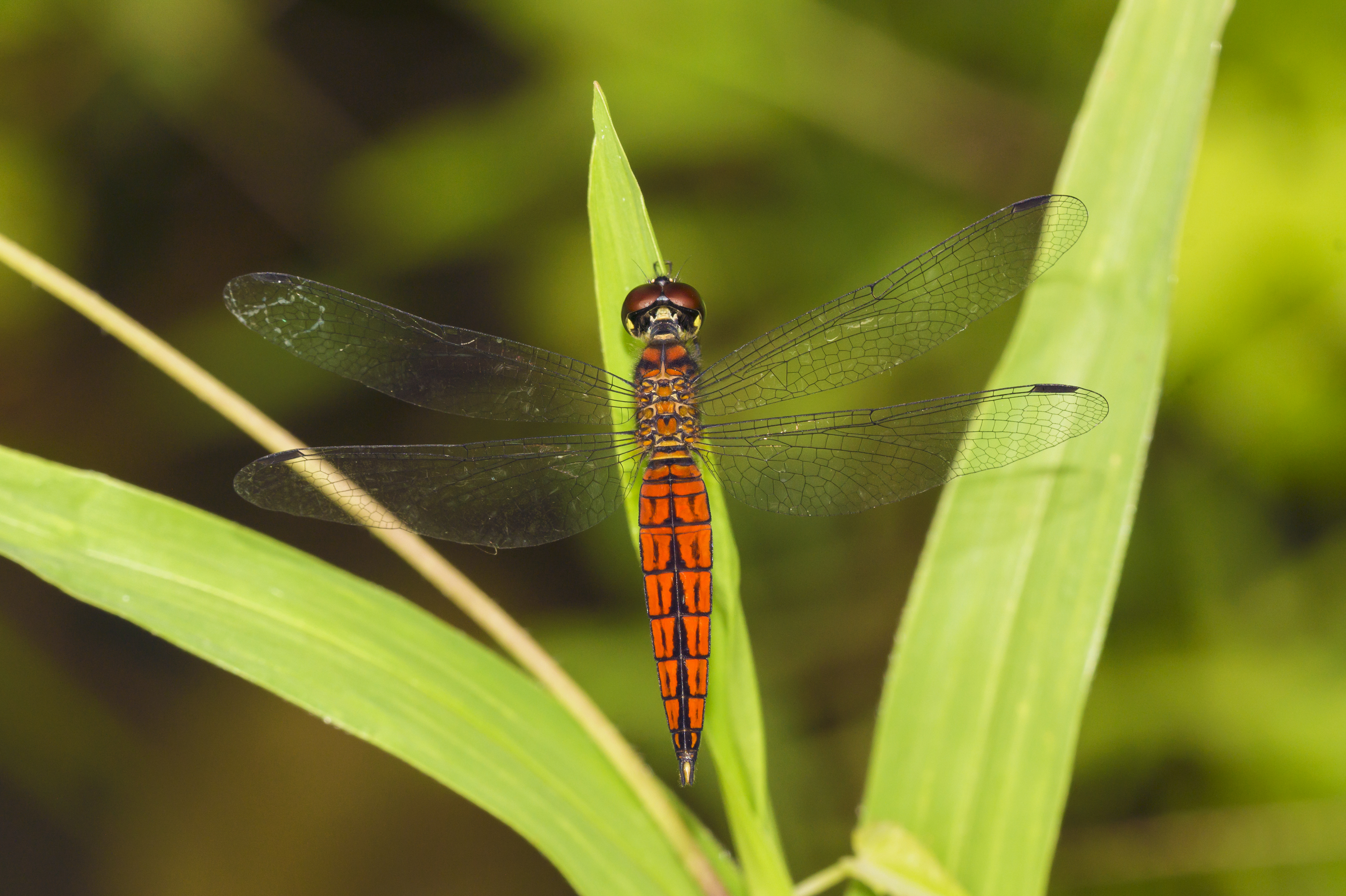
Lyriothemis acigastra male

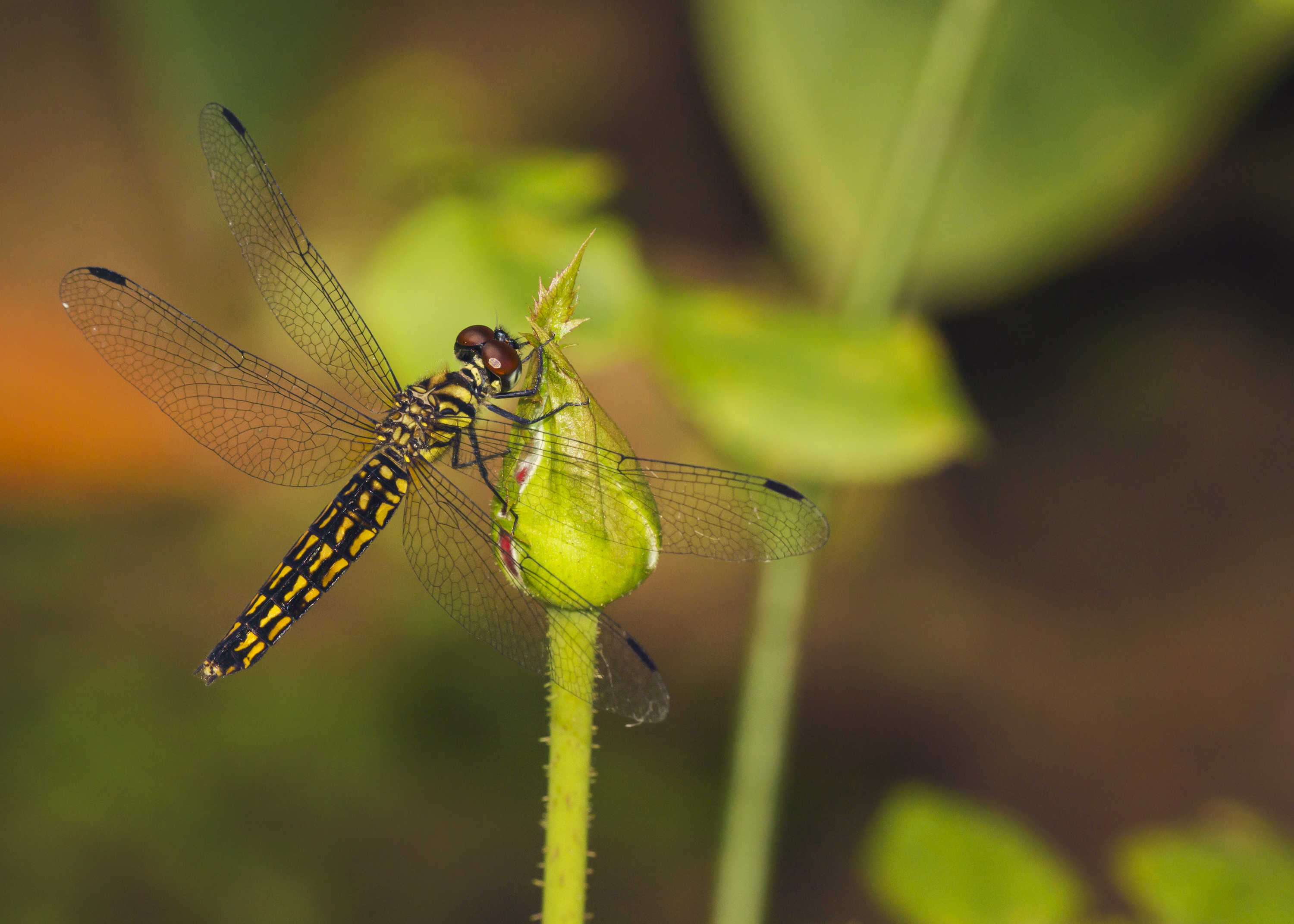
Lyriothemis acigastra female

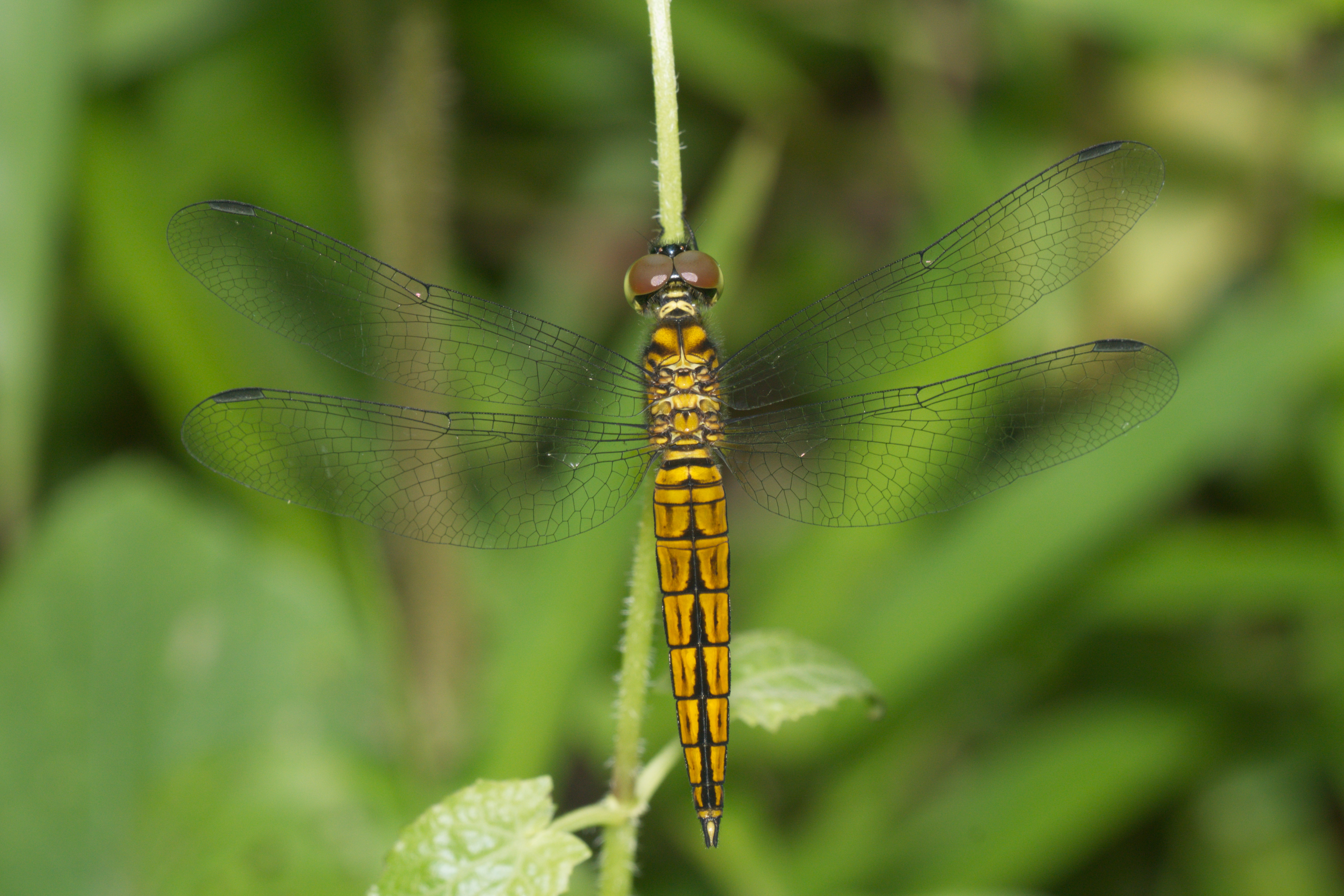
Lyriothemis acigastra juvenile male

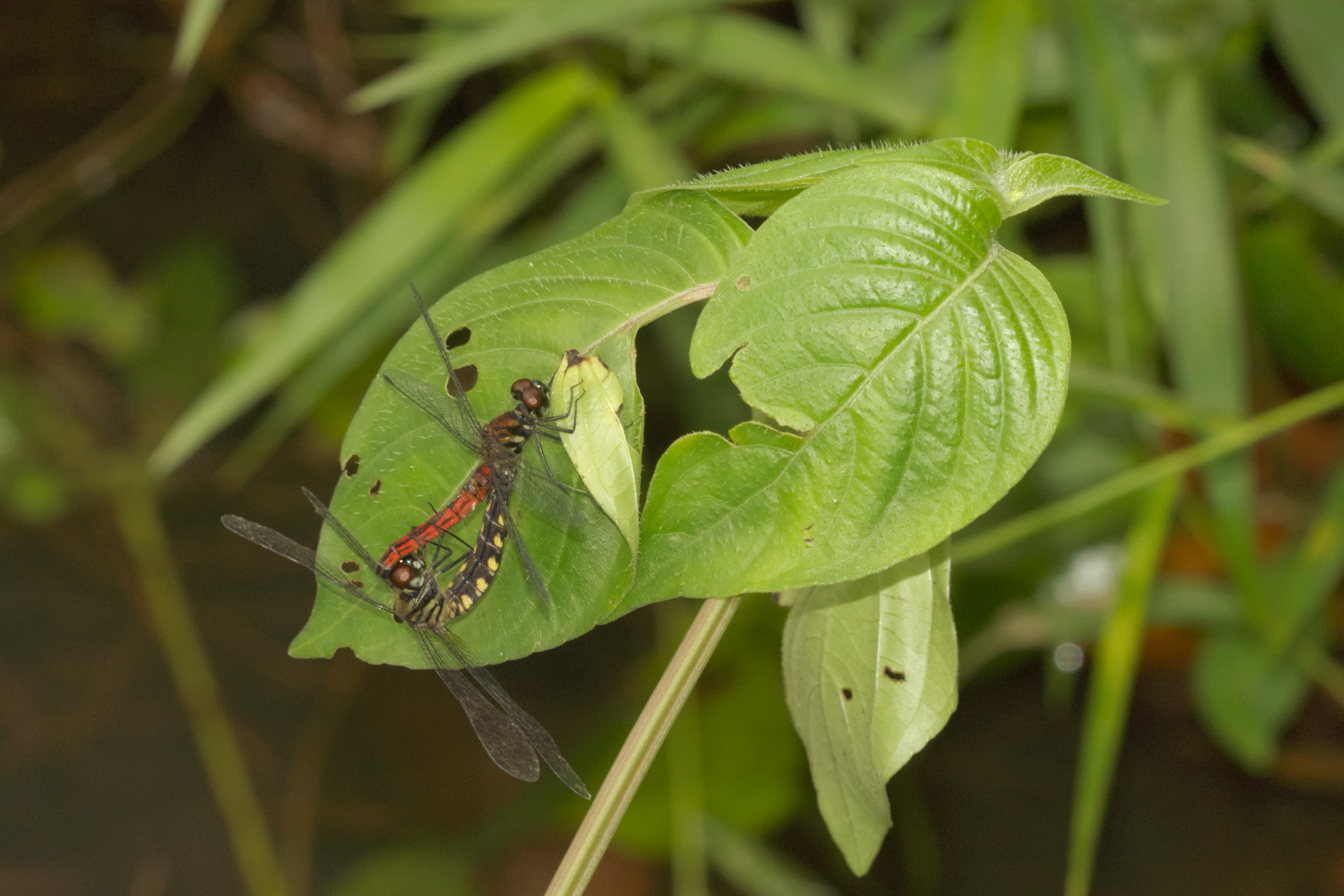
Lyriothemis acigastra mating pair

===== Species: Lyriothemis tricolor =====
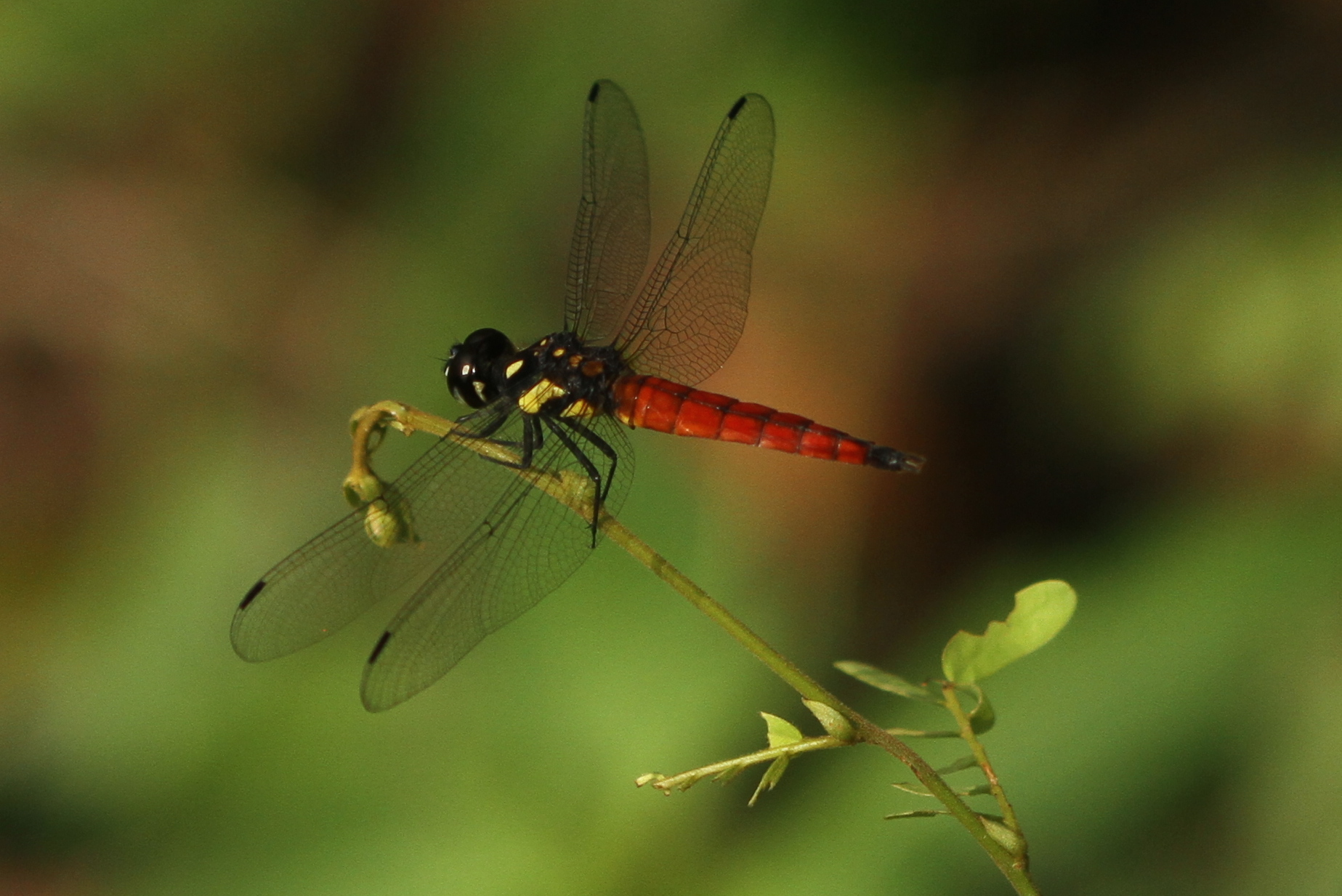
Lyriothemis tricolor male

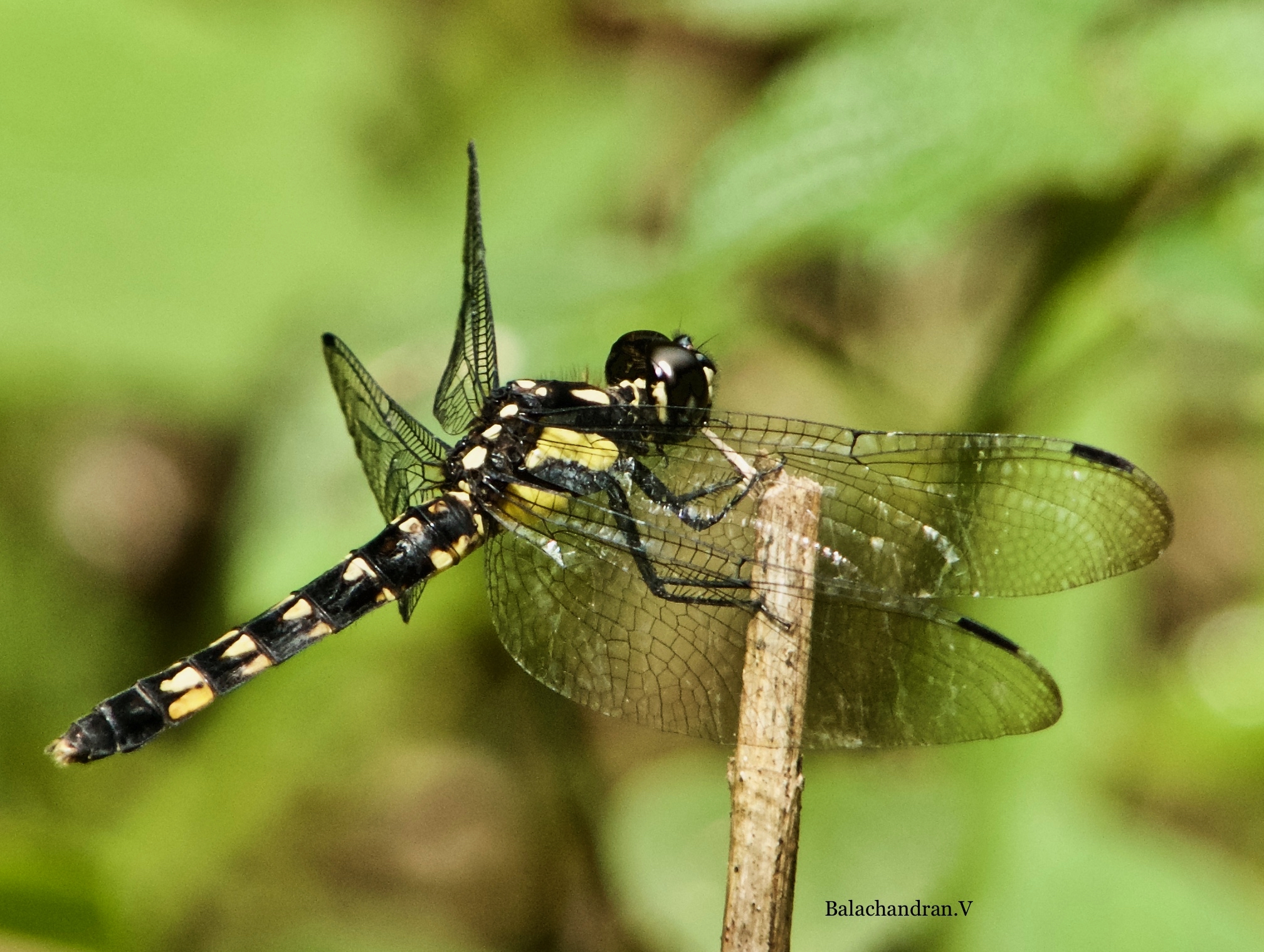
Lyriothemis tricolor female

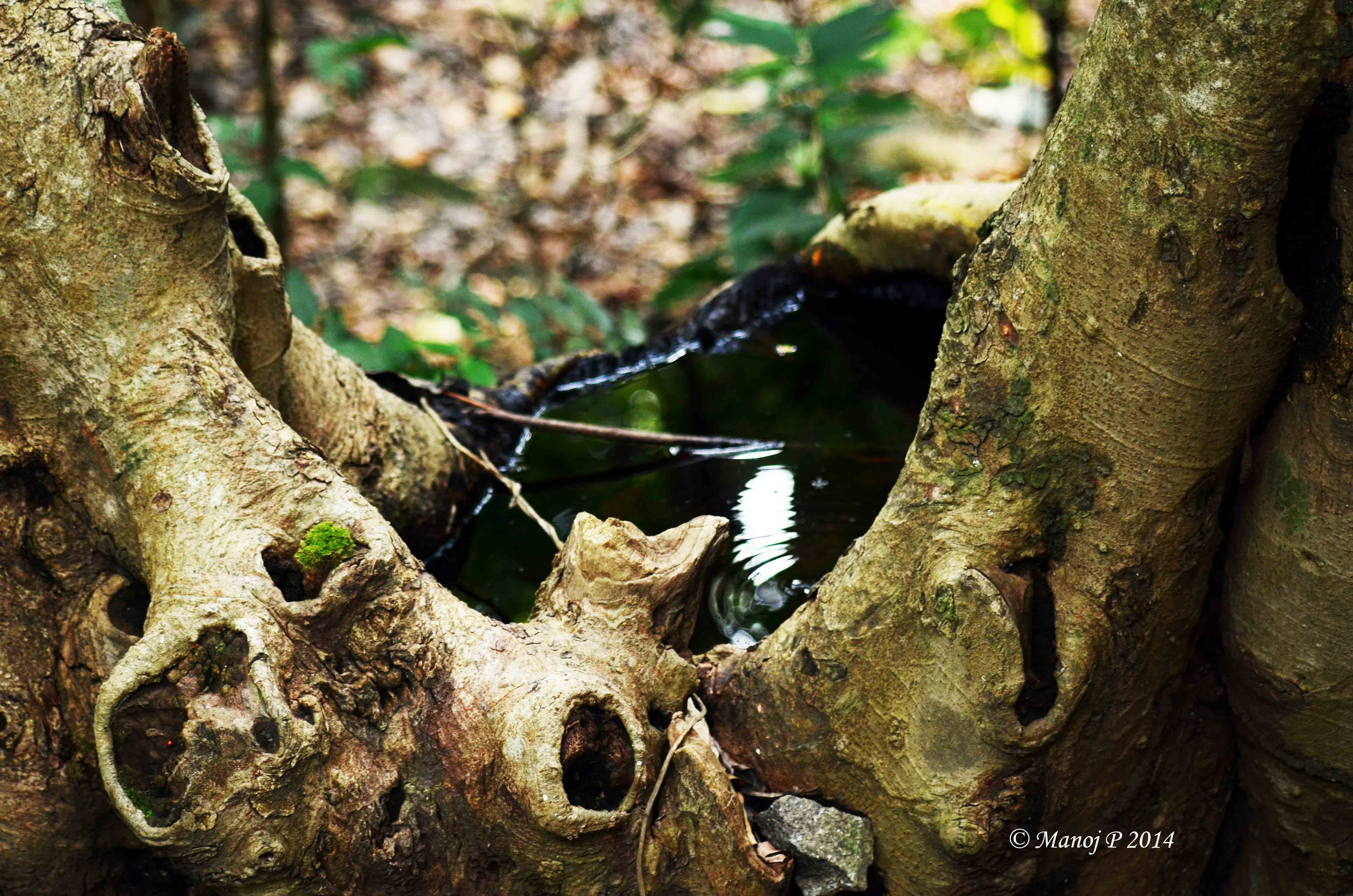
Breading habitat

==== Genus: Macrodiplax ====
===== Species: Macrodiplax cora =====
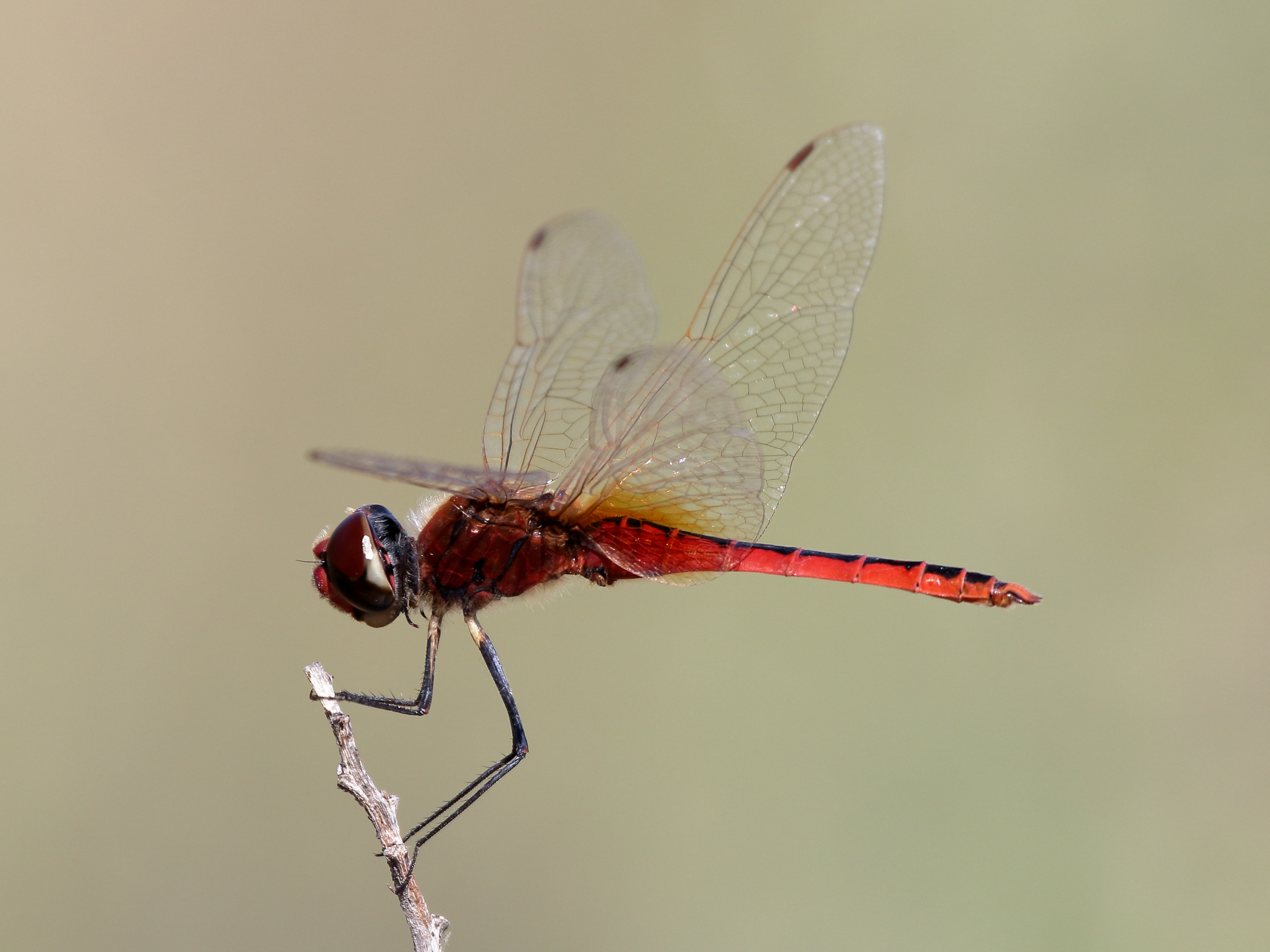
male

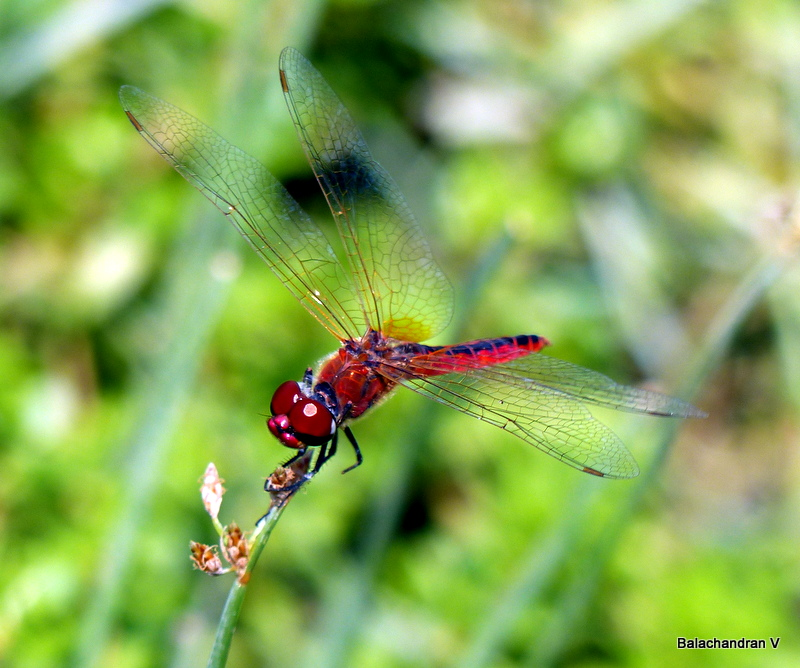
Macrodiplax cora male

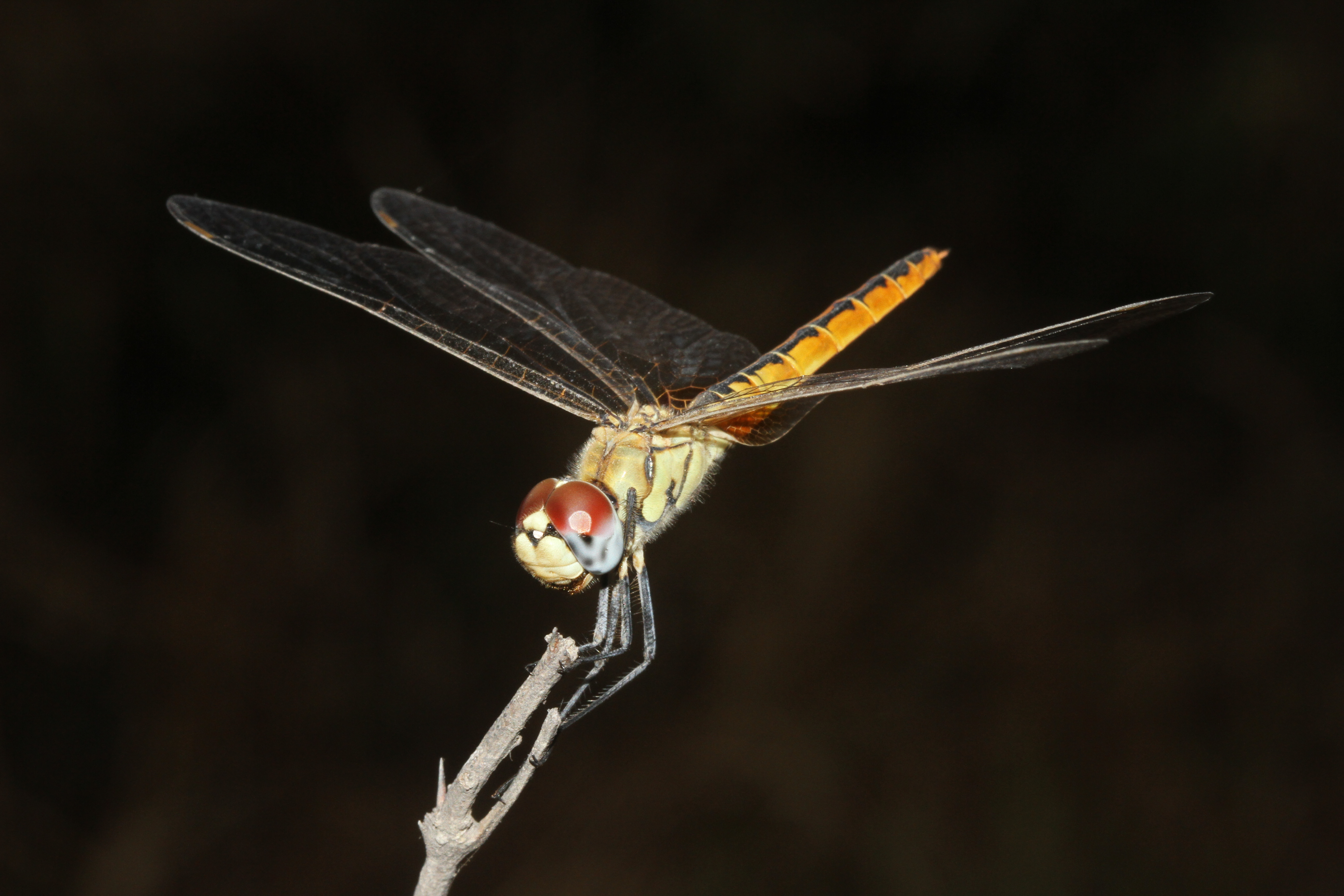
Macrodiplax cora female

==== Genus: Neurothemis ====
===== Species: Neurothemis fulvia =====
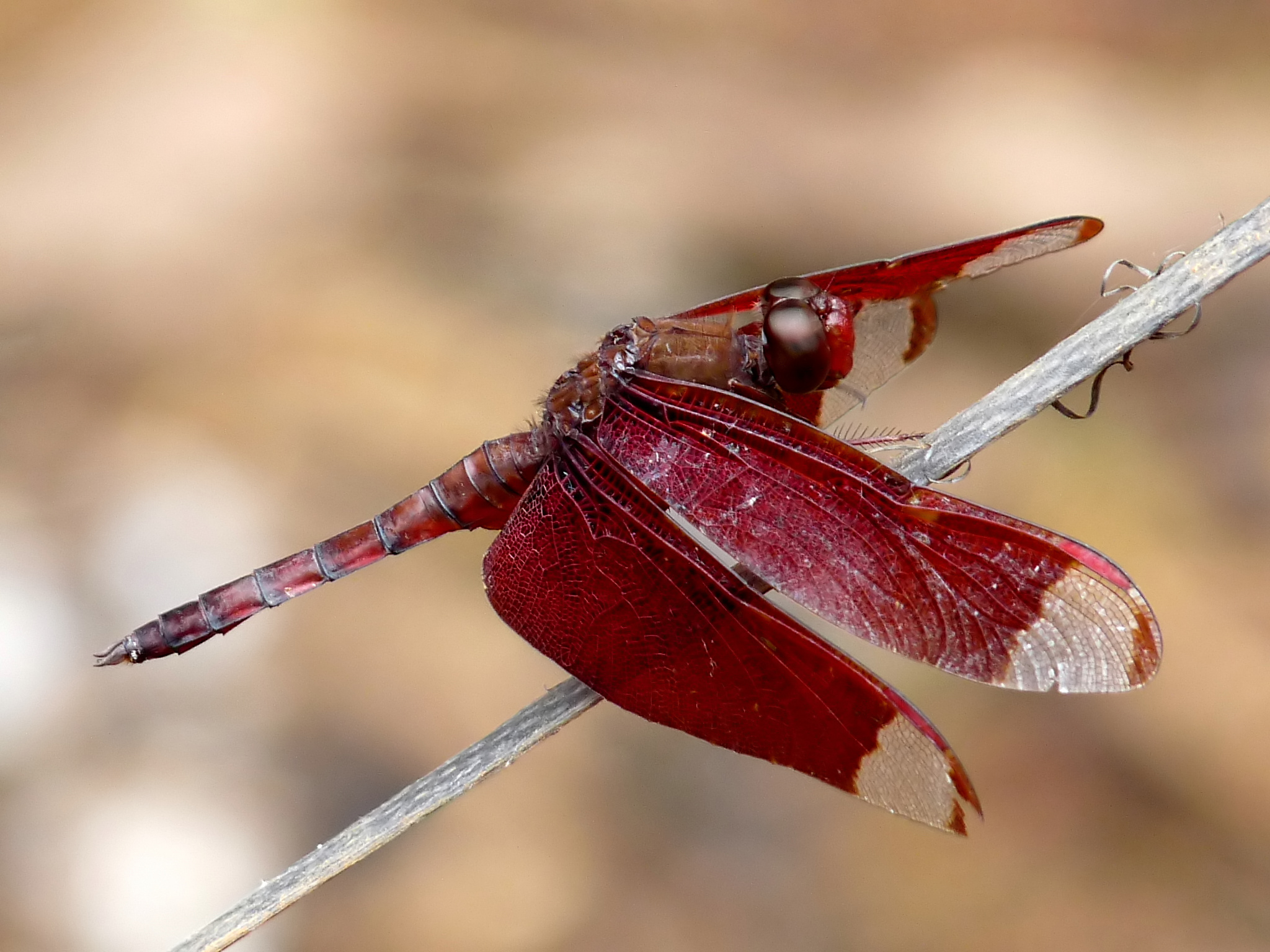
Neurothemis fulvia male

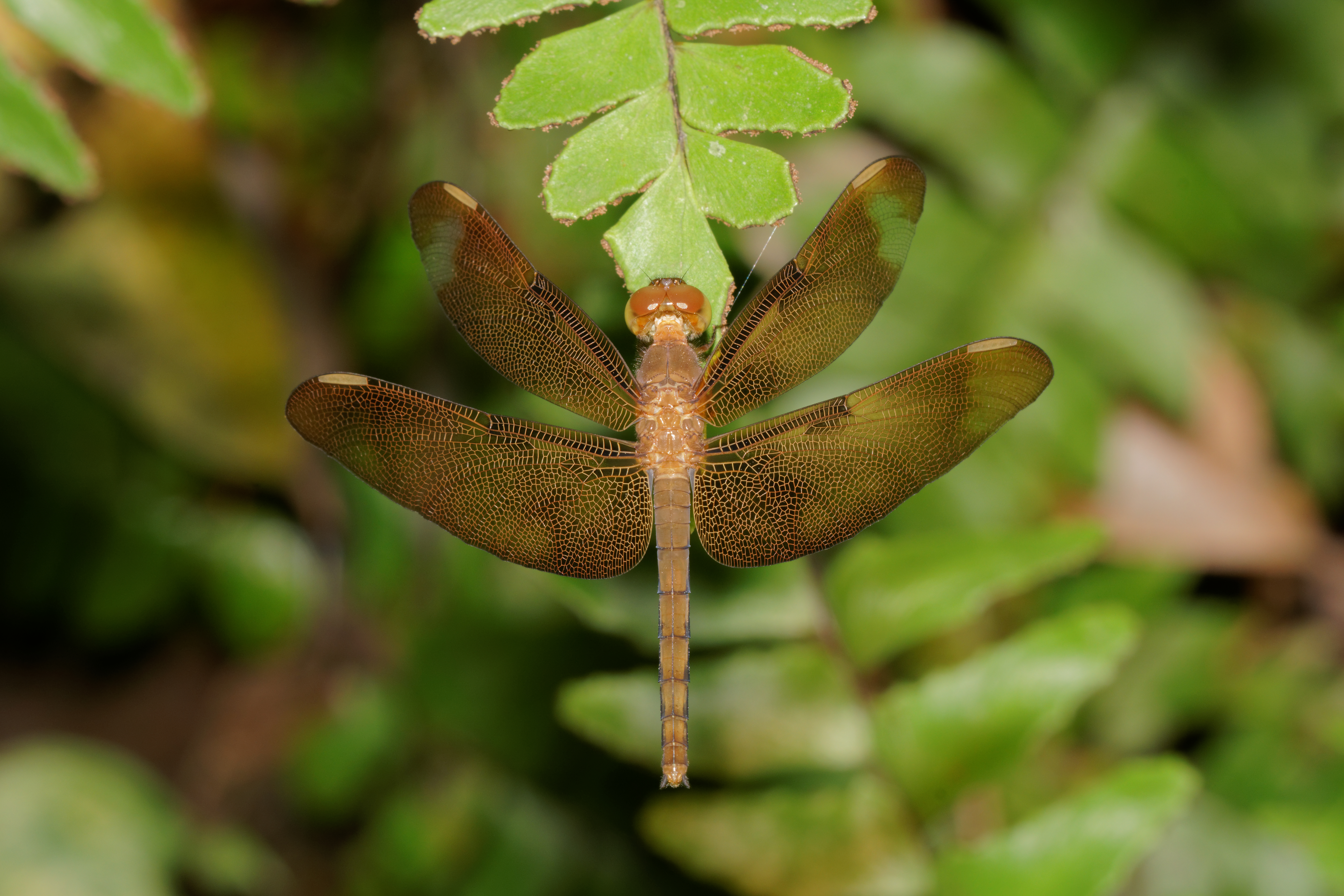
Neurothemis fulvia female

===== Species: Neurothemis intermedia =====
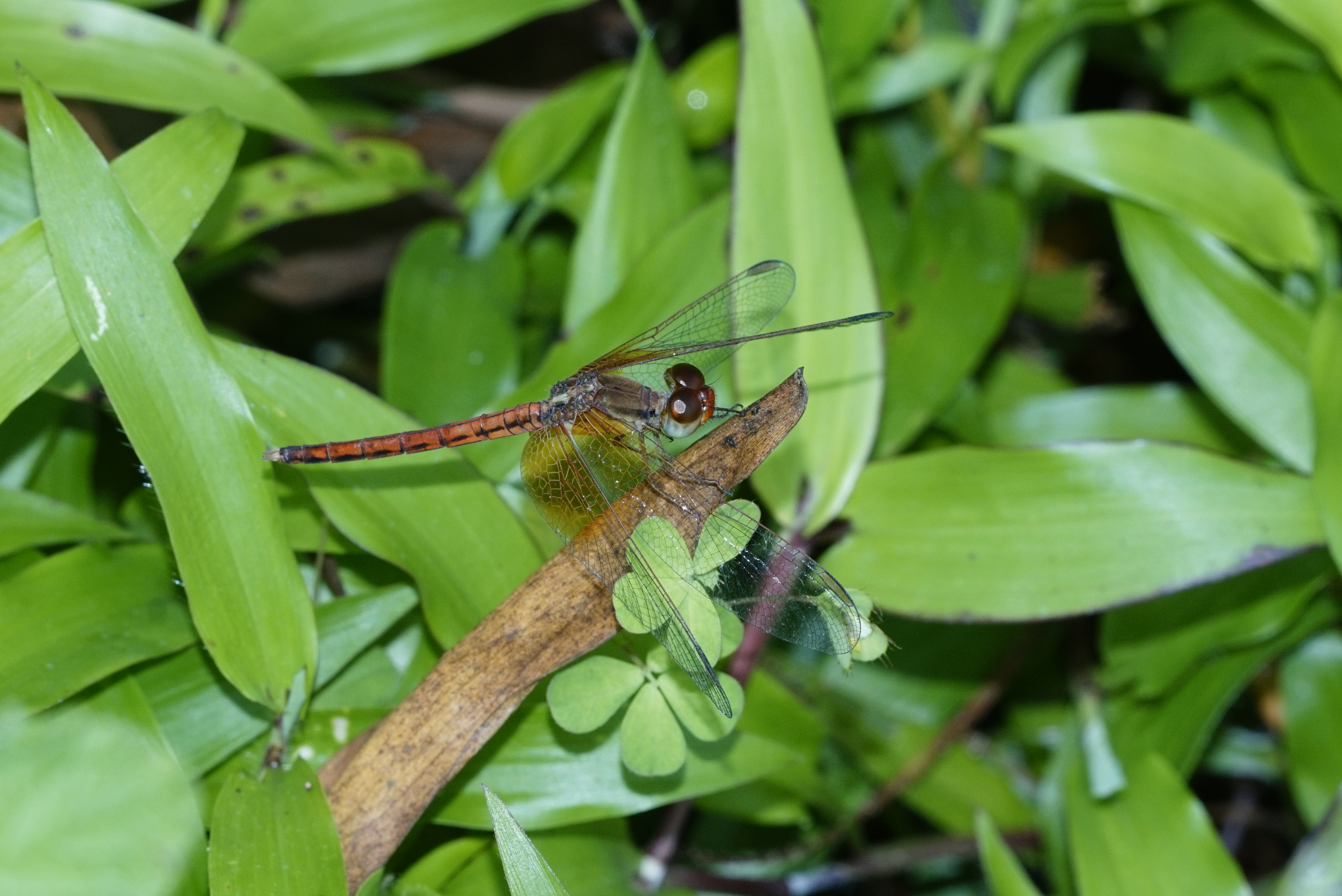
Neurothemis intermedia male

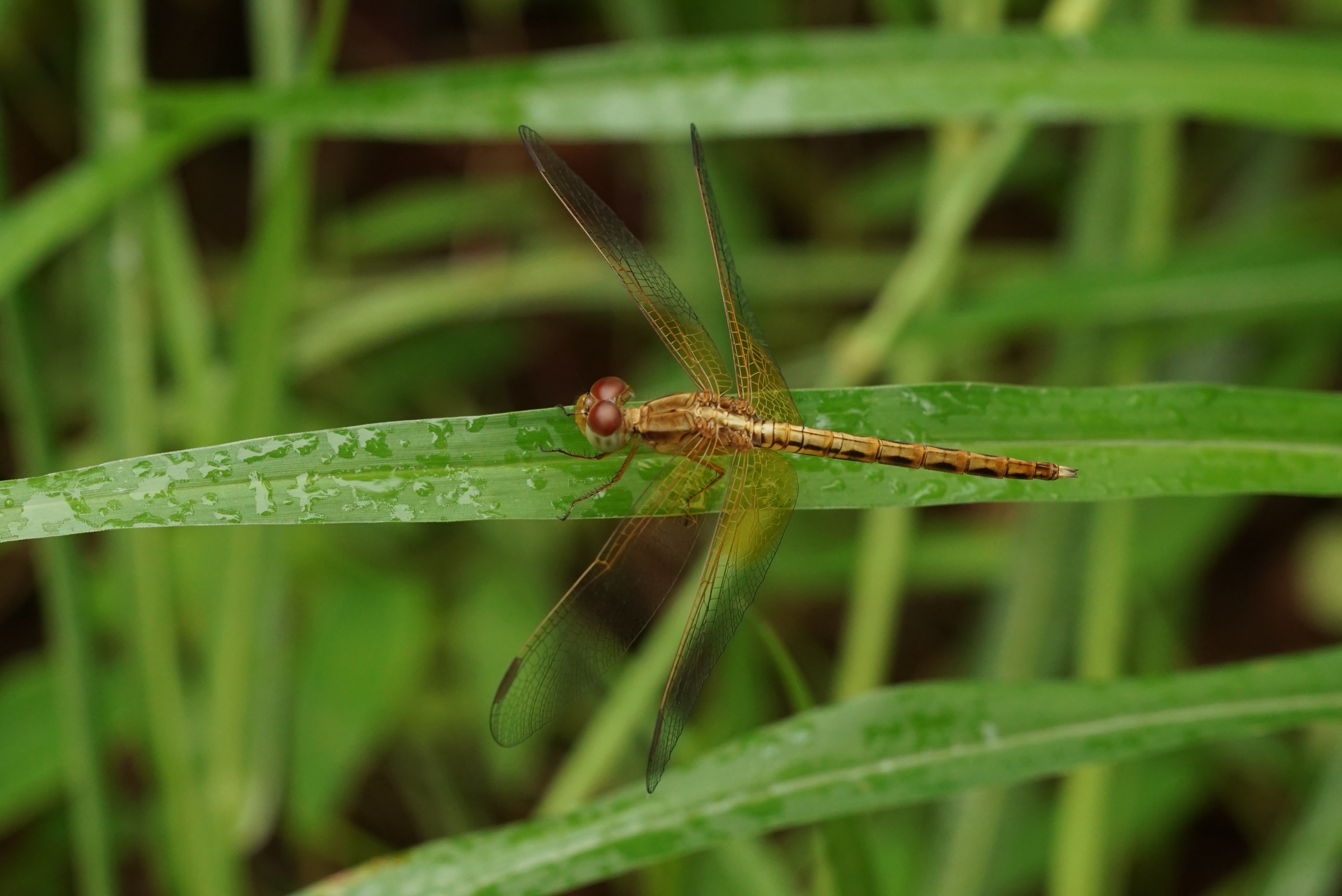
Neurothemis intermedia sub-adult male

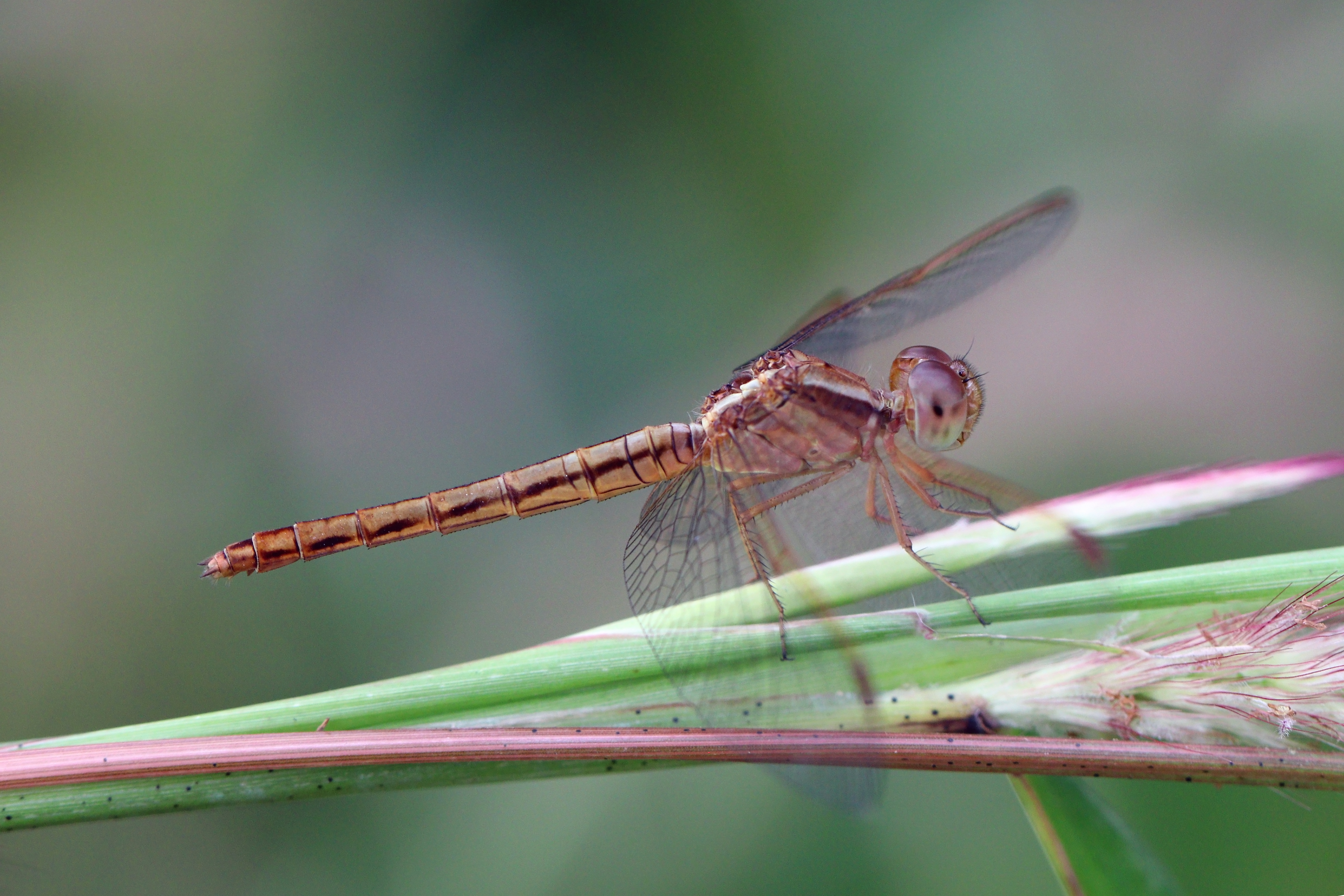
Neurothemis intermedia female

===== Species: Neurothemis tullia =====
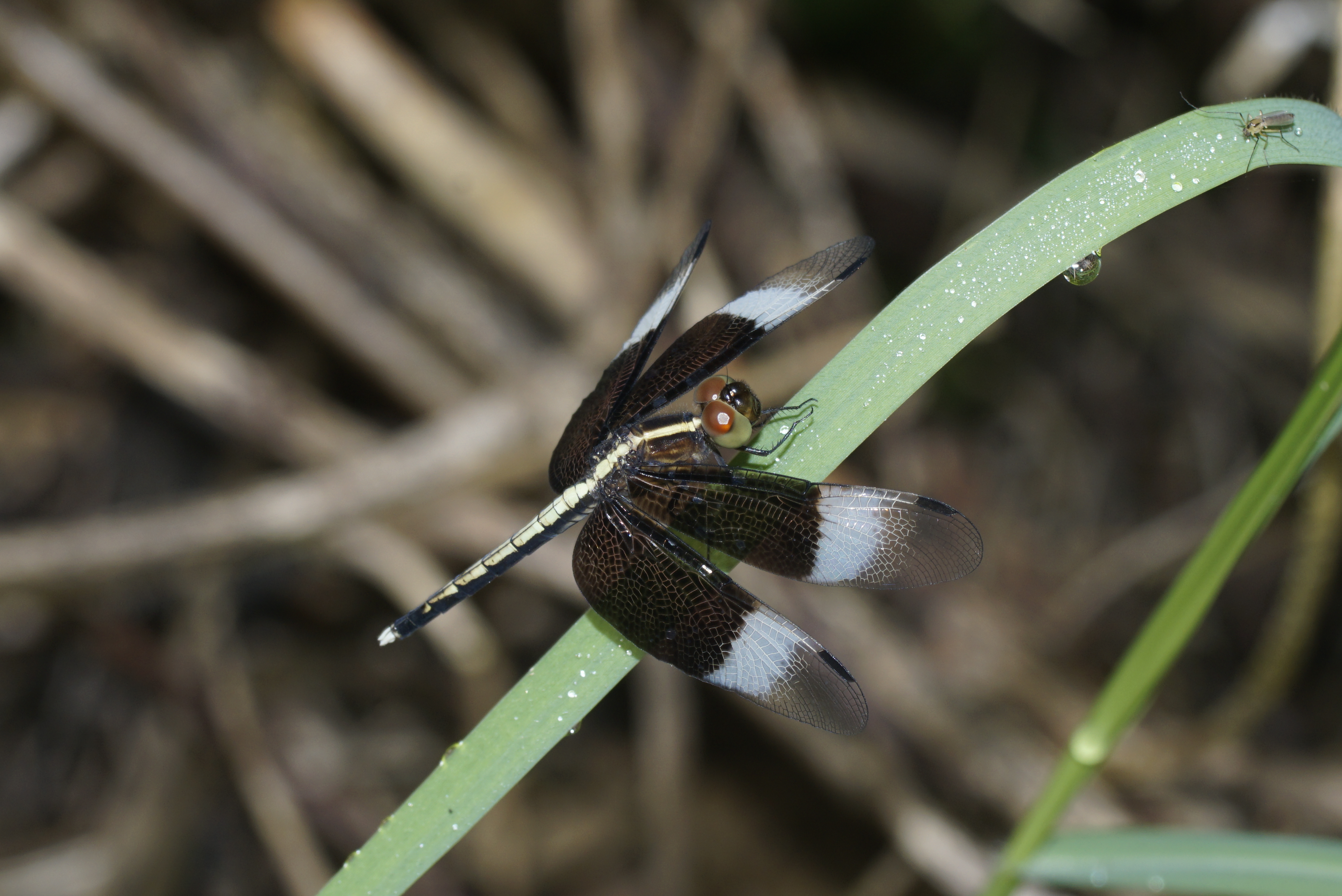
Neurothemis tullia male

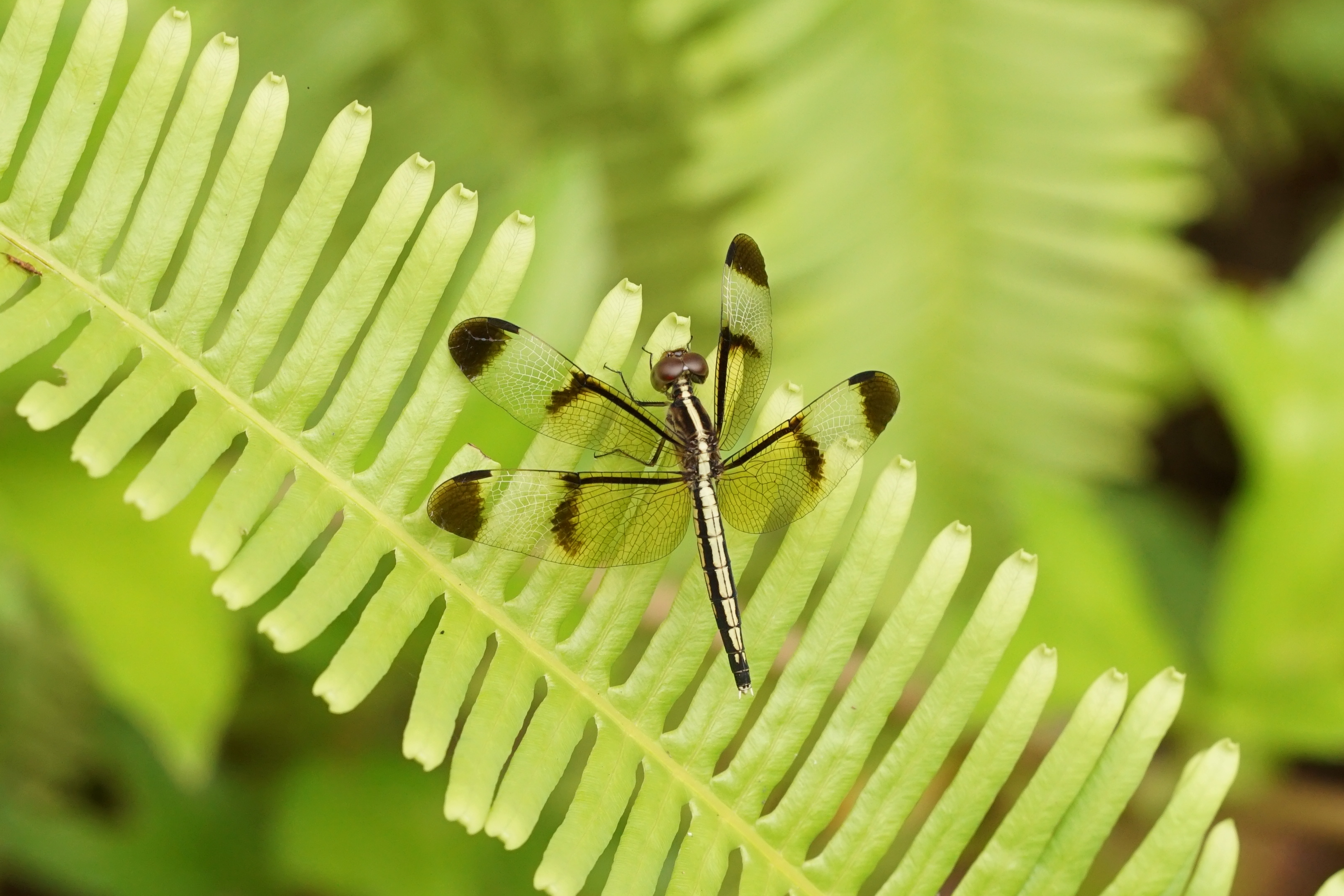
Neurothemis tullia female

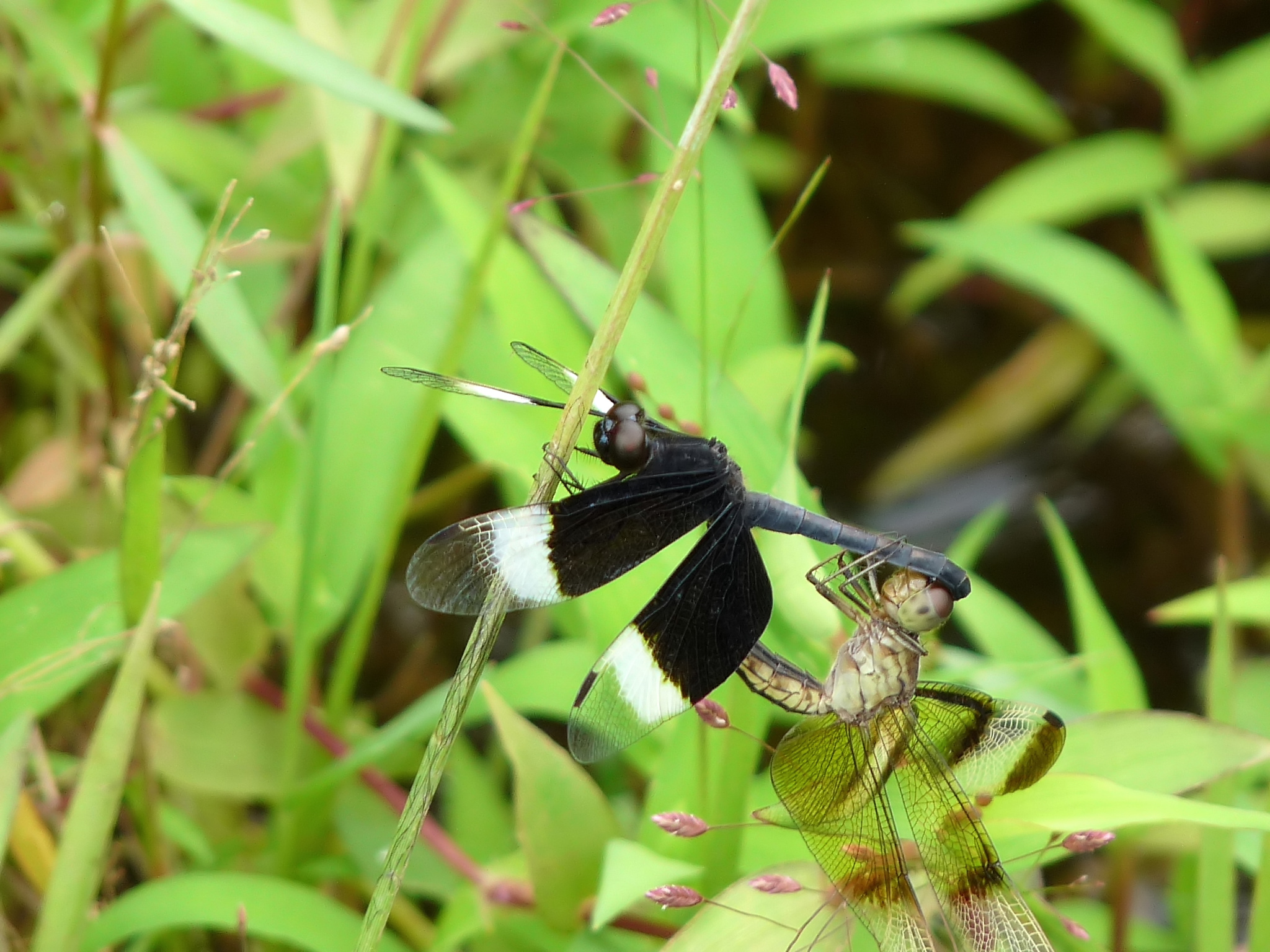
Neurothemis tullia mating pair

==== Genus: Onychothemis ====
===== Species: Onychothemis testacea =====
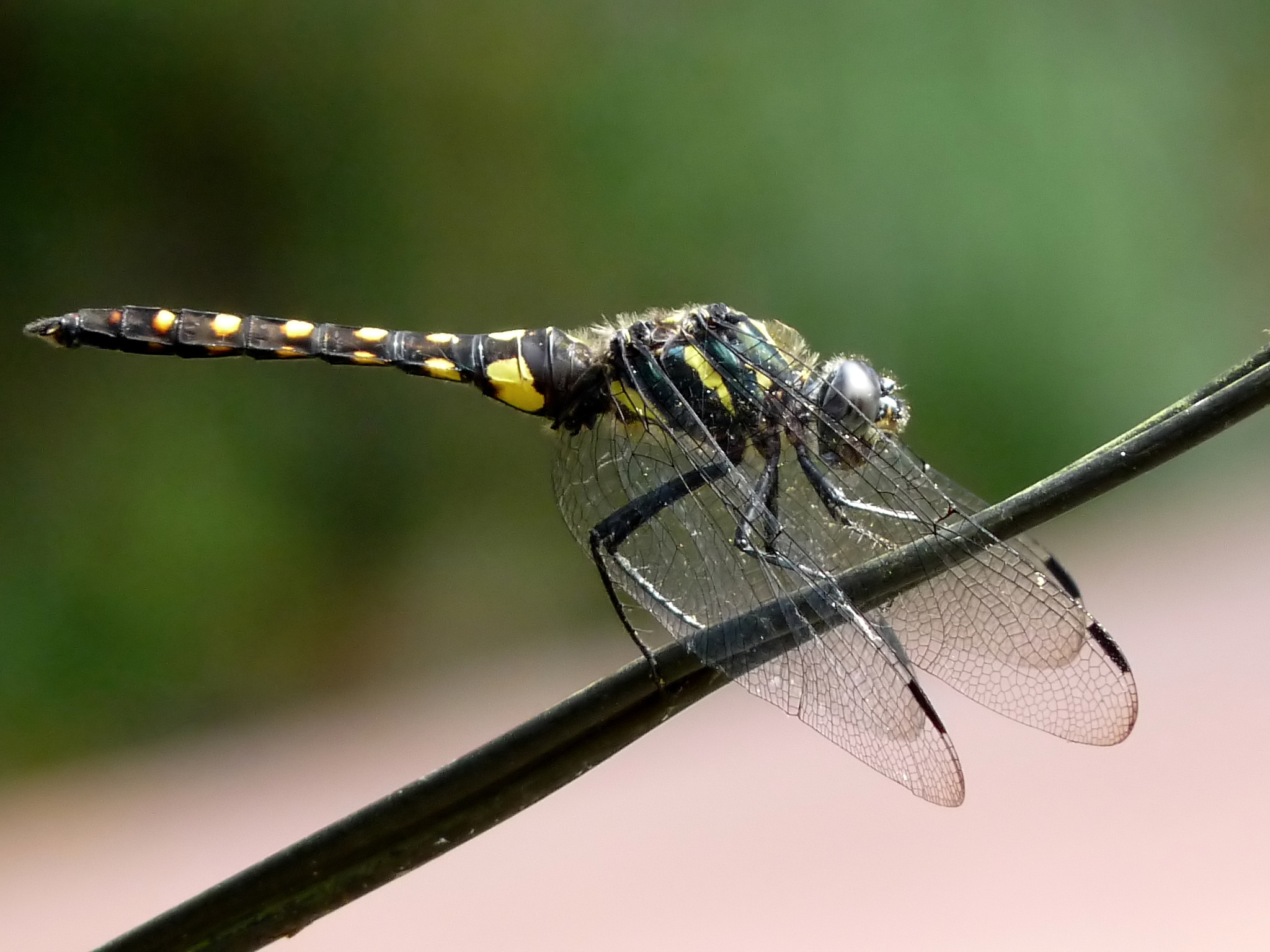
Onychothemis testacea male

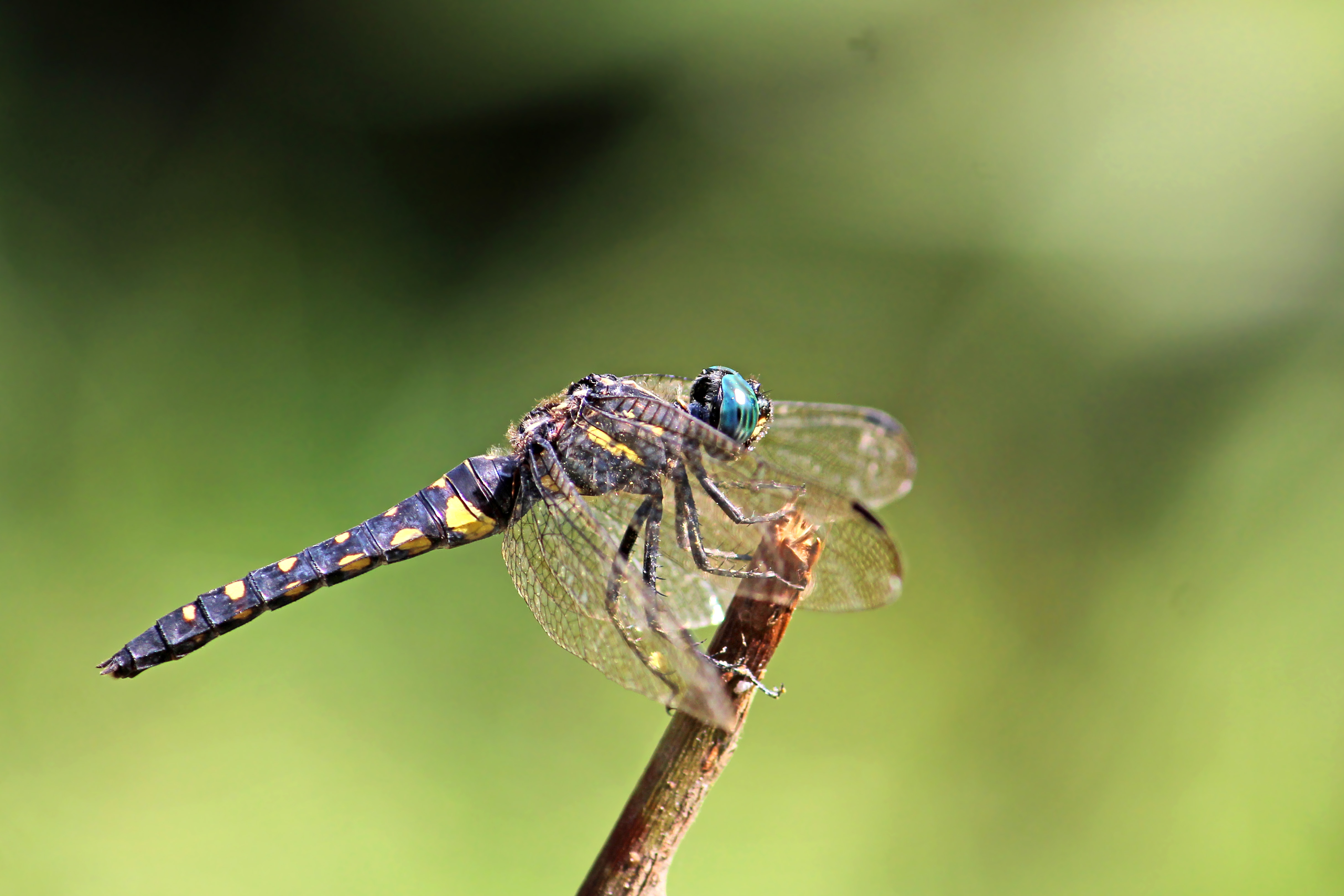
female

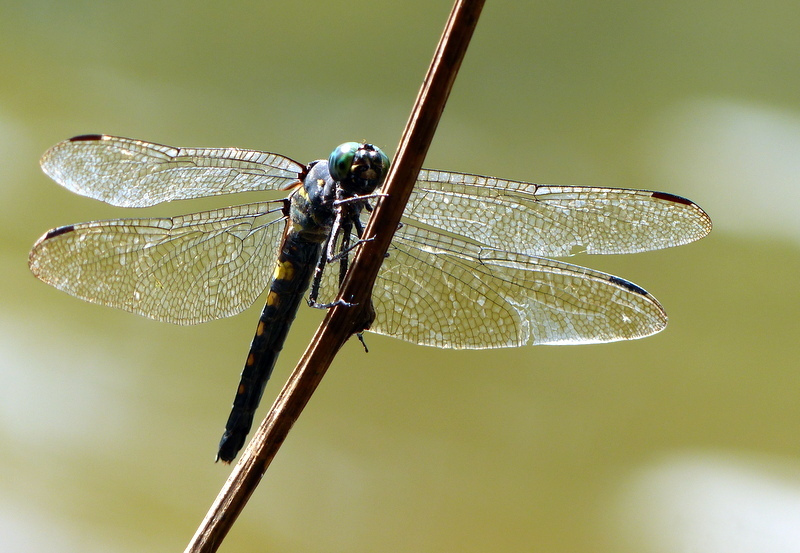
Onychothemis testacea female

==== Genus: Orthetrum ====
===== Species: Orthetrum chrysis =====
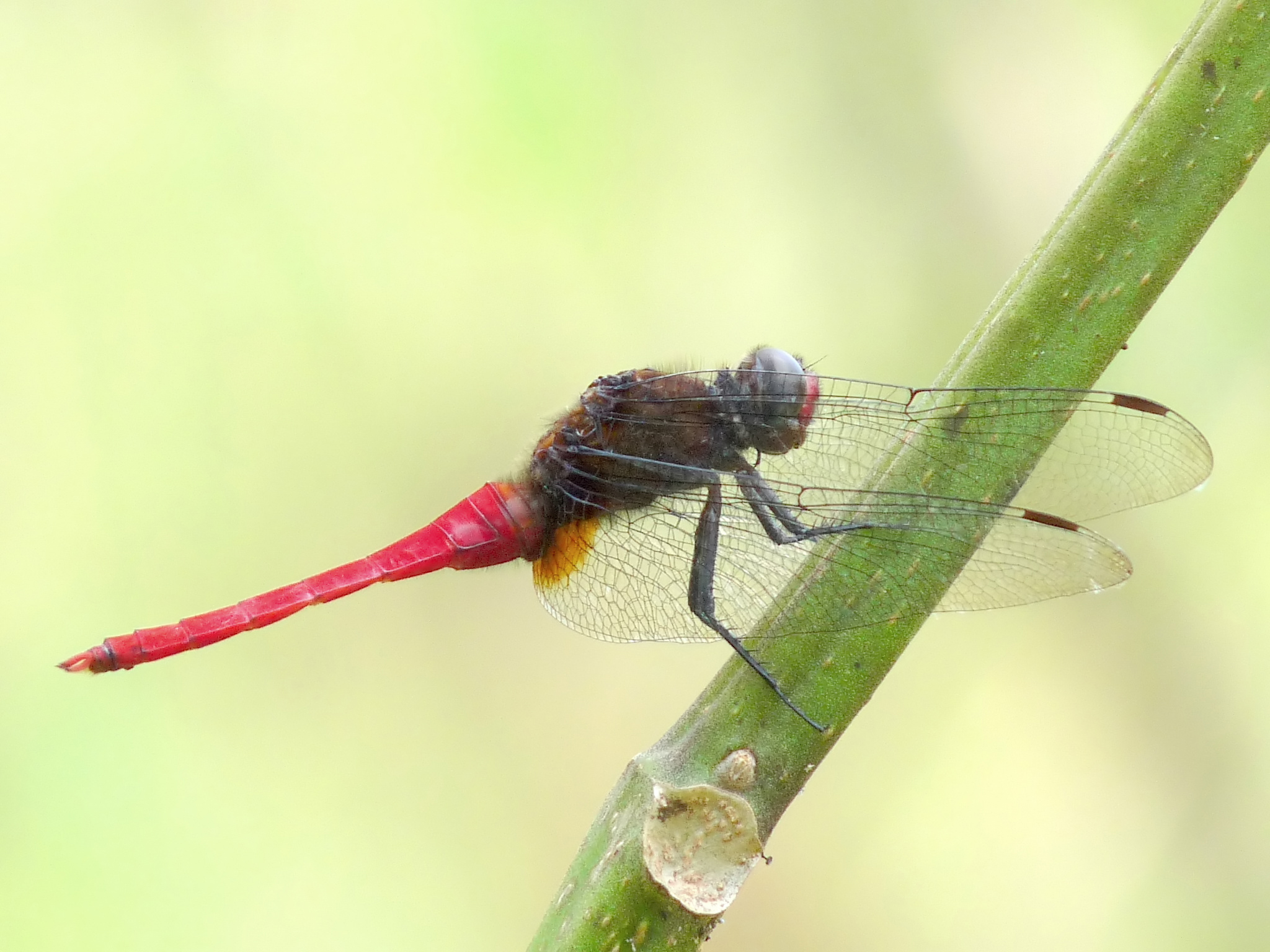
Orthetrum chrysis male

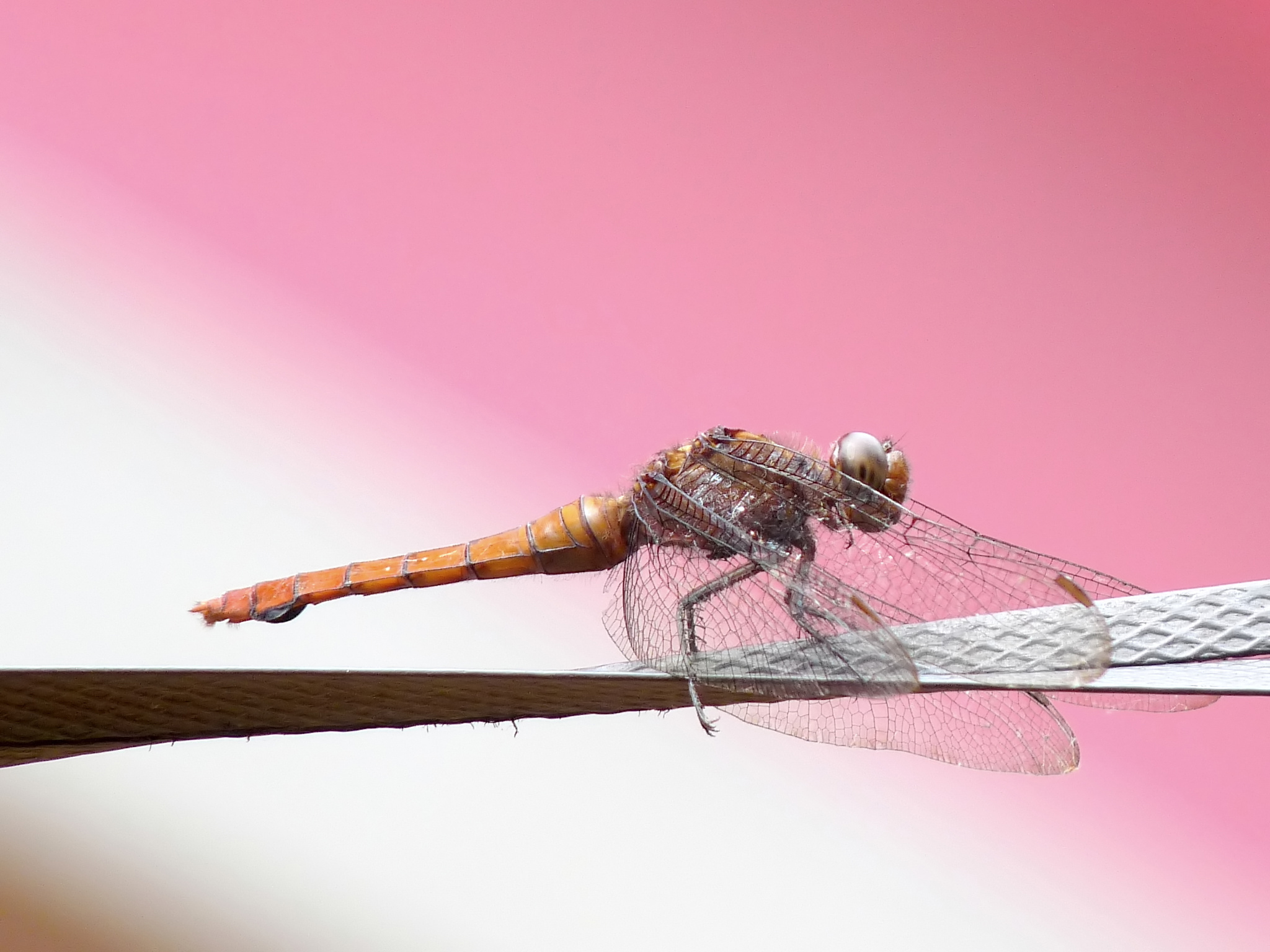
Orthetrum chrysis female

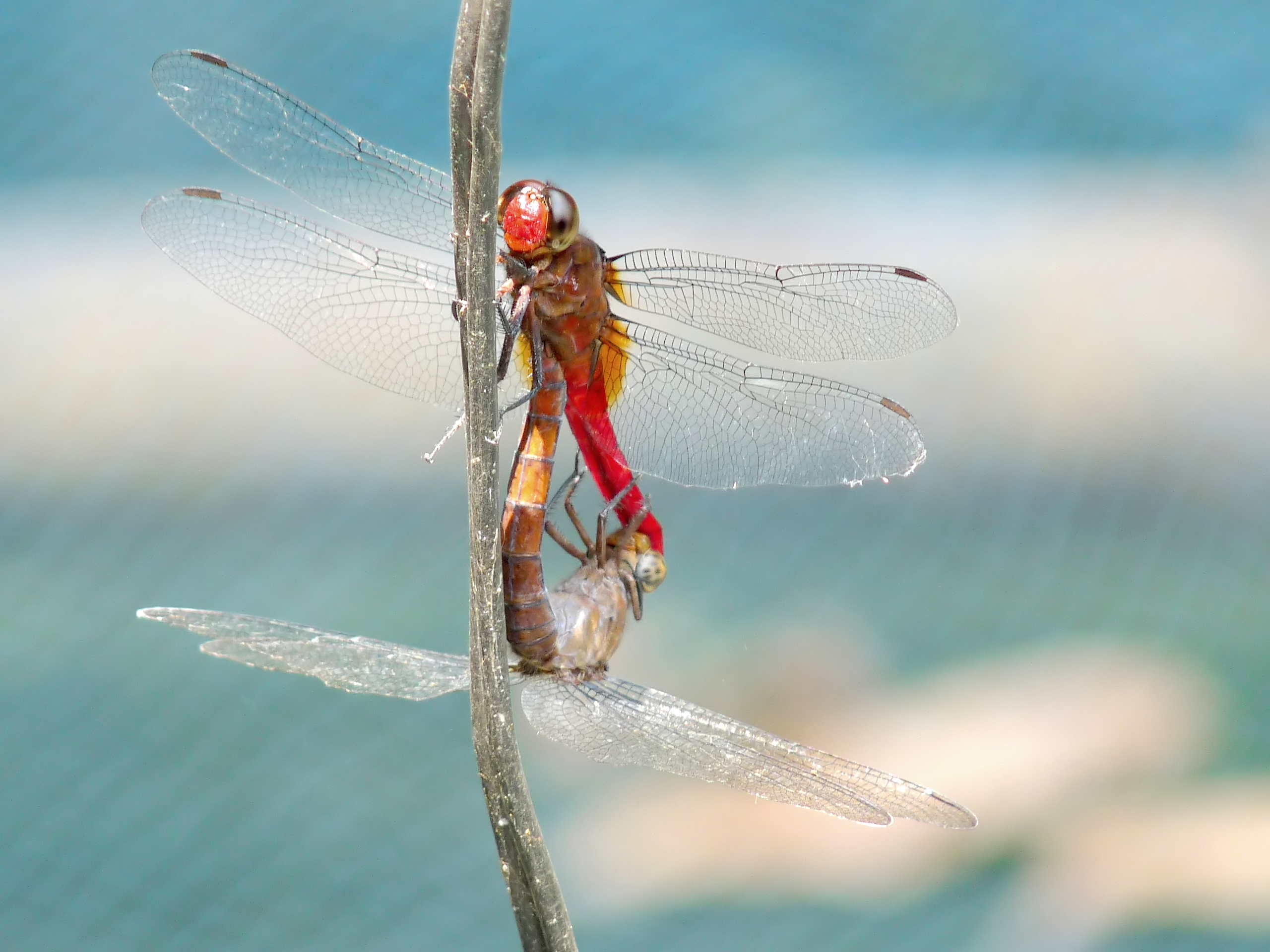
Orthetrum chrysis mating pair

===== Species: Orthetrum glaucum =====
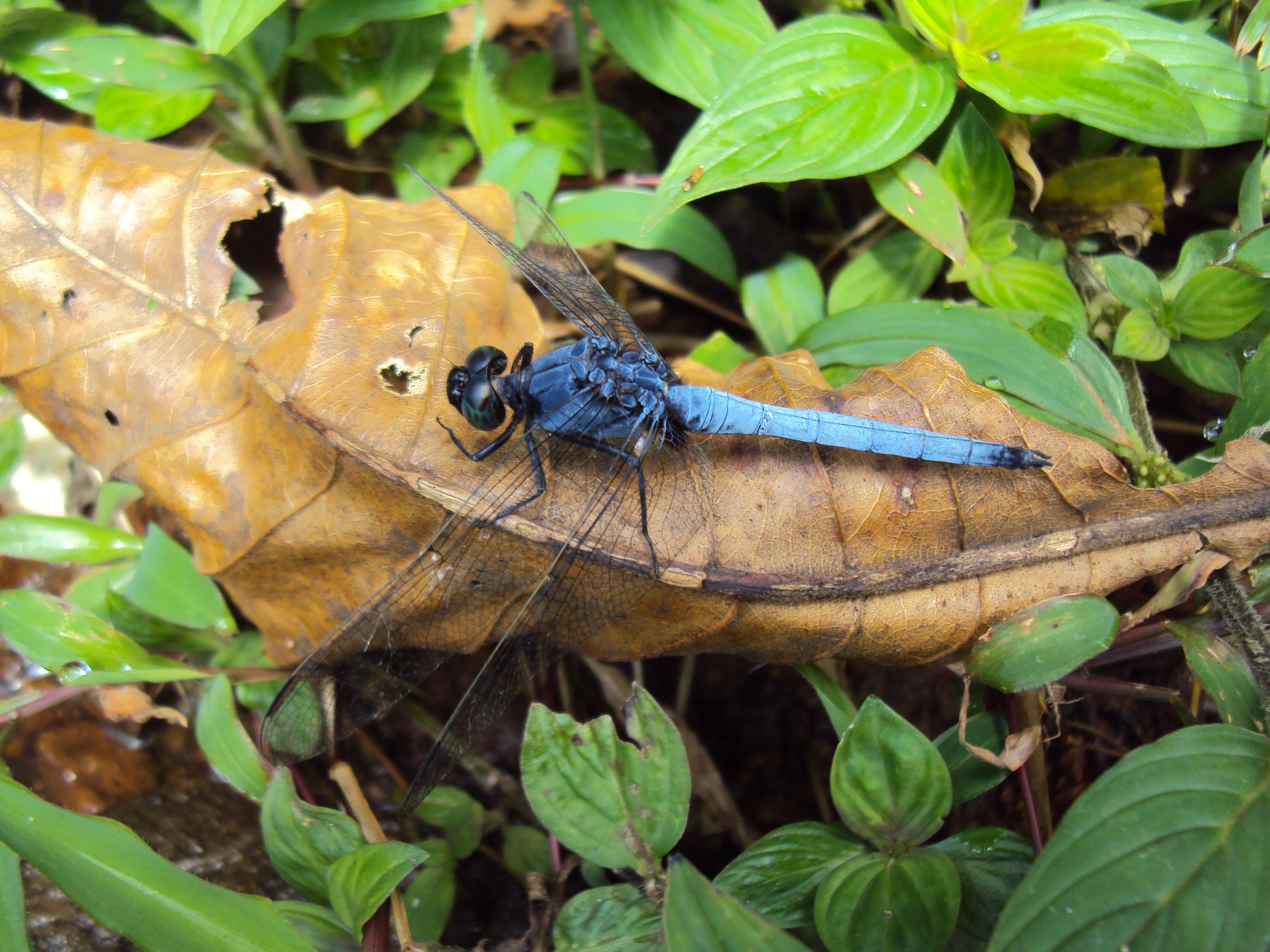
Orthetrum glaucum male

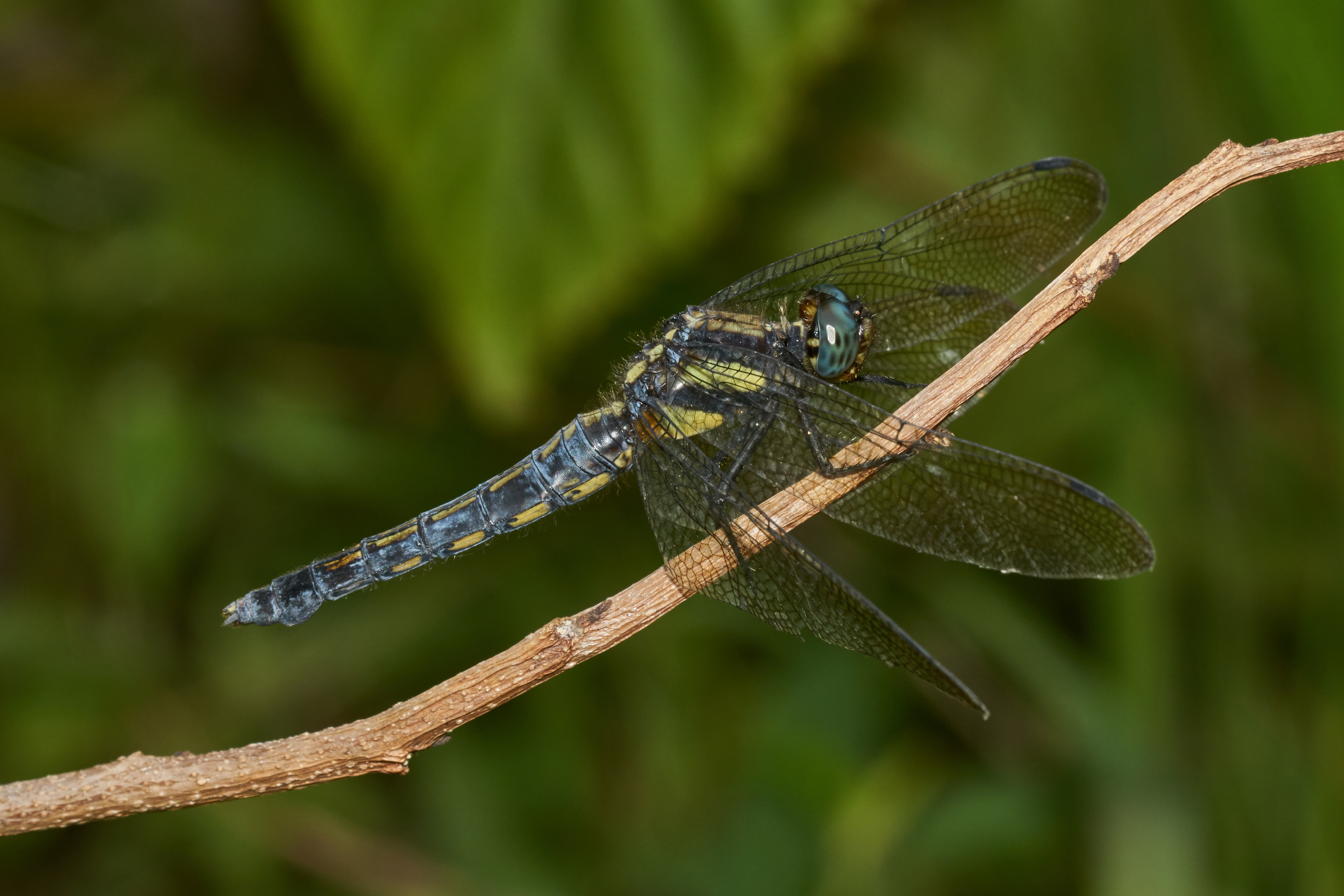
Orthetrum glaucum female

===== Species: Orthetrum luzonicum =====
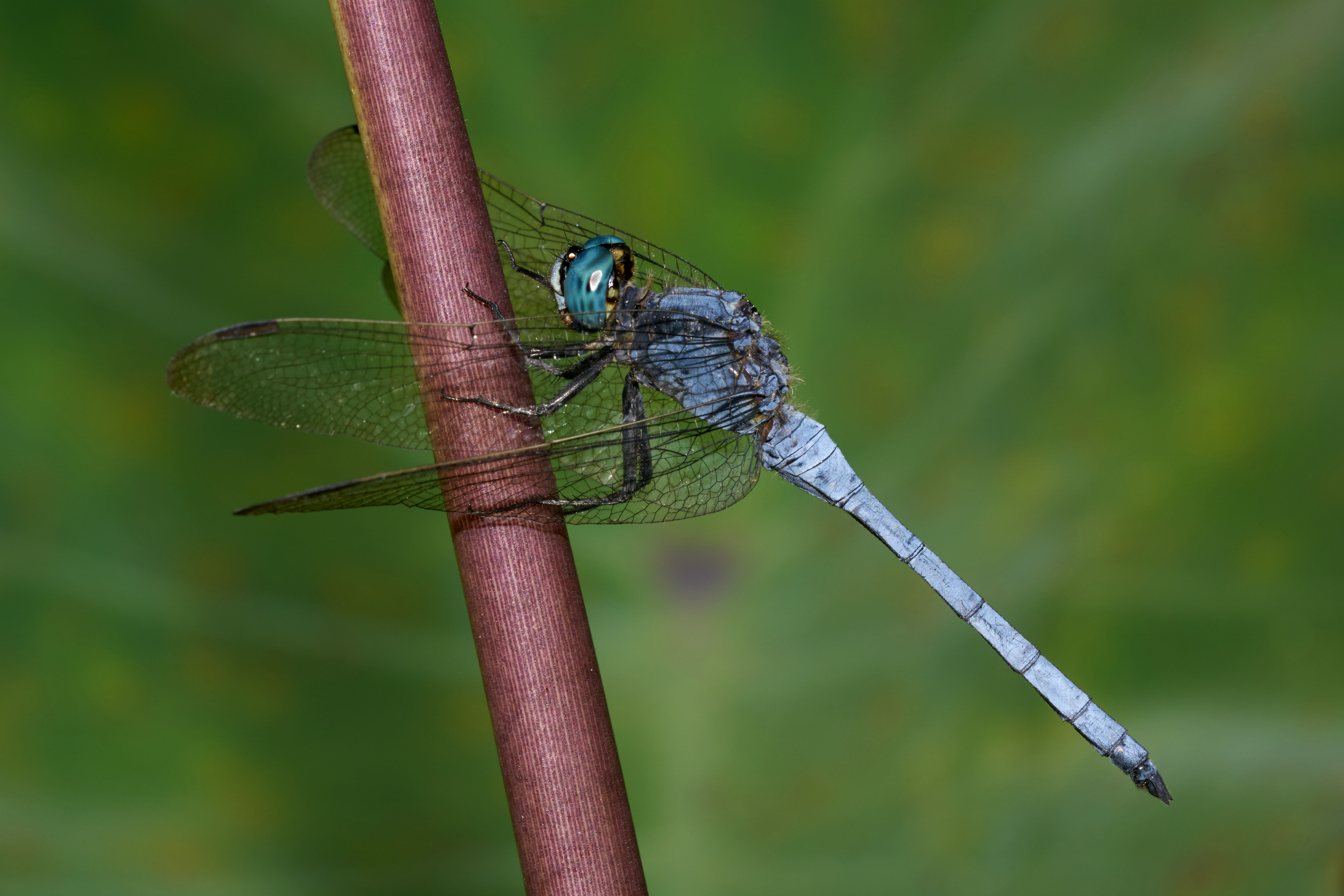
Orthetrum luzonicum male

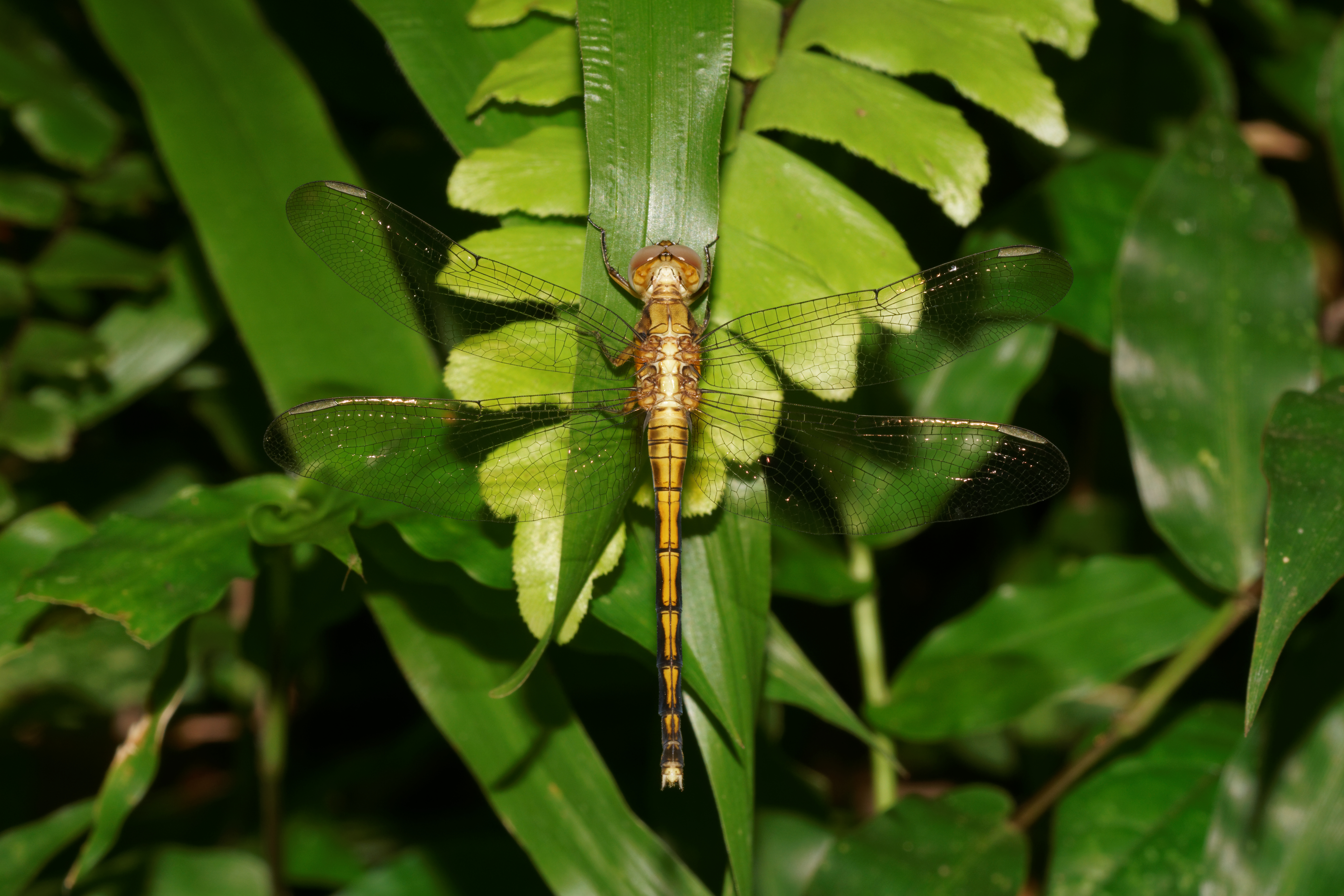
Orthetrum luzonicum female

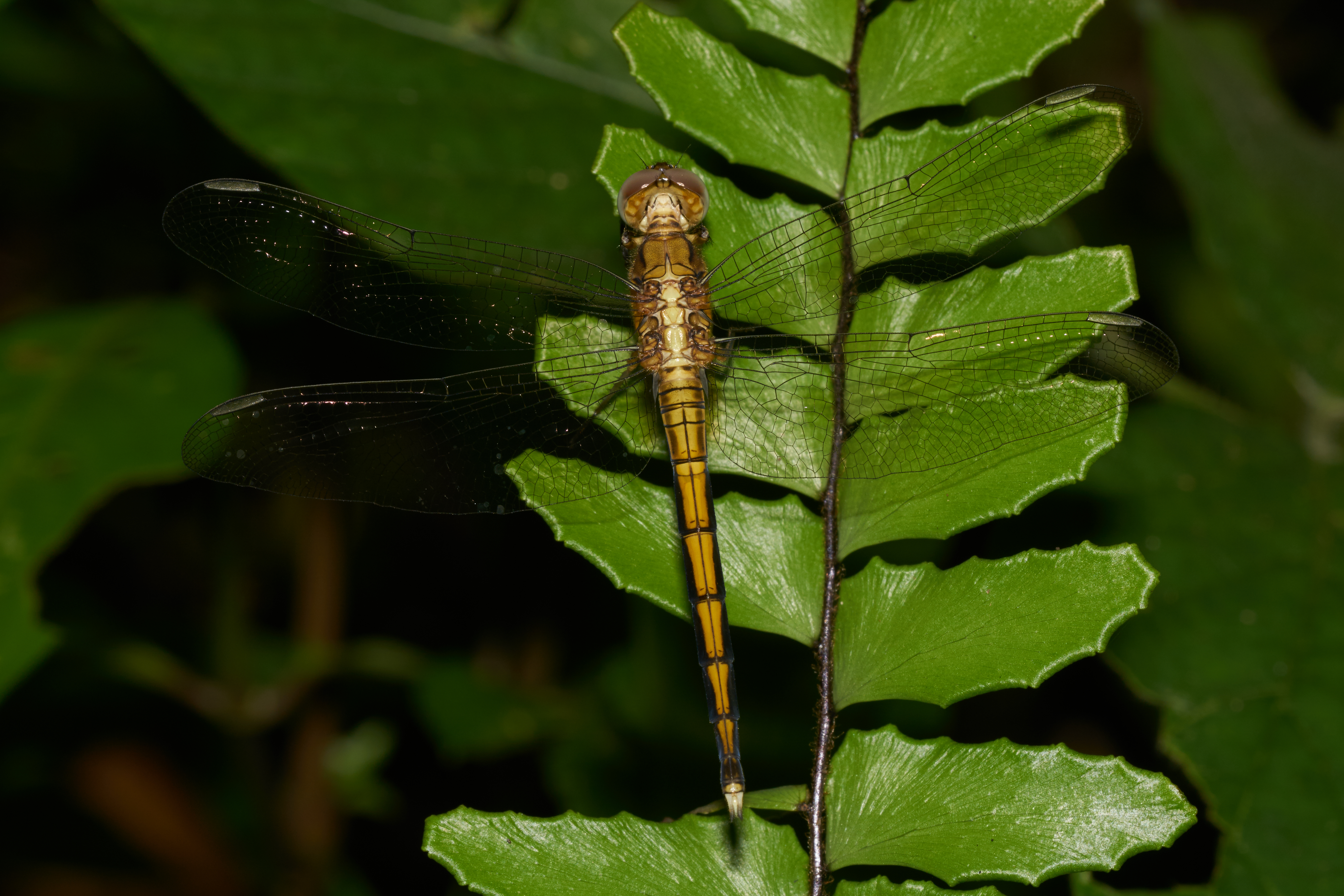
Orthetrum luzonicum juvenile male

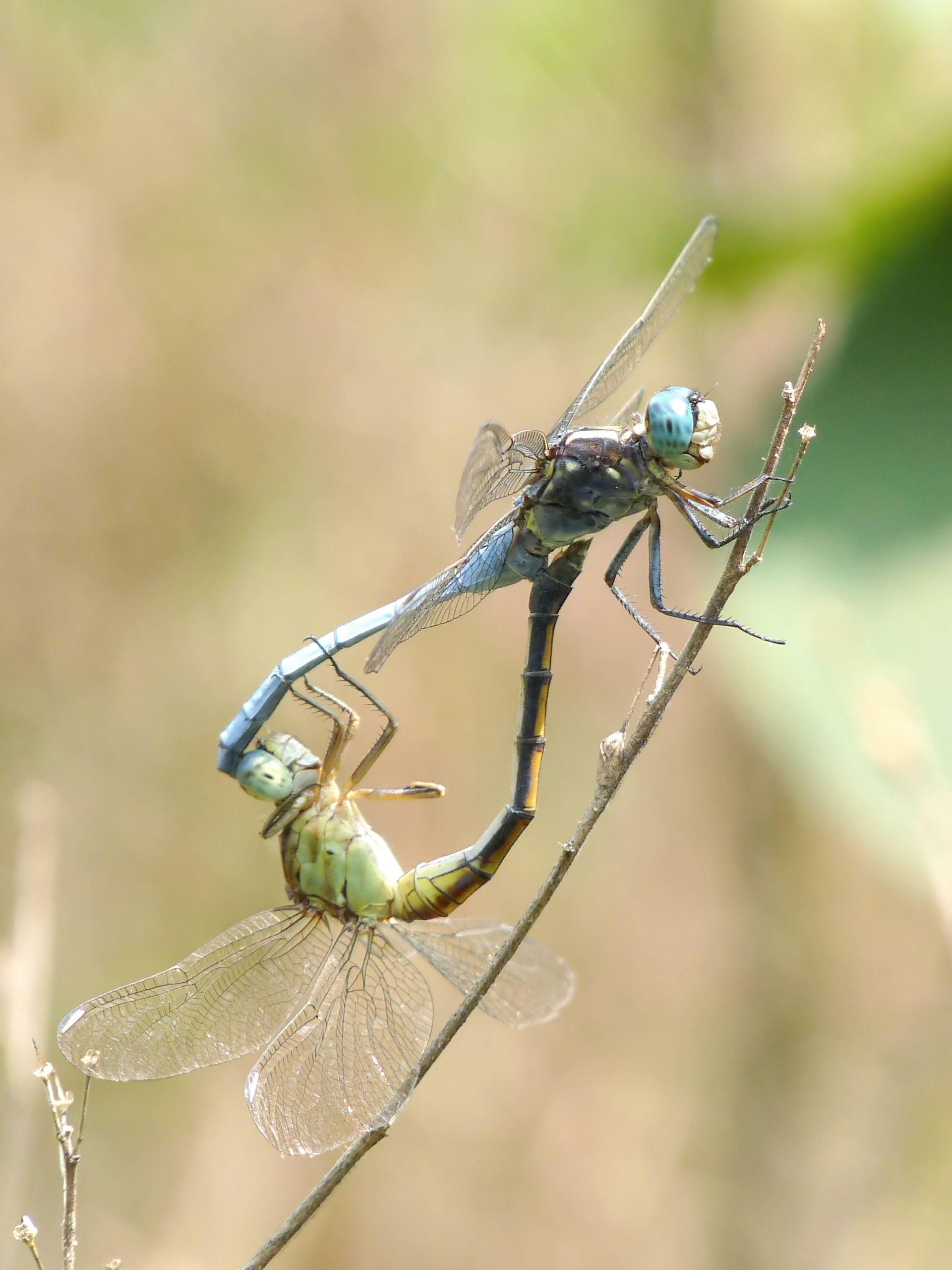
Orthetrum luzonicum mating pair

===== Species: Orthetrum pruinosum =====
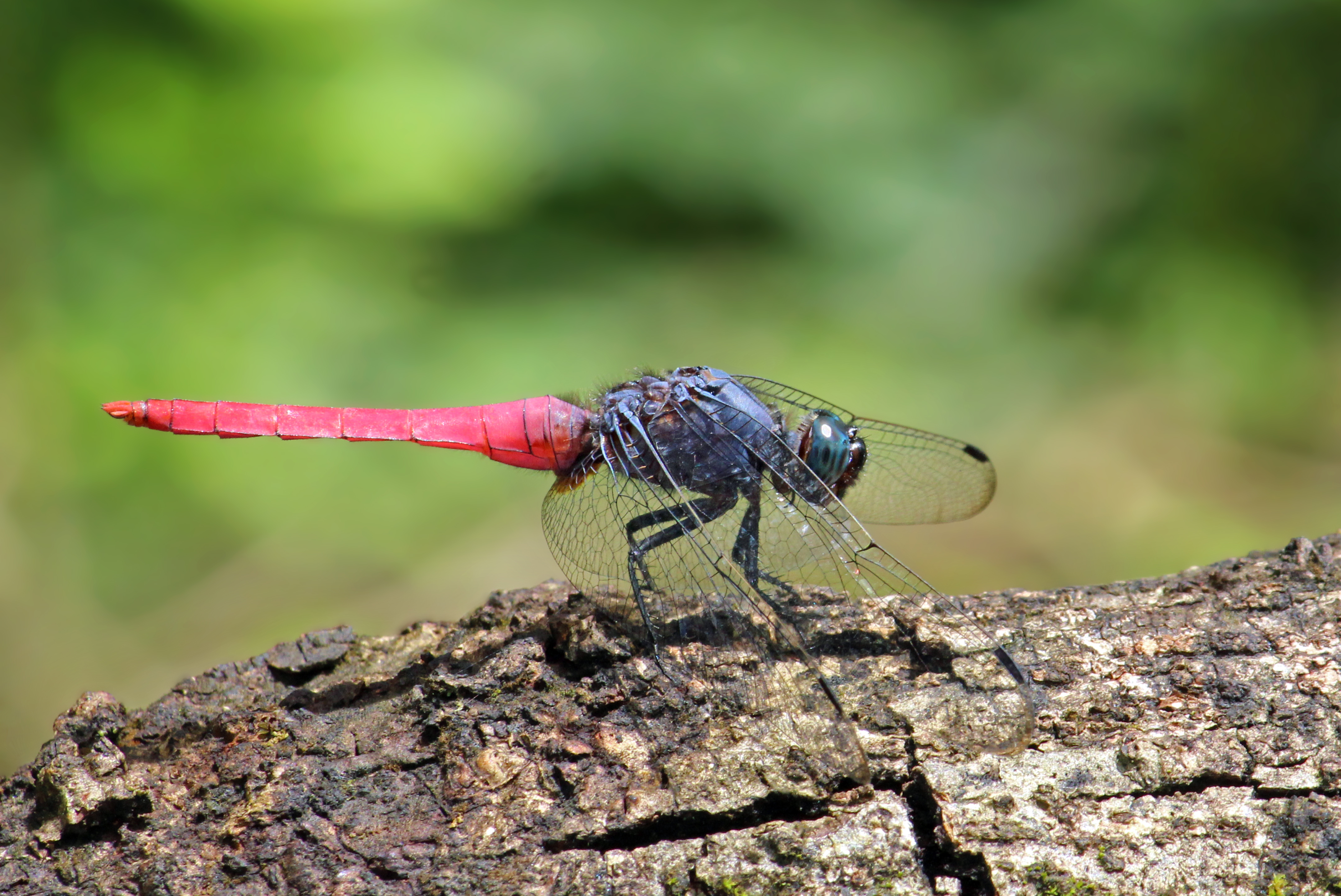
Orthetrum pruinosum male

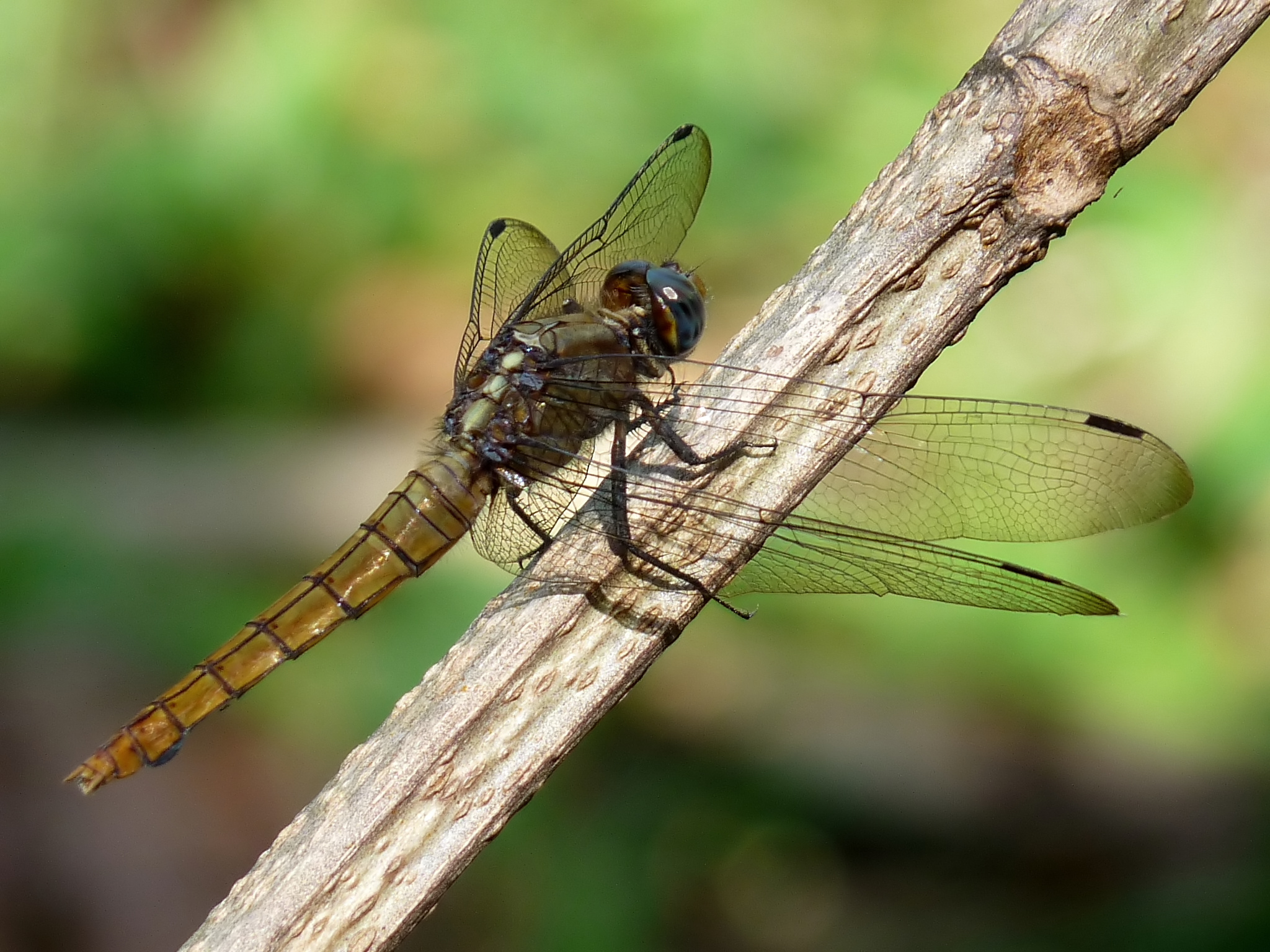
Orthetrum pruinosum female

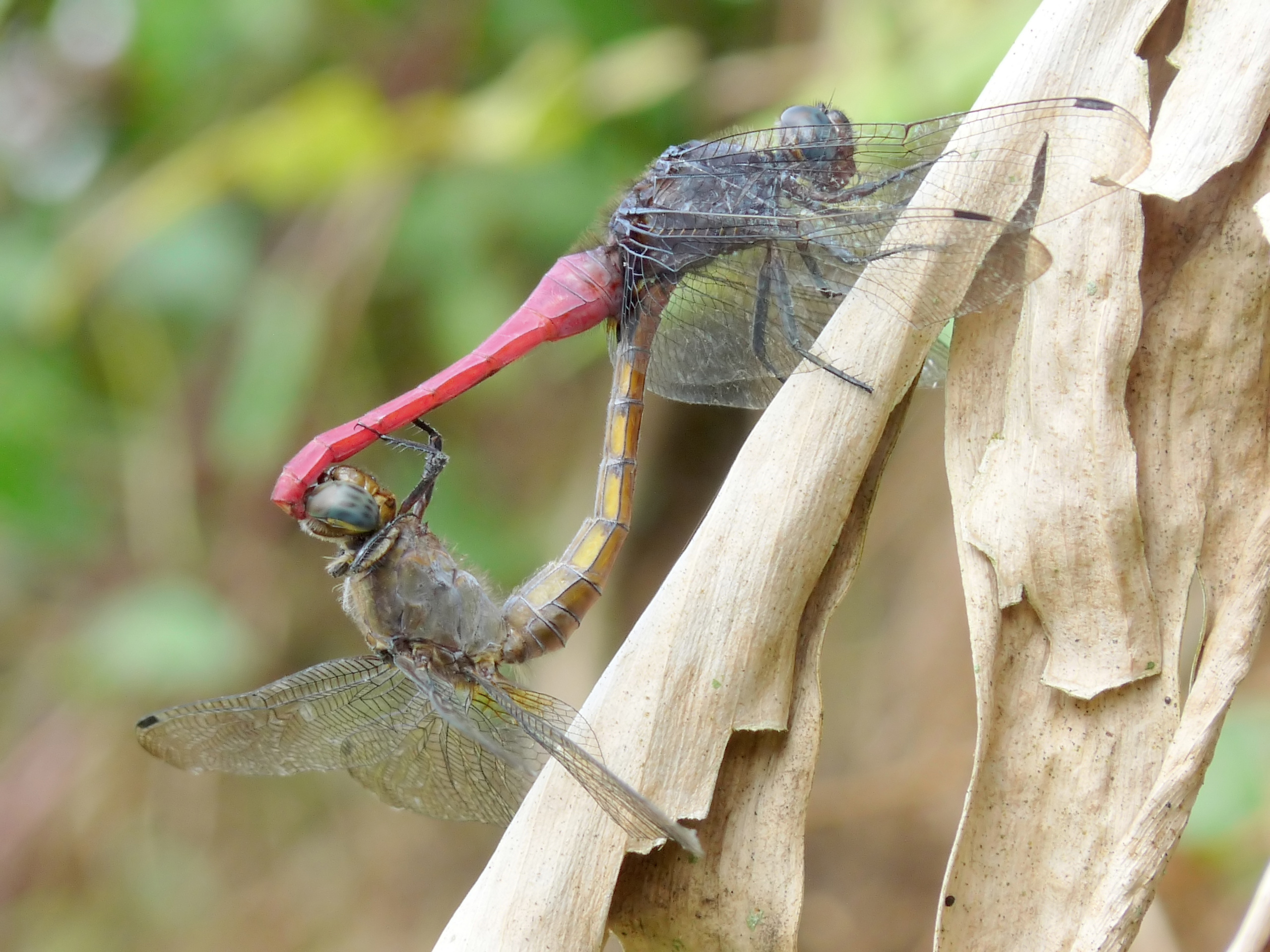
Orthetrum pruinosum mating pair

===== Species: Orthetrum sabina =====
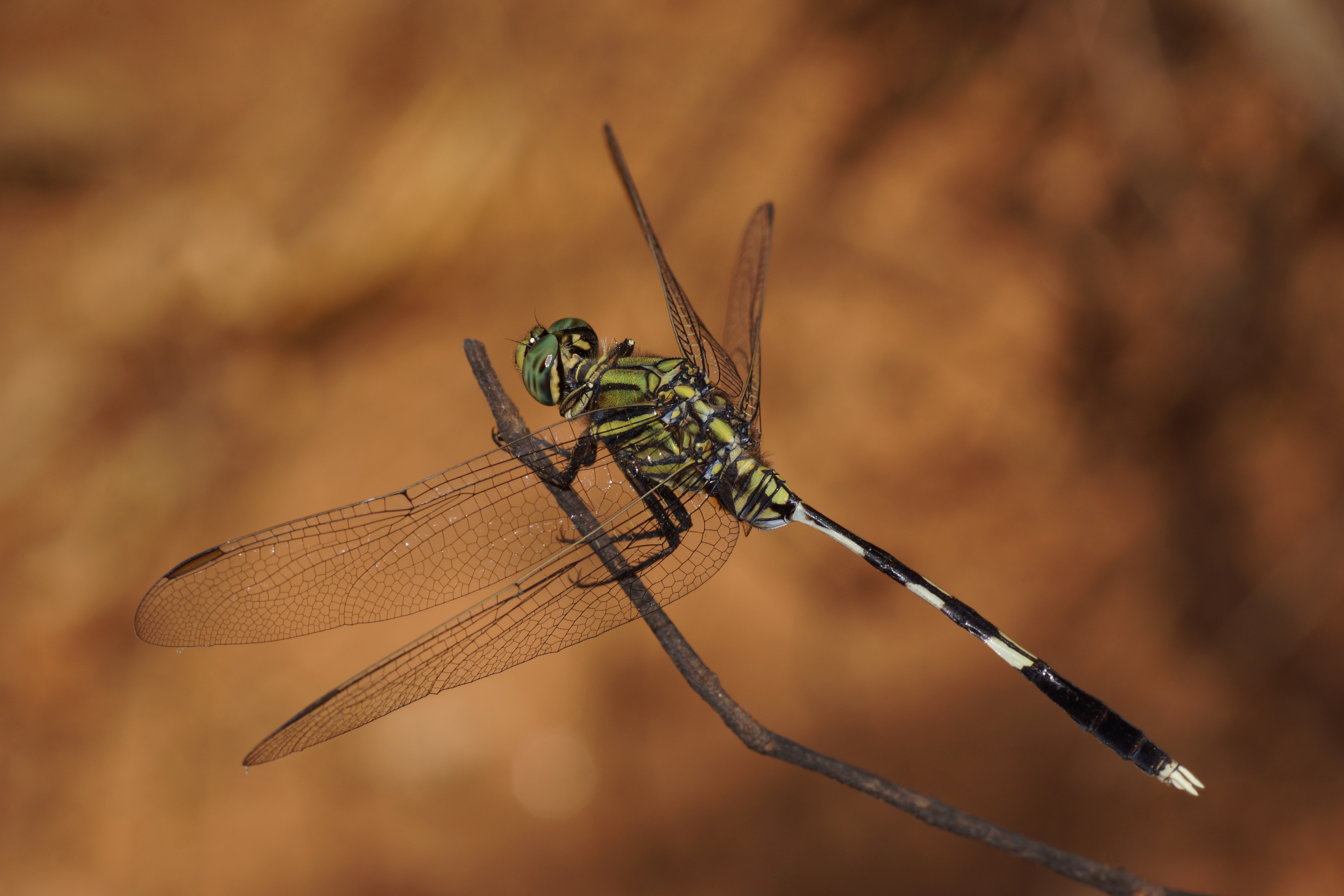
Orthetrum sabina male

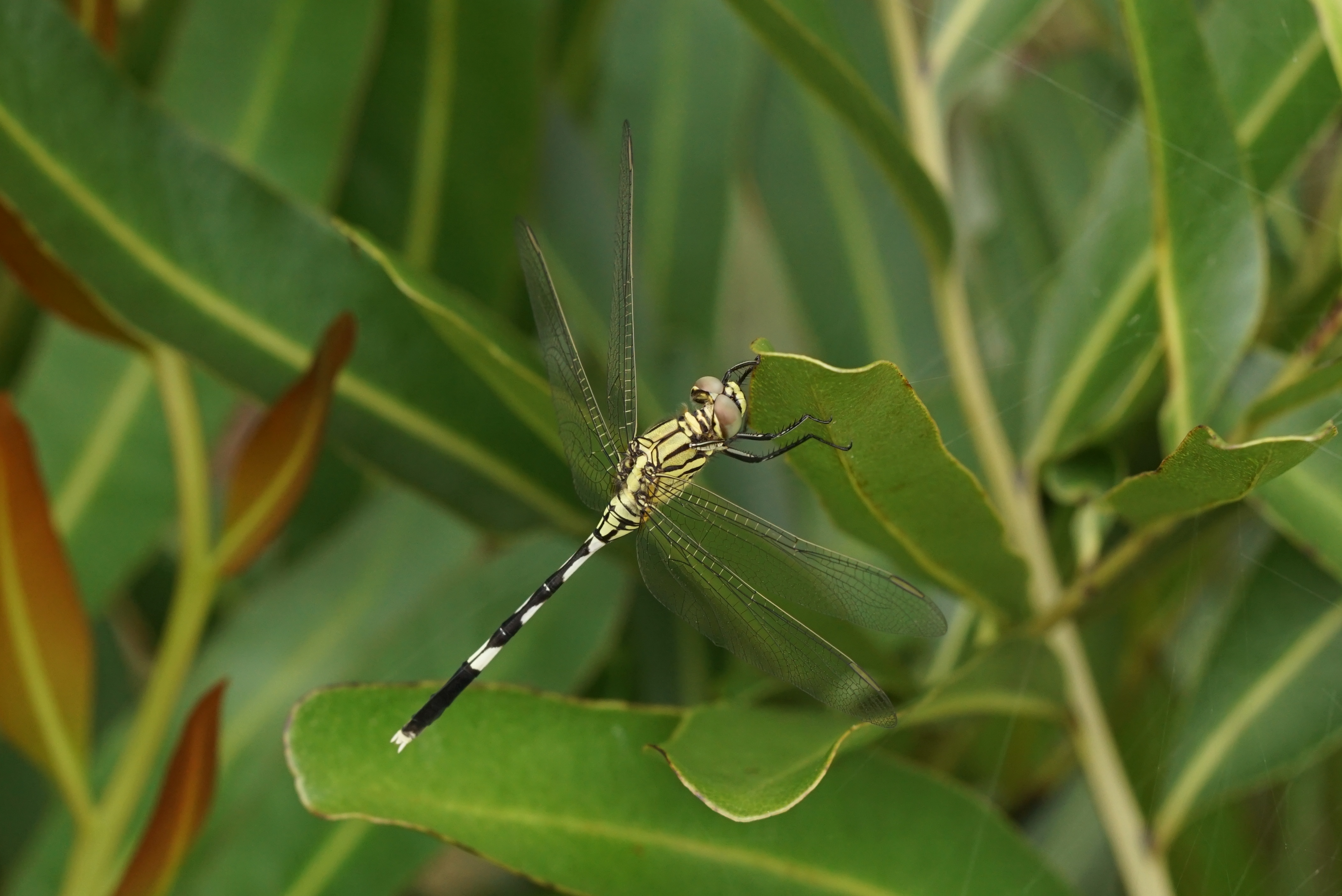
Orthetrum sabina female

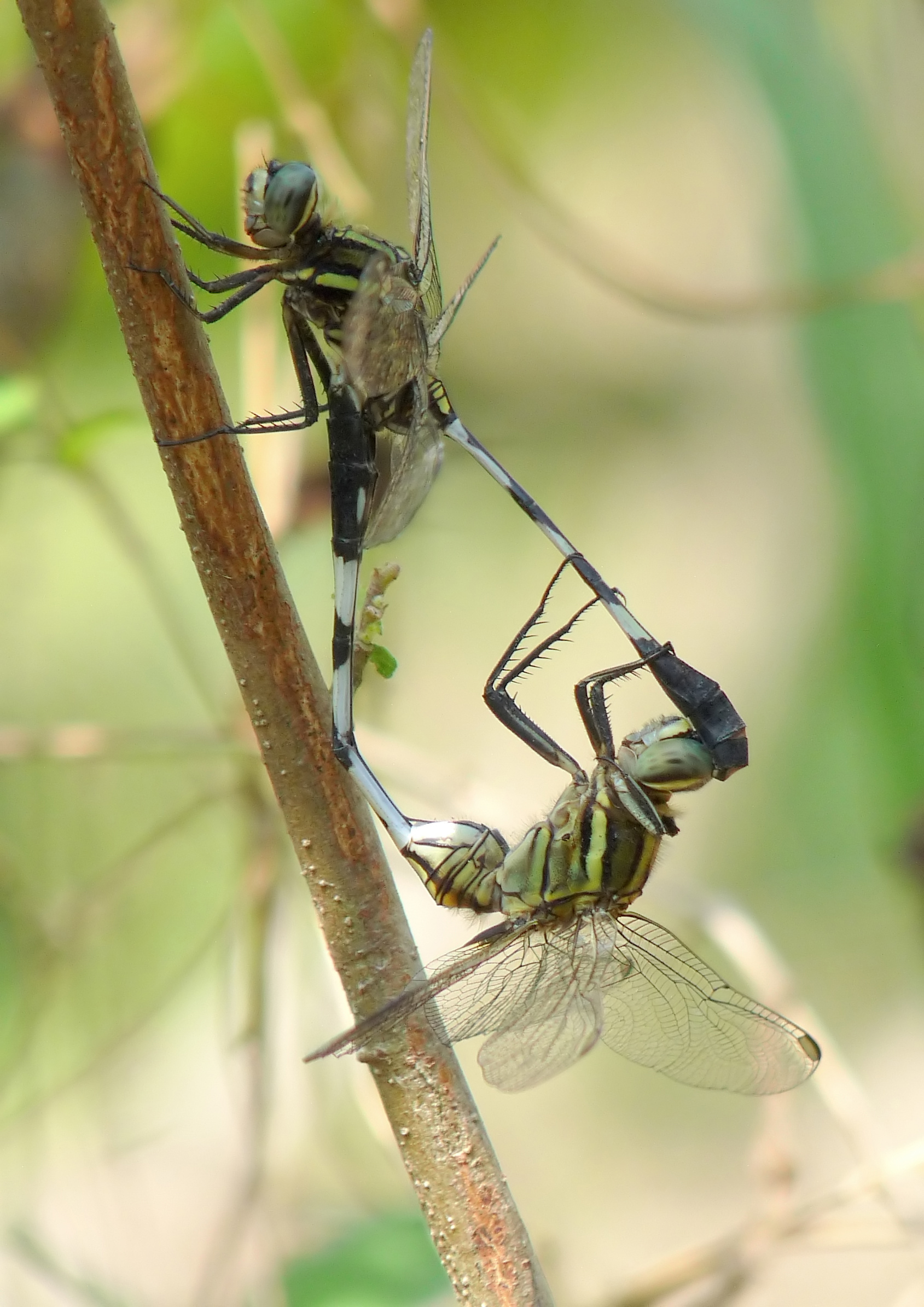
Orthetrum sabina mating pair

===== Species: Orthetrum taeniolatum =====
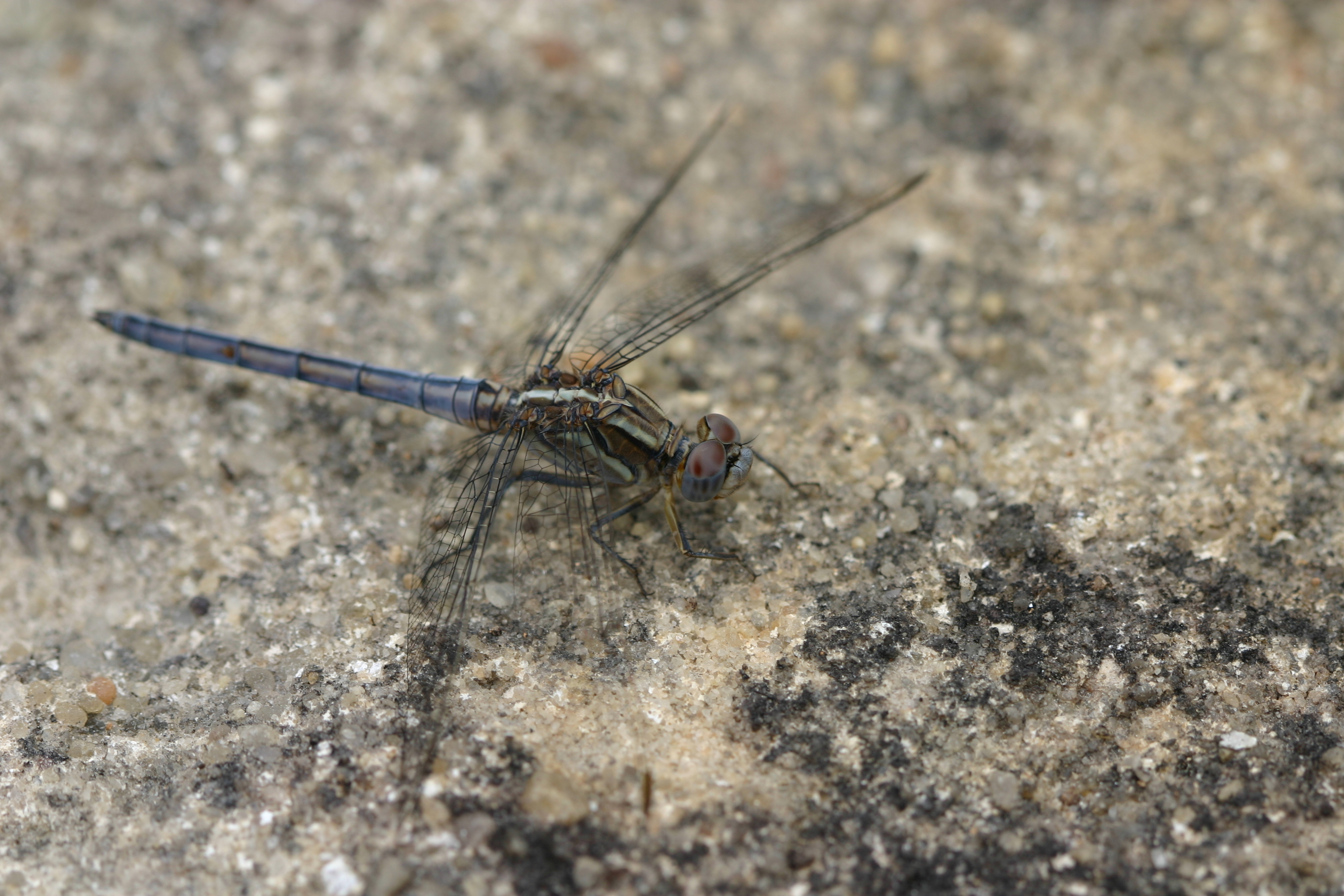
Orthetrum taeniolatum male

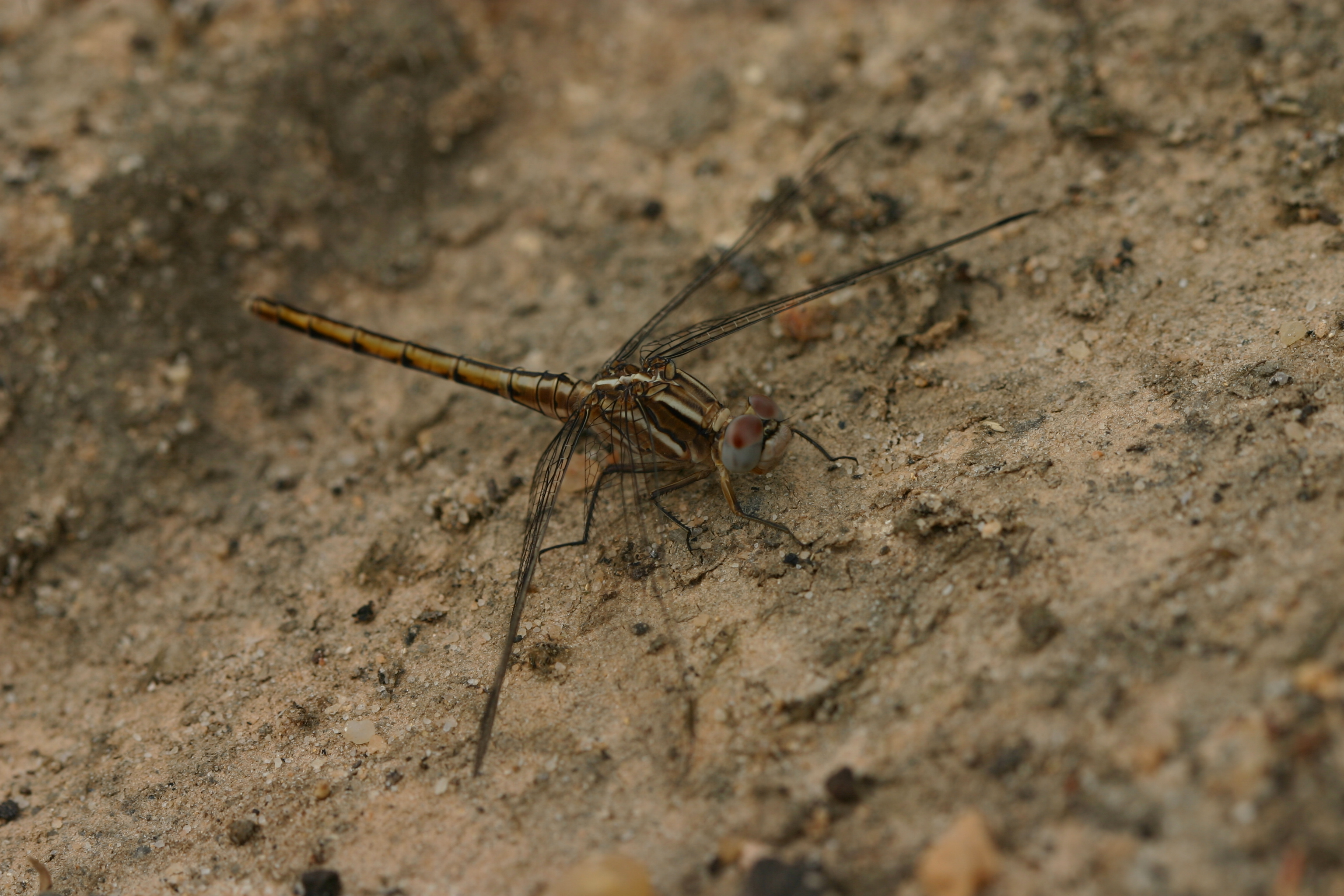
Orthetrum taeniolatum female

===== Species: Orthetrum triangulare =====
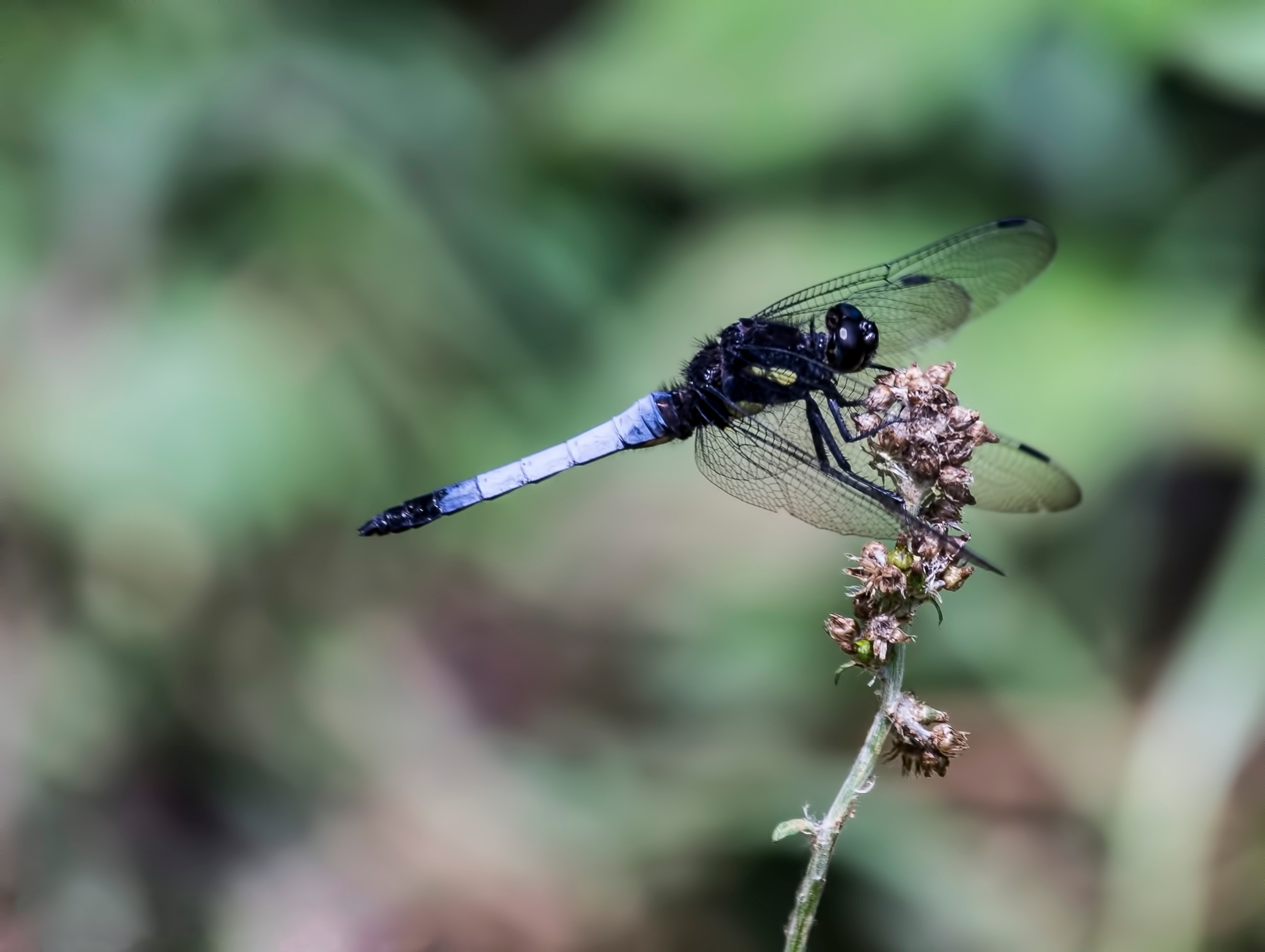
Orthetrum triangulare male

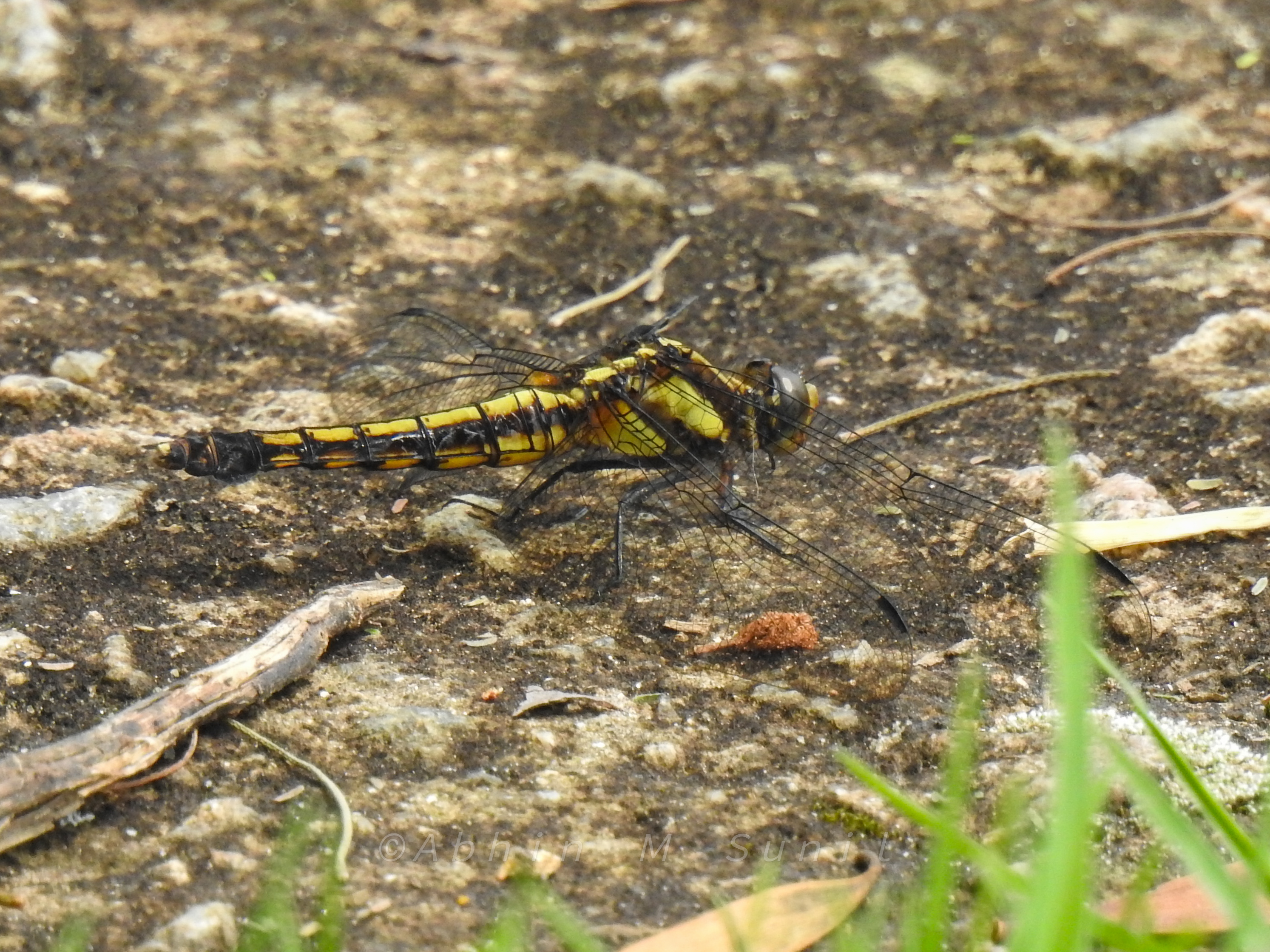
Orthetrum triangulare female

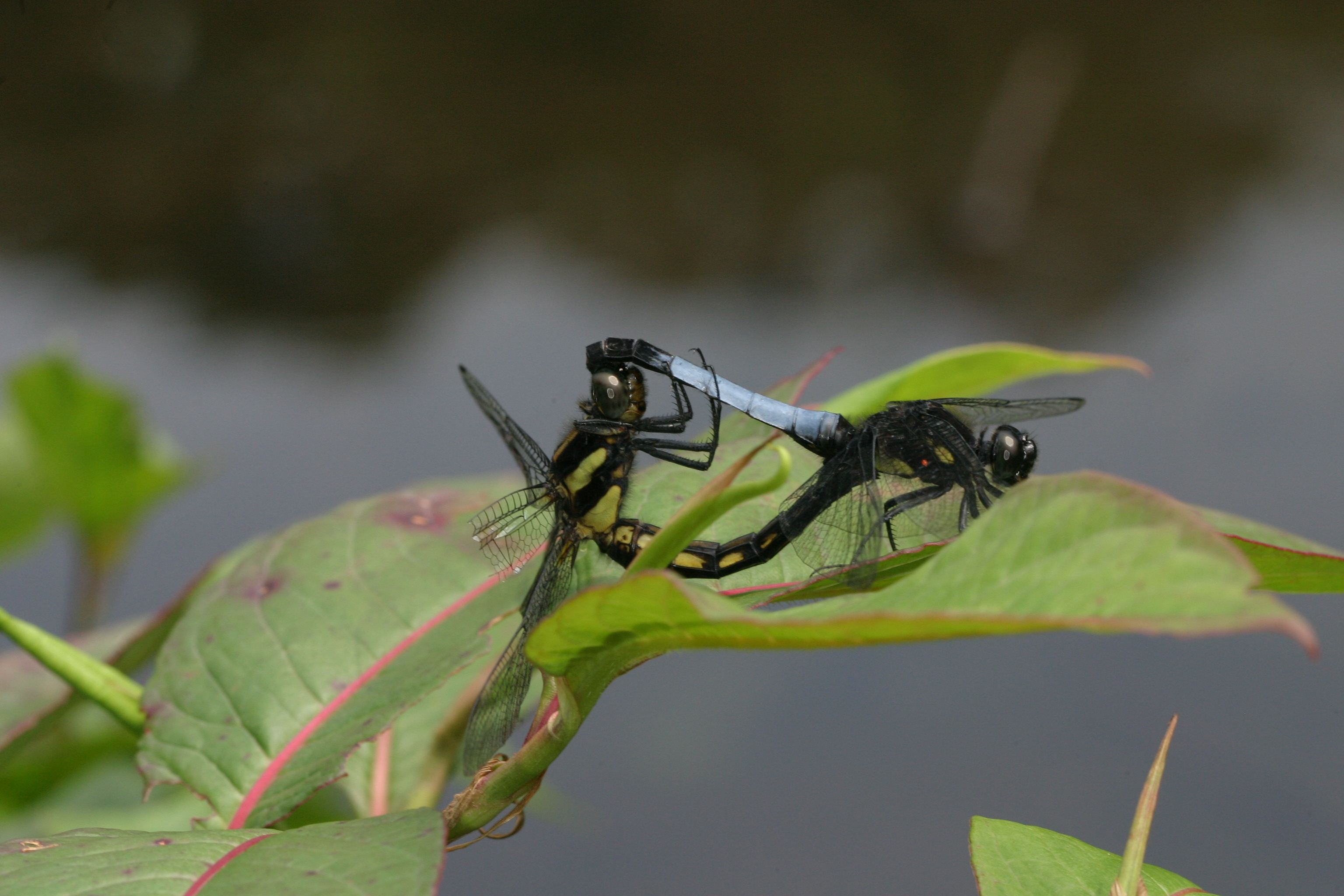
Orthetrum triangulare mating pair

==== Genus: Palpopleura ====
===== Species: Palpopleura sexmaculata =====
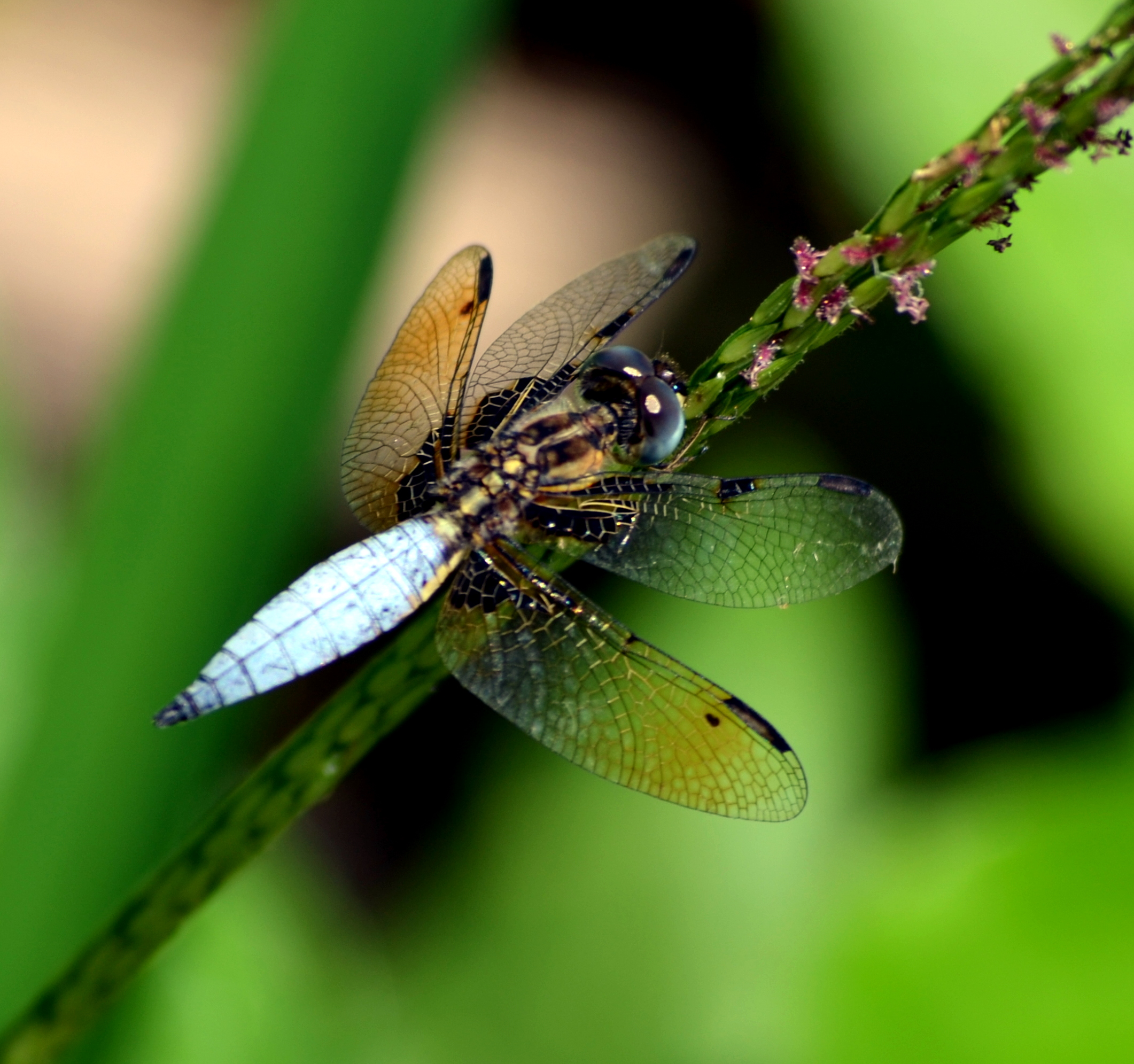
Palpopleura sexmaculata male

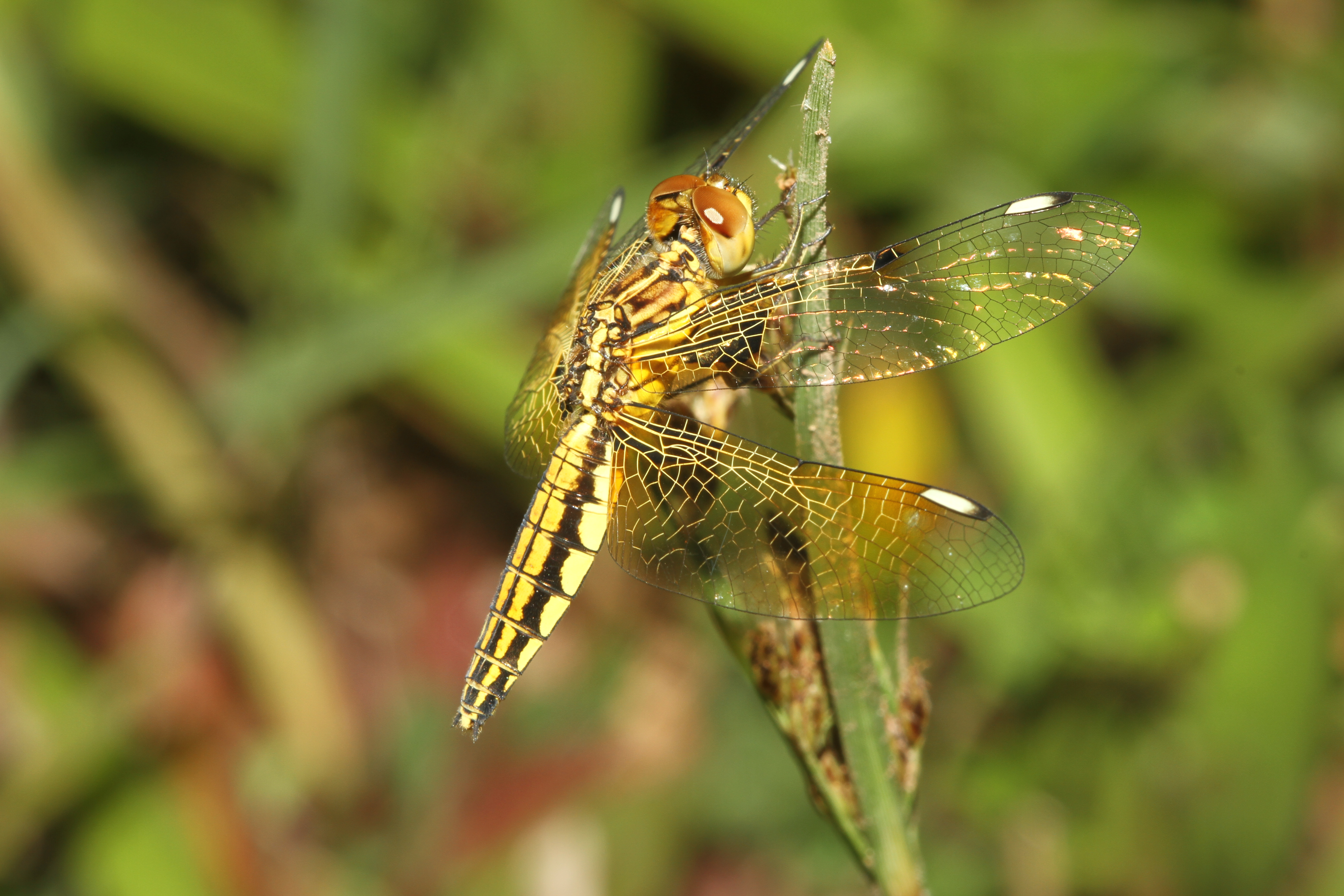
Palpopleura sexmaculata female

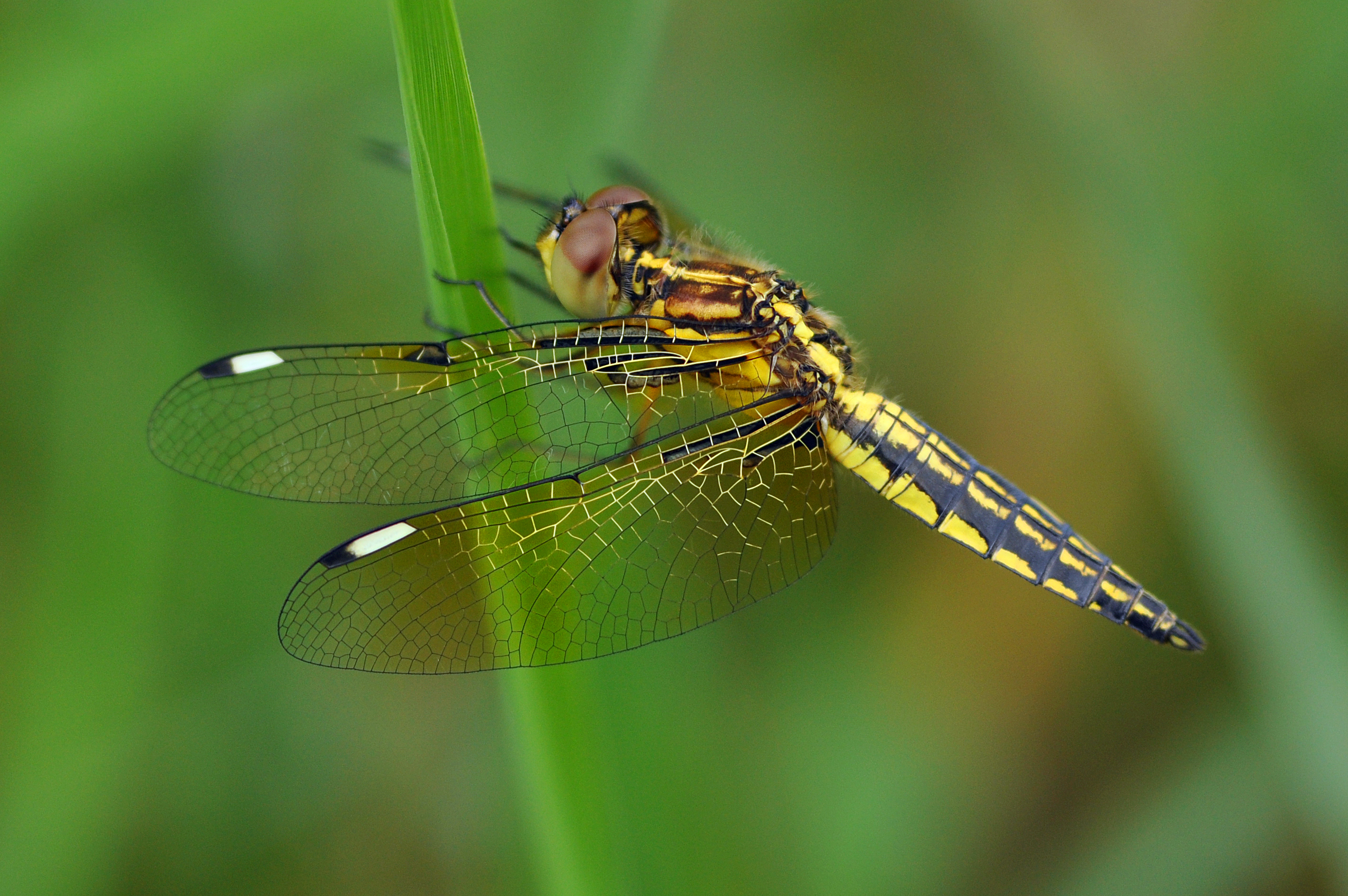
Palpopleura sexmaculata juvenile male

==== Genus: Pantala ====
===== Species: Pantala flavescens =====
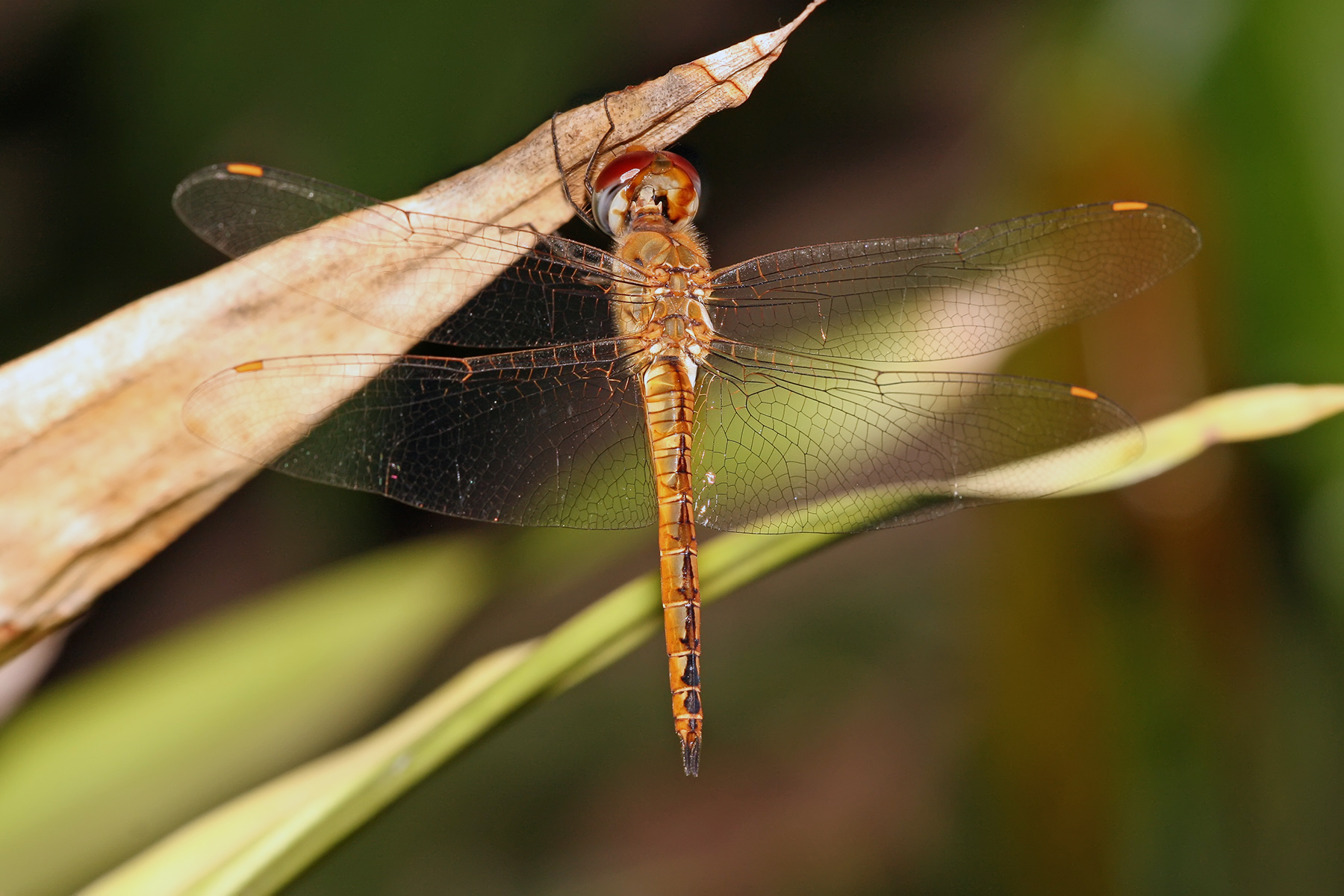
Pantala flavescens male

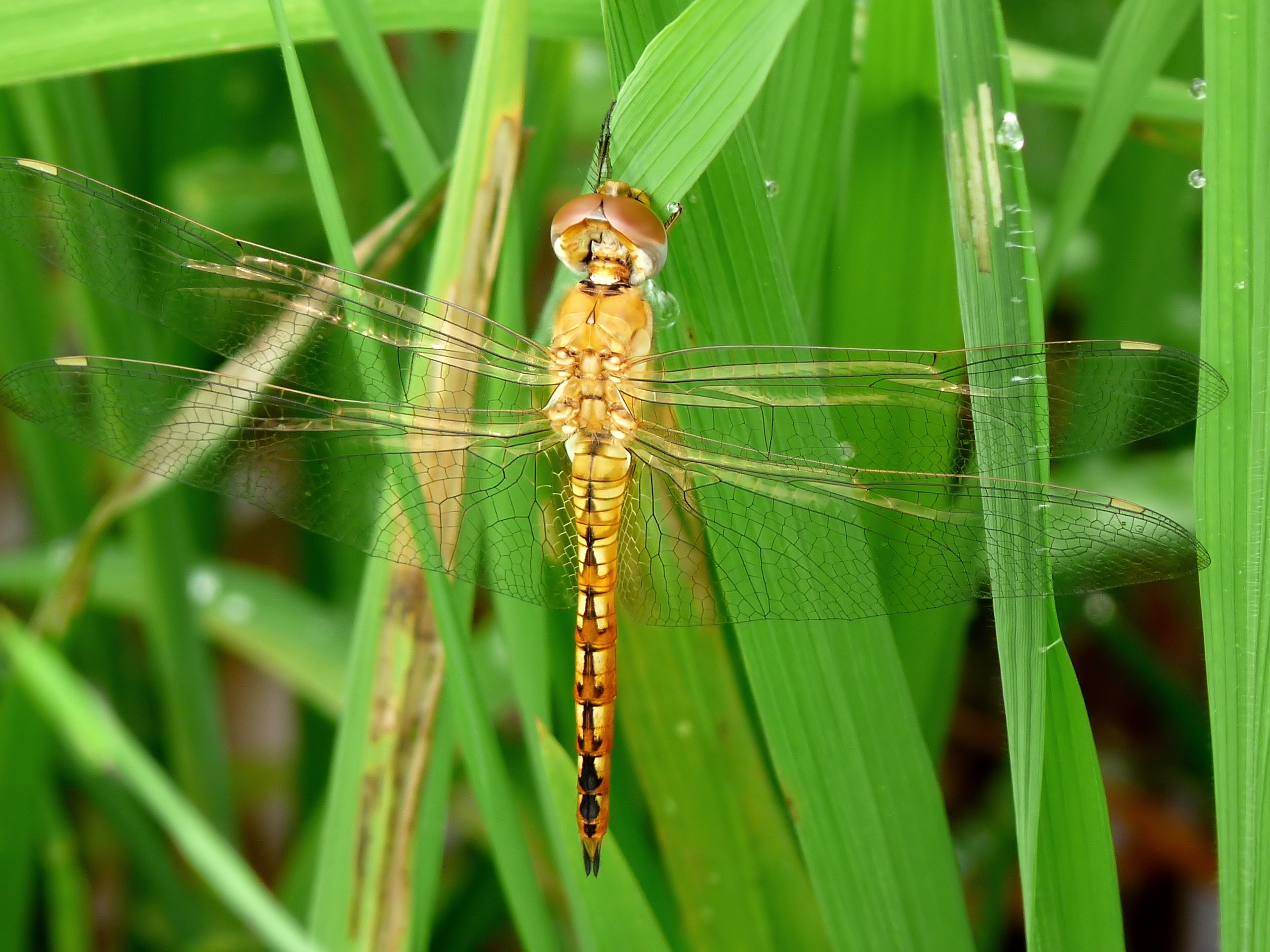
Pantala flavescens female

==== Genus: Potamarcha ====
===== Species: Potamarcha congener =====
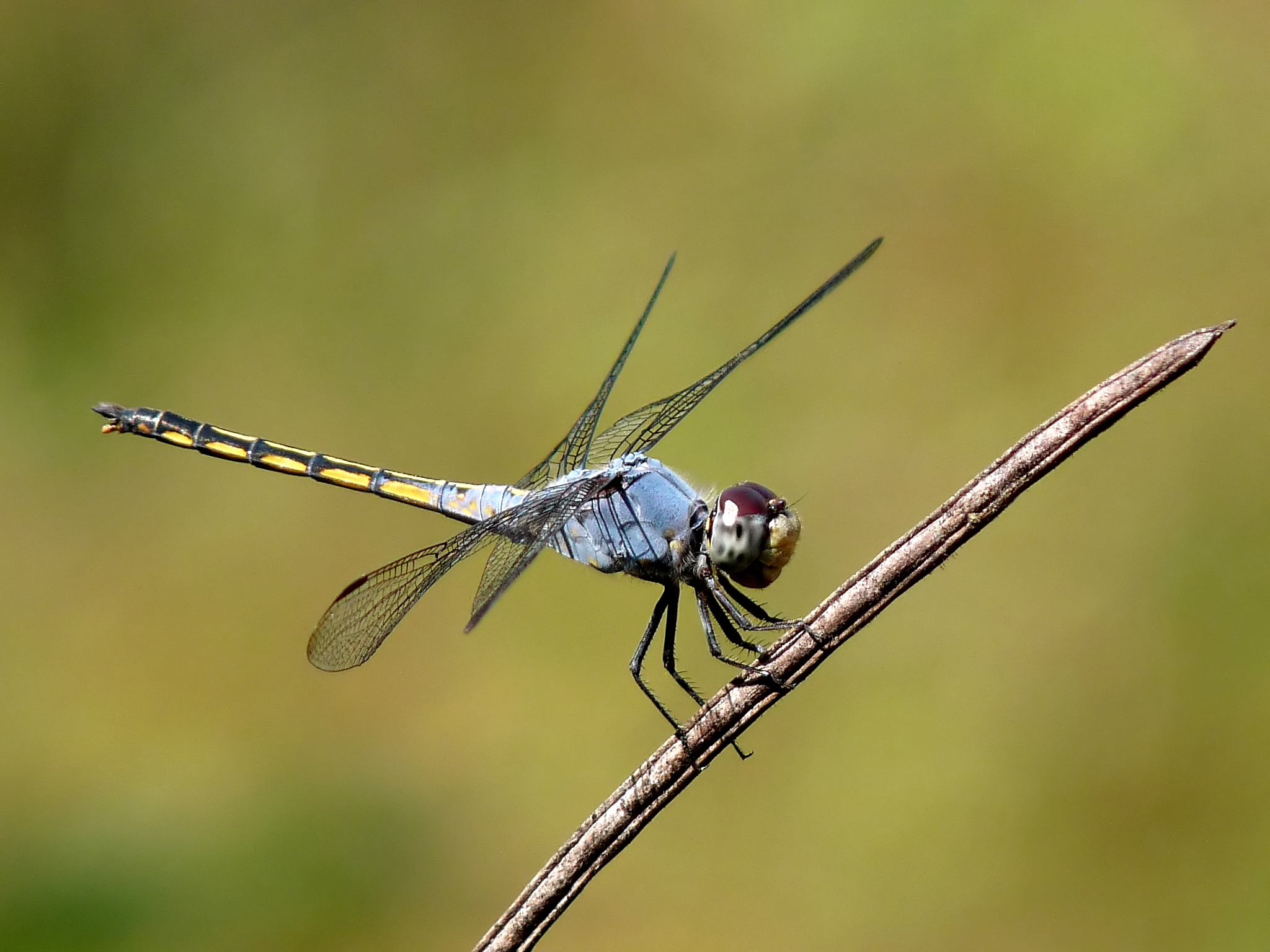
male

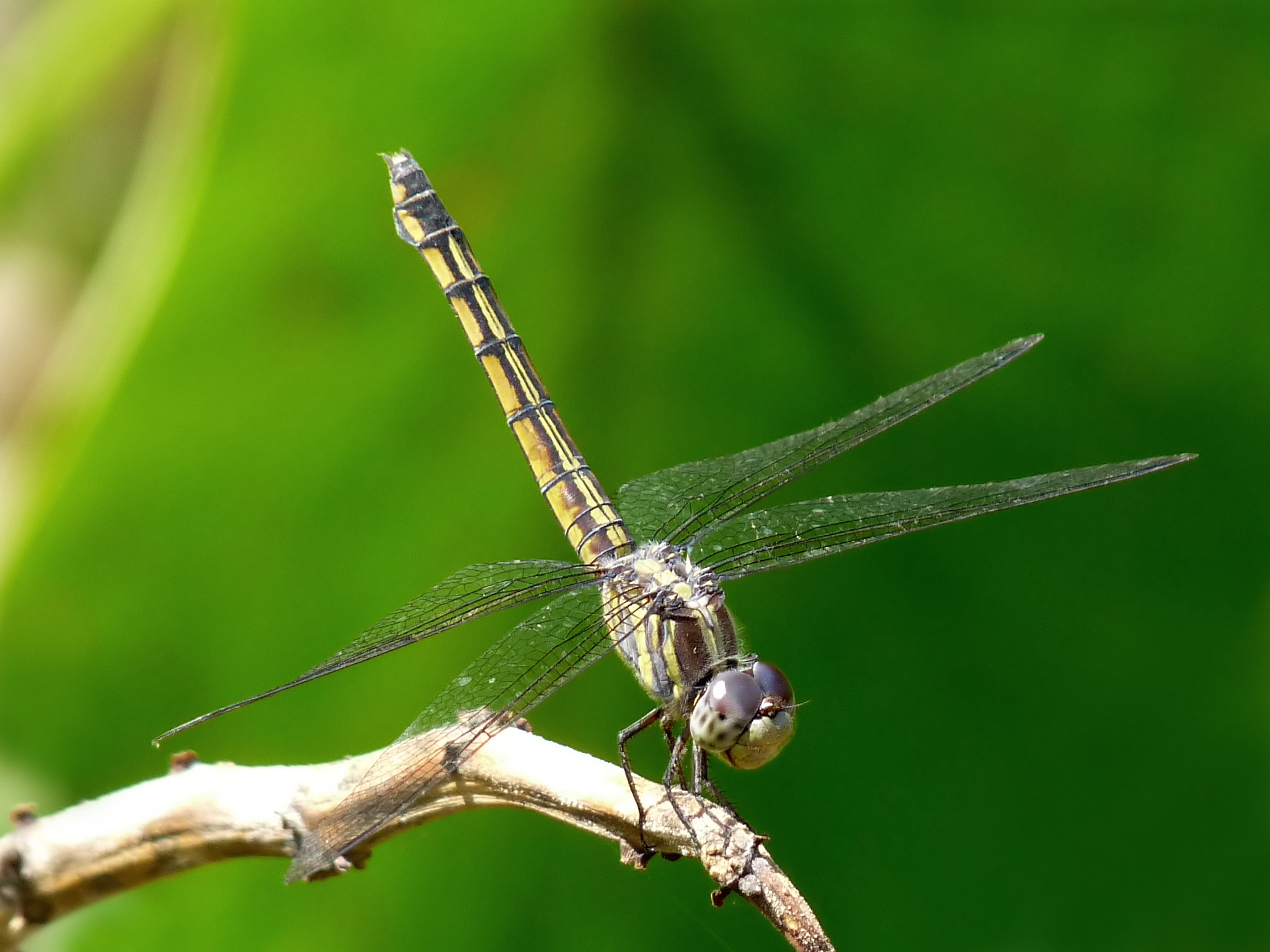
female

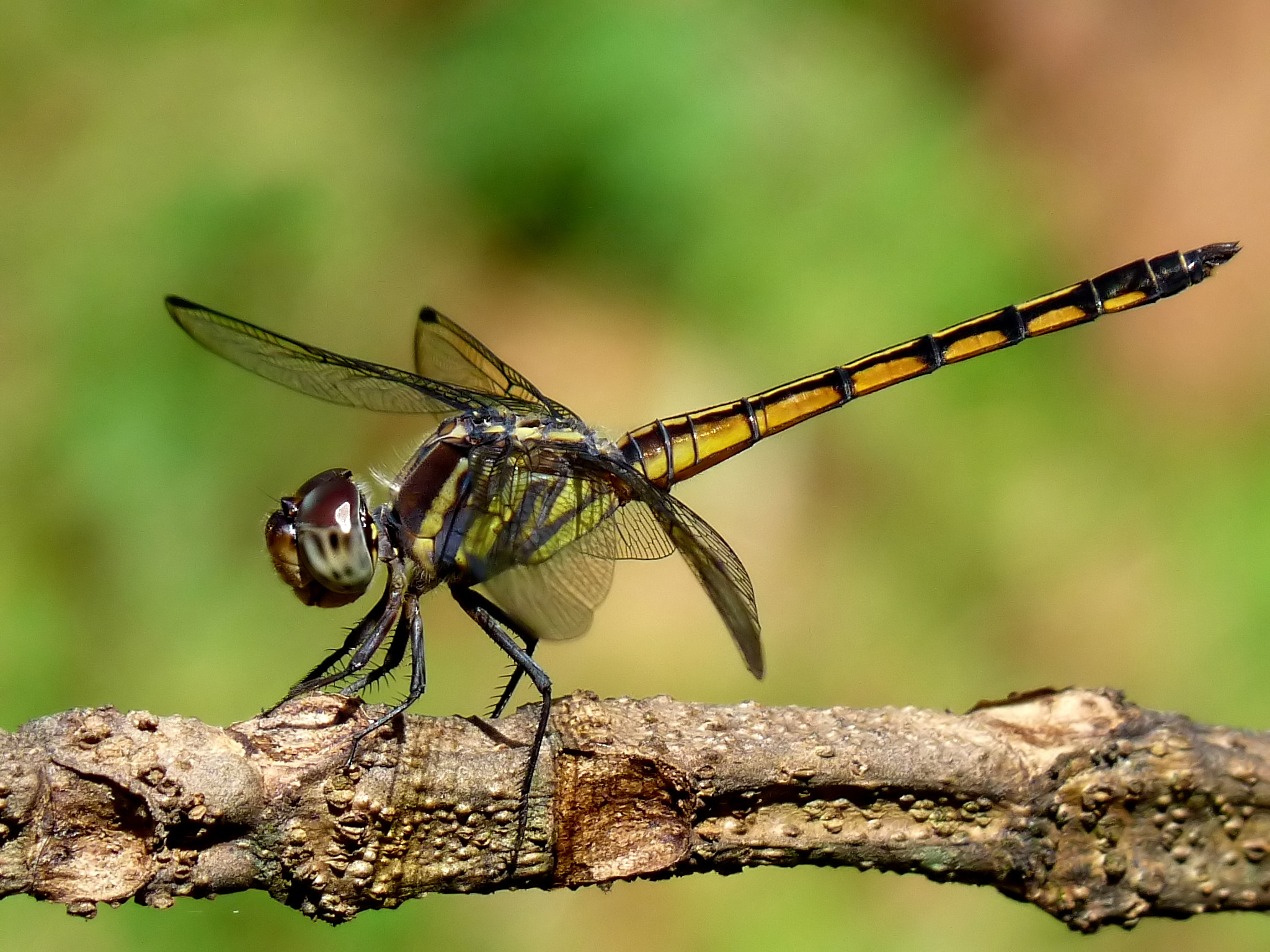
Juvenile male

==== Genus: Rhodothemis ====
===== Species: Rhodothemis rufa =====
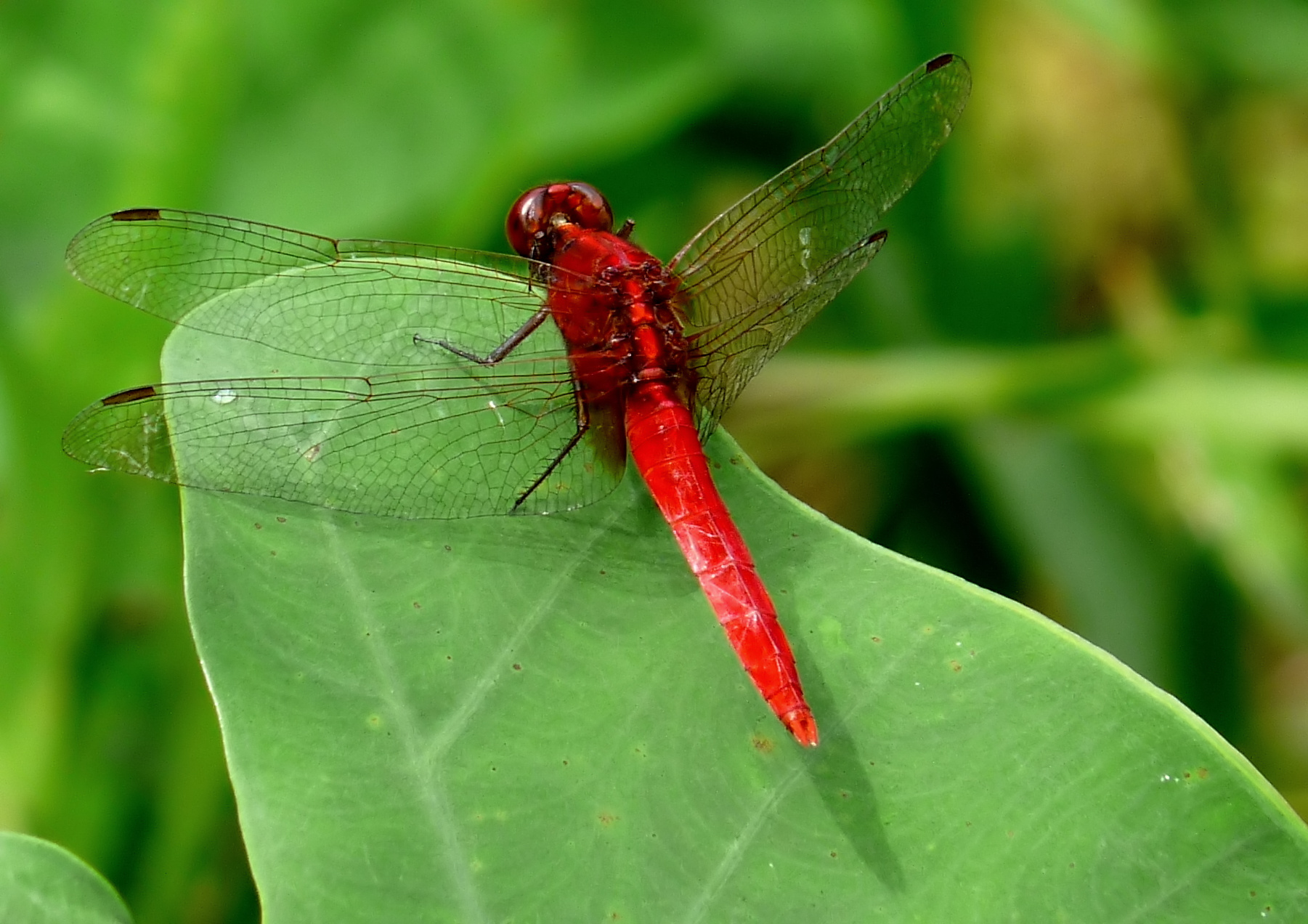
Rhodothemis rufa male

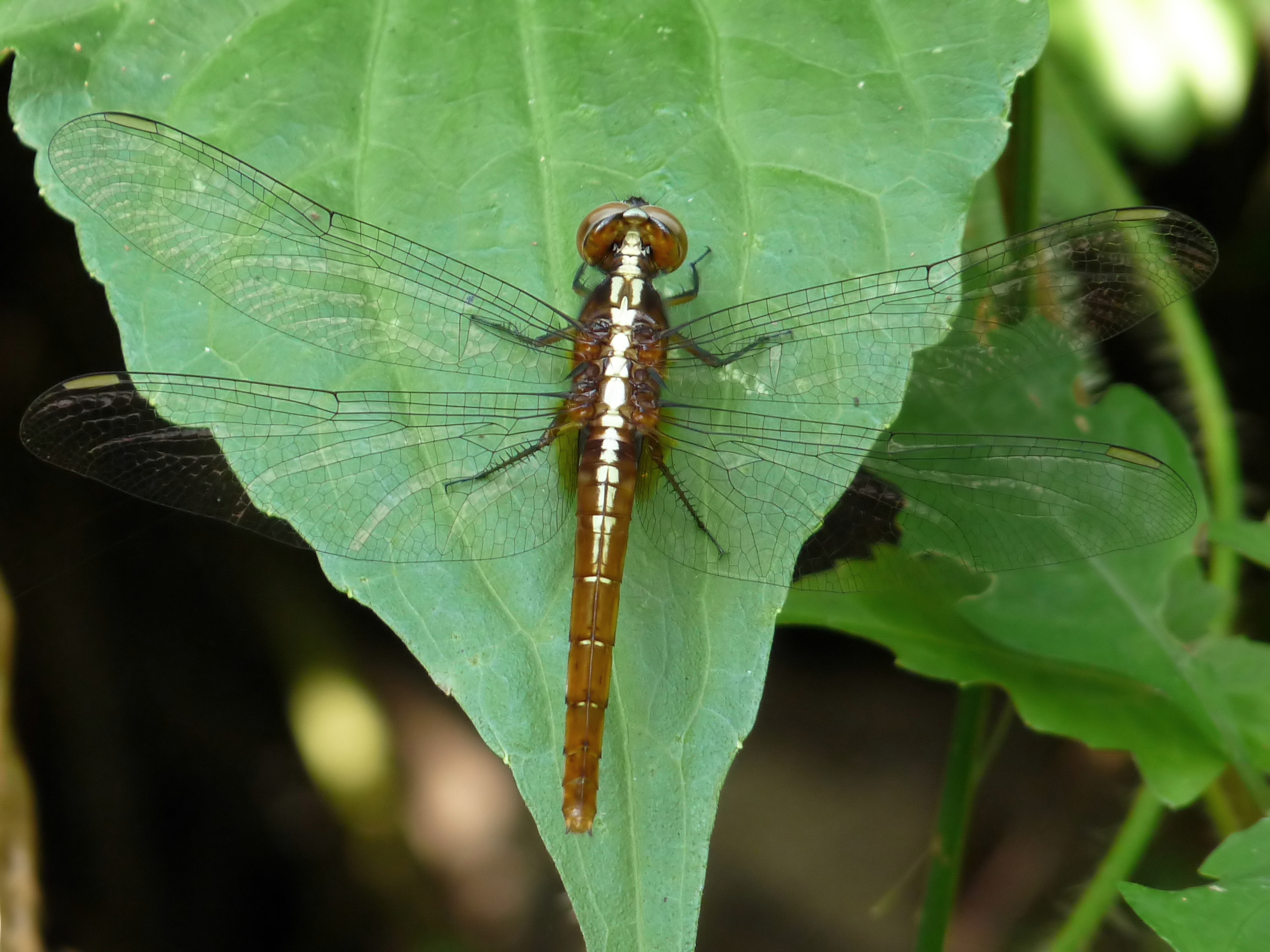
Rhodothemis rufa female

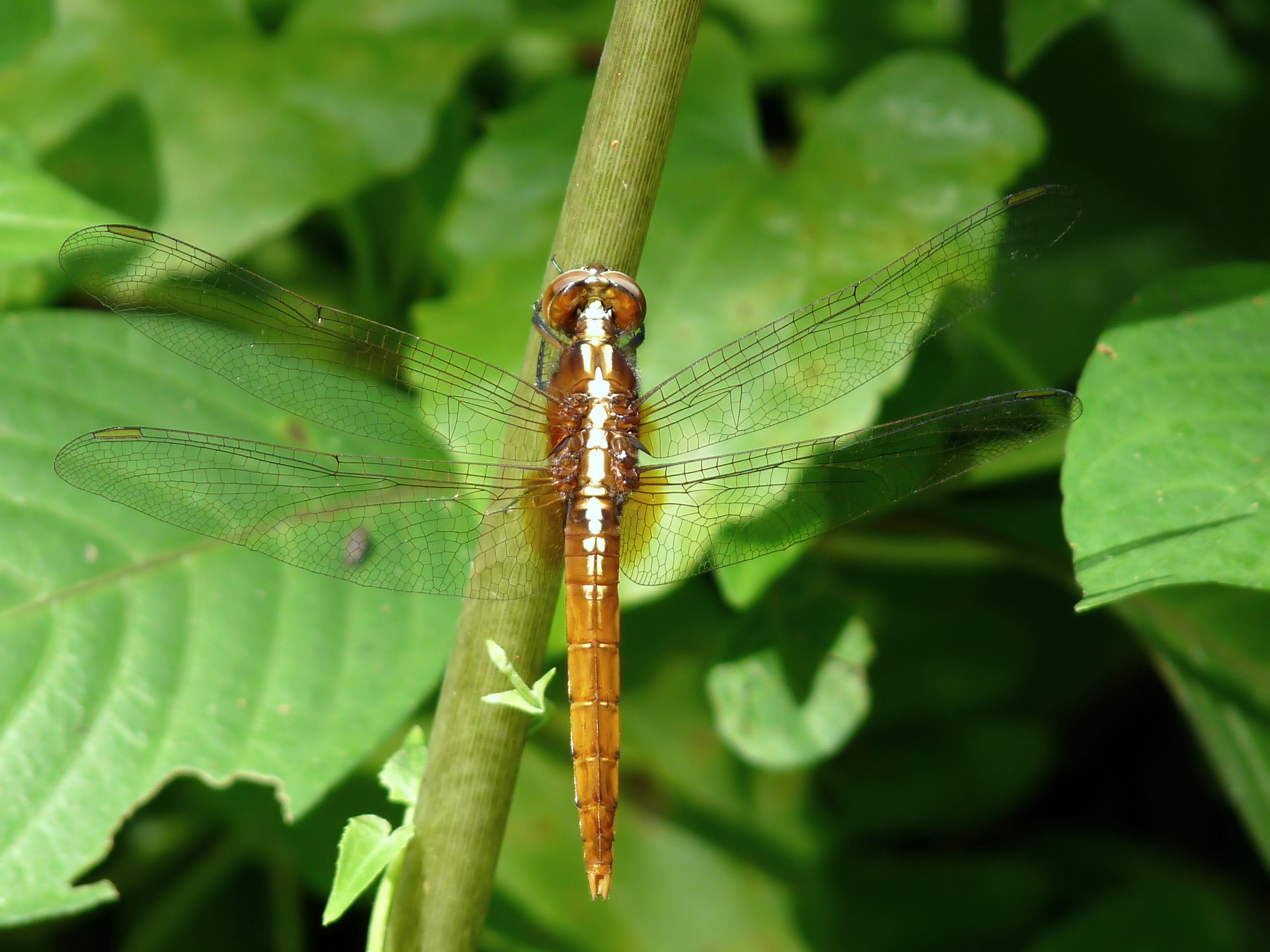
Rhodothemis rufa juvenile male

==== Genus: Rhyothemis ====
===== Species: Rhyothemis triangularis =====
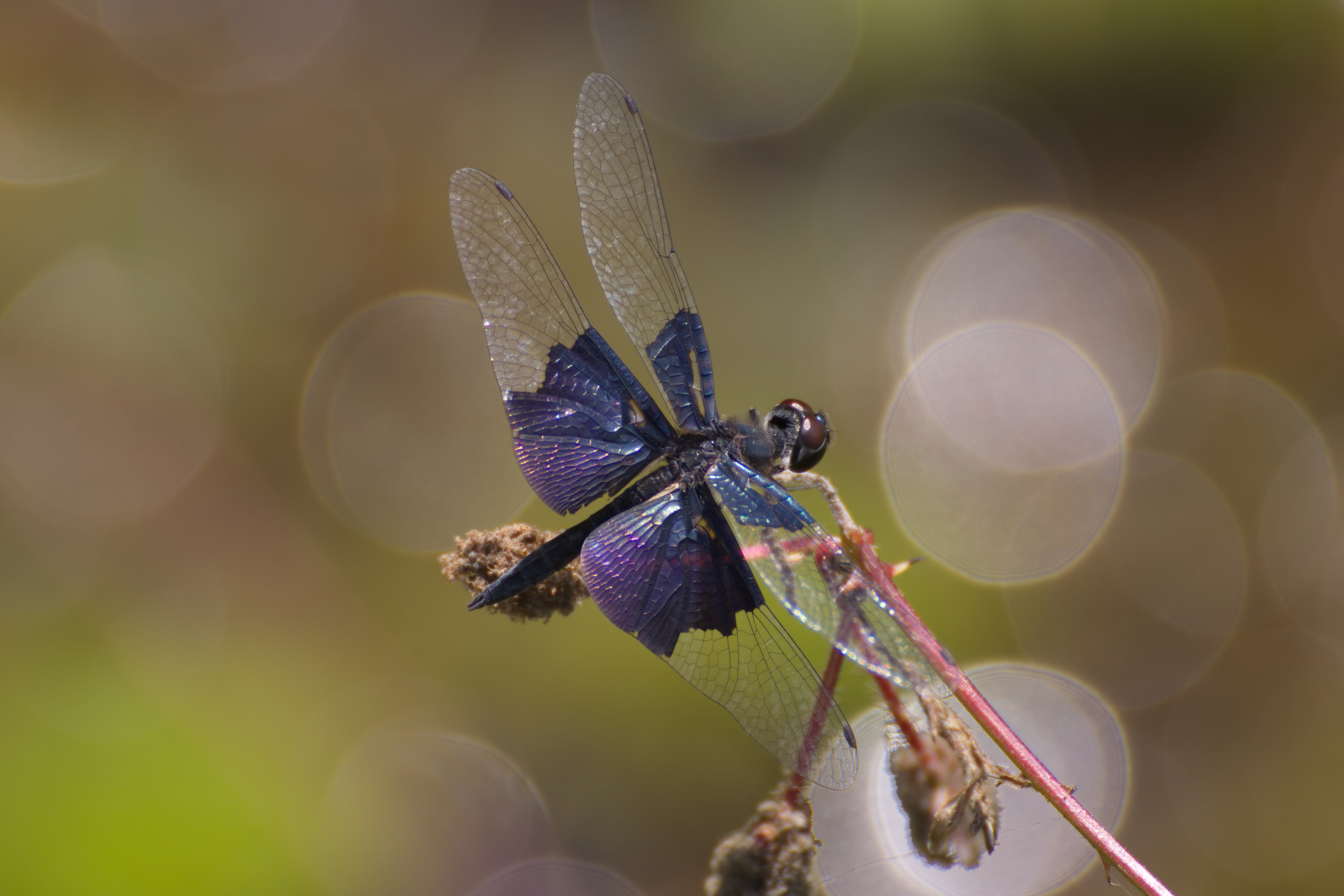
Rhyothemis triangularis male

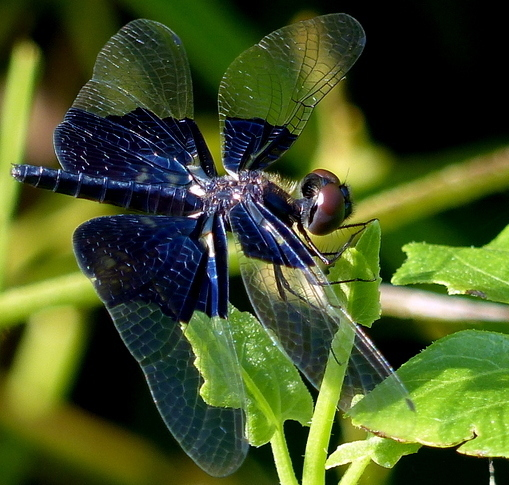
Rhyothemis triangularis female

===== Species: Rhyothemis variegata =====
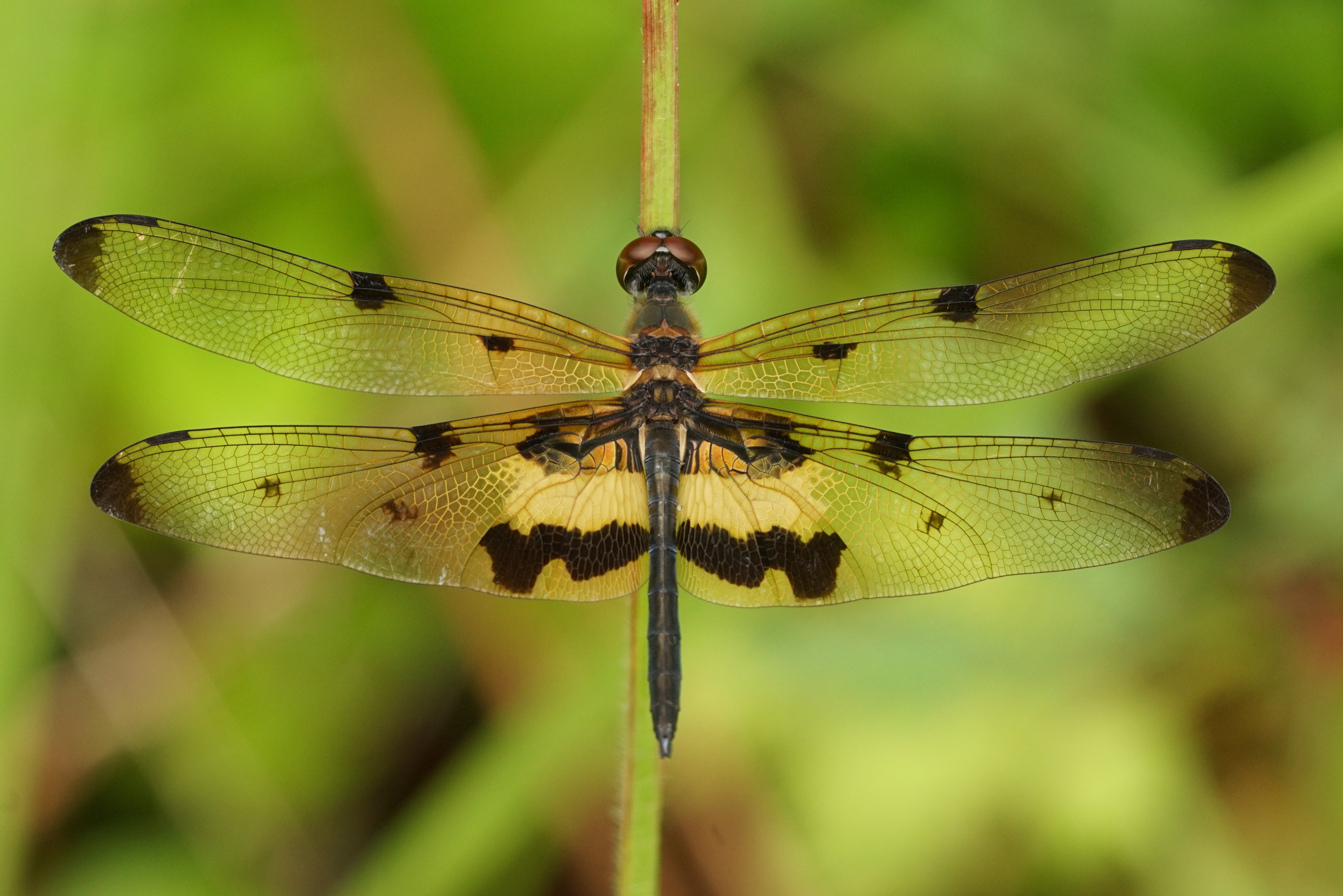
Rhyothemis variegata male

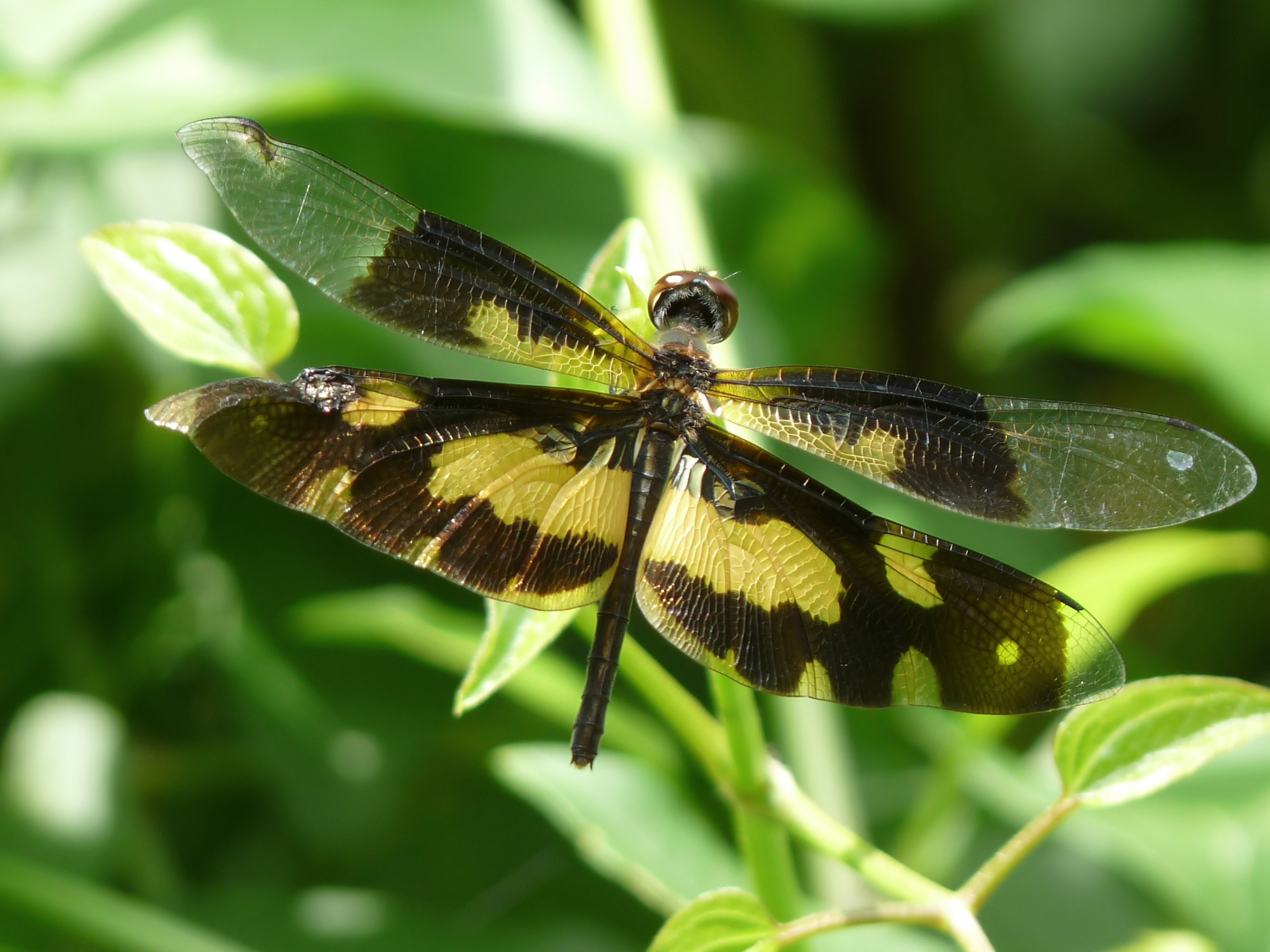
Rhyothemis variegata female

==== Genus: Sympetrum ====
===== Species: Sympetrum fonscolombii =====
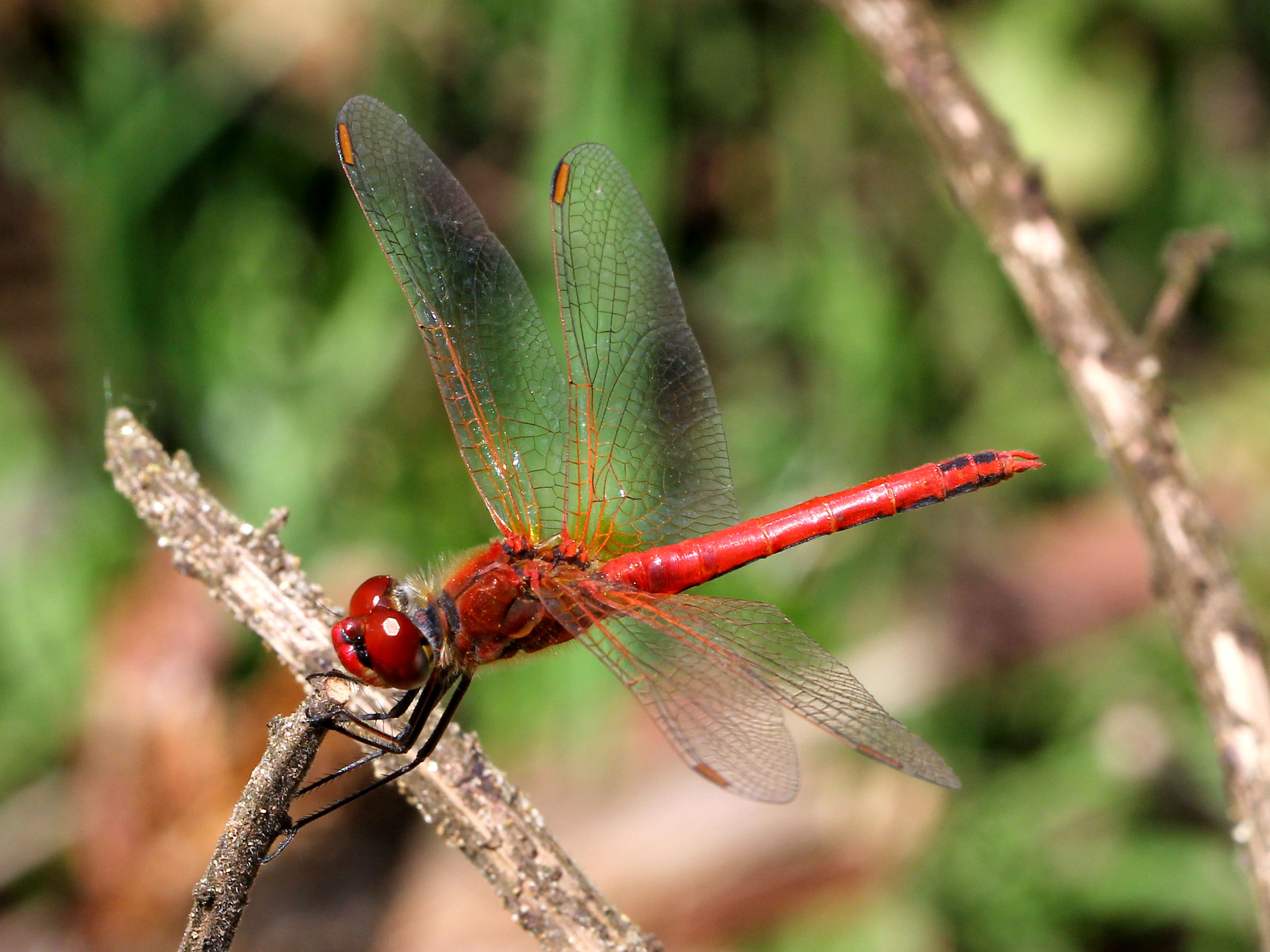
male

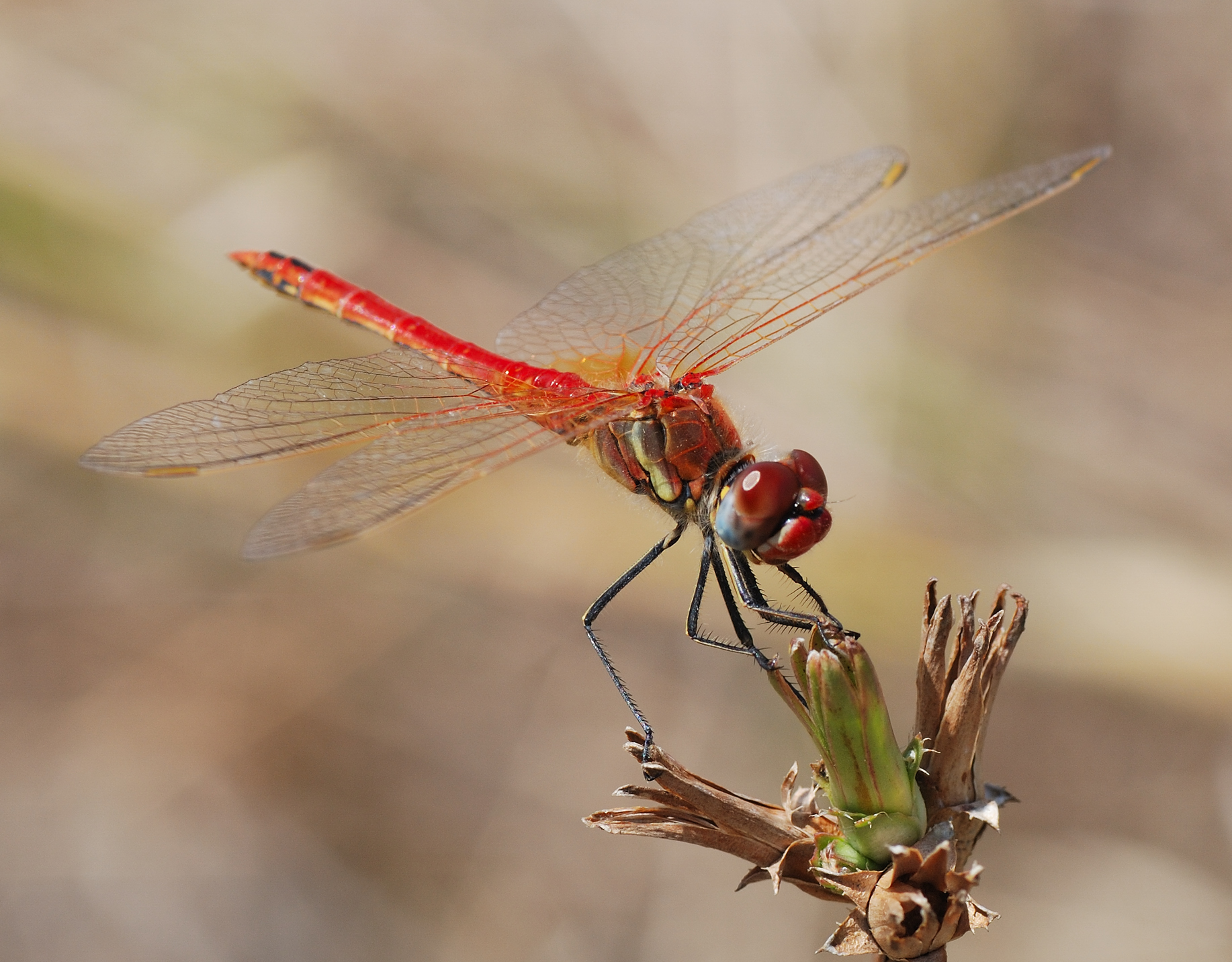
Sympetrum fonscolombii male

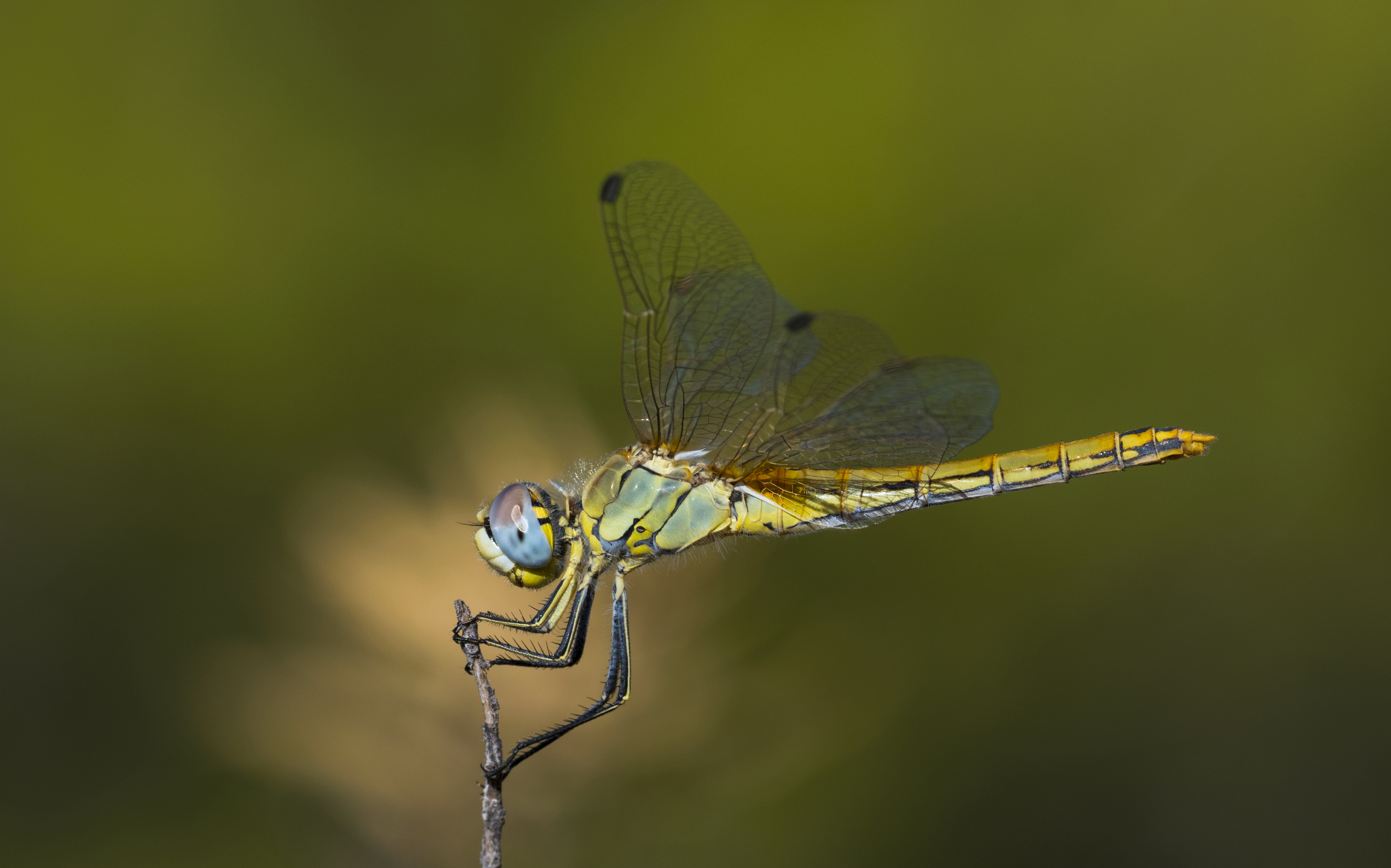
Sympetrum fonscolombii female

==== Genus: Tetrathemis ====
===== Species: Tetrathemis platyptera =====
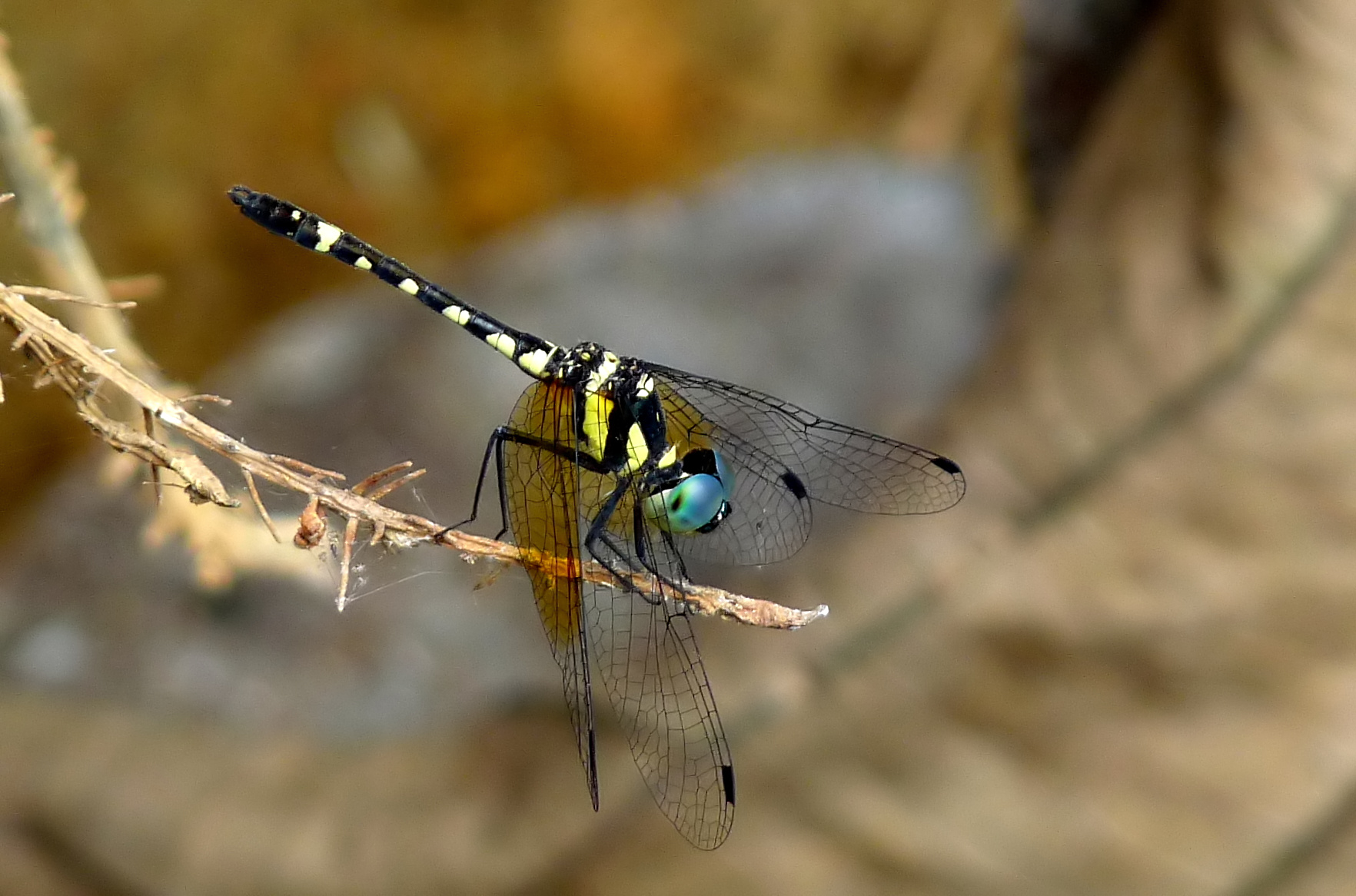
Tetrathemis platyptera male

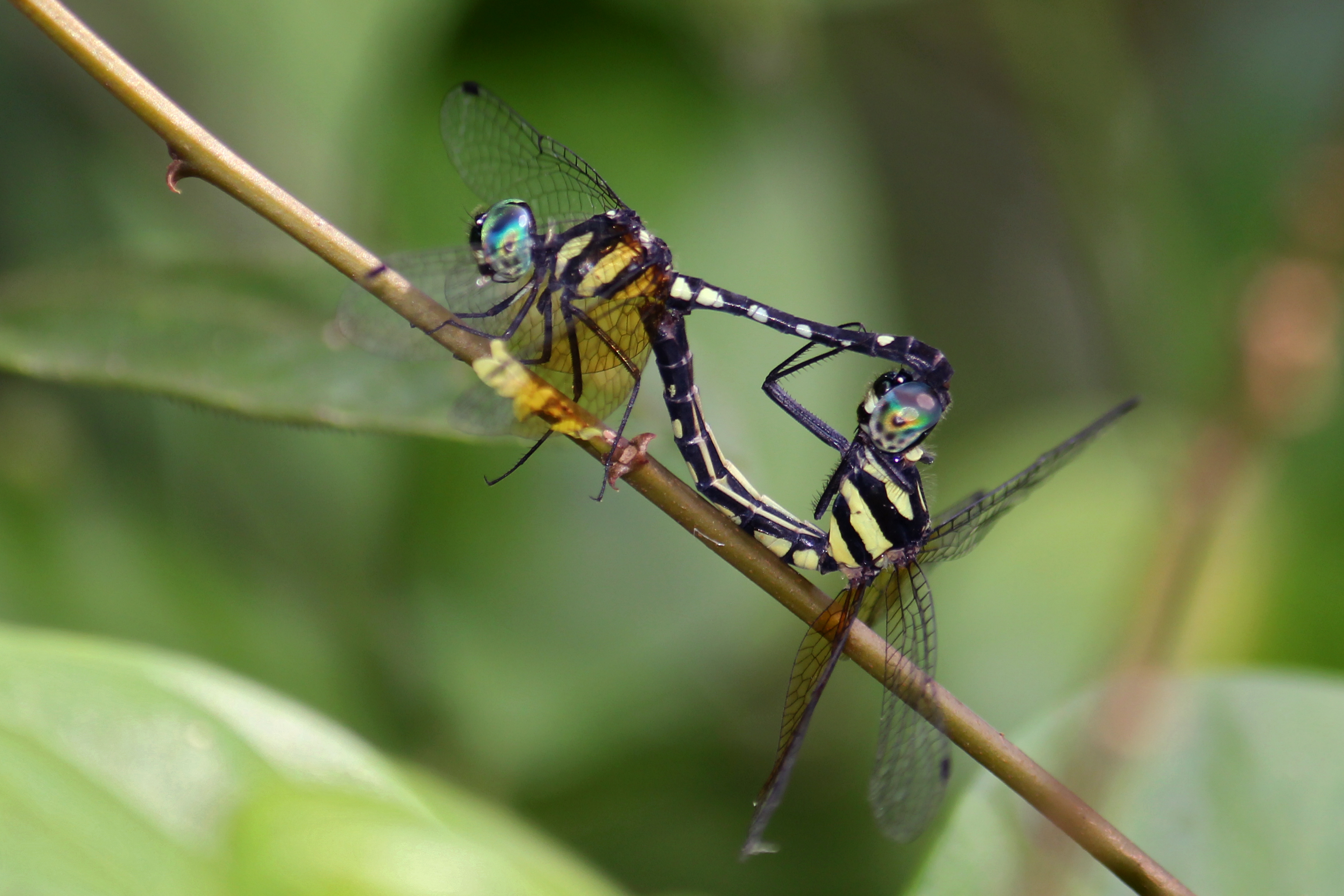
Tetrathemis platyptera mating

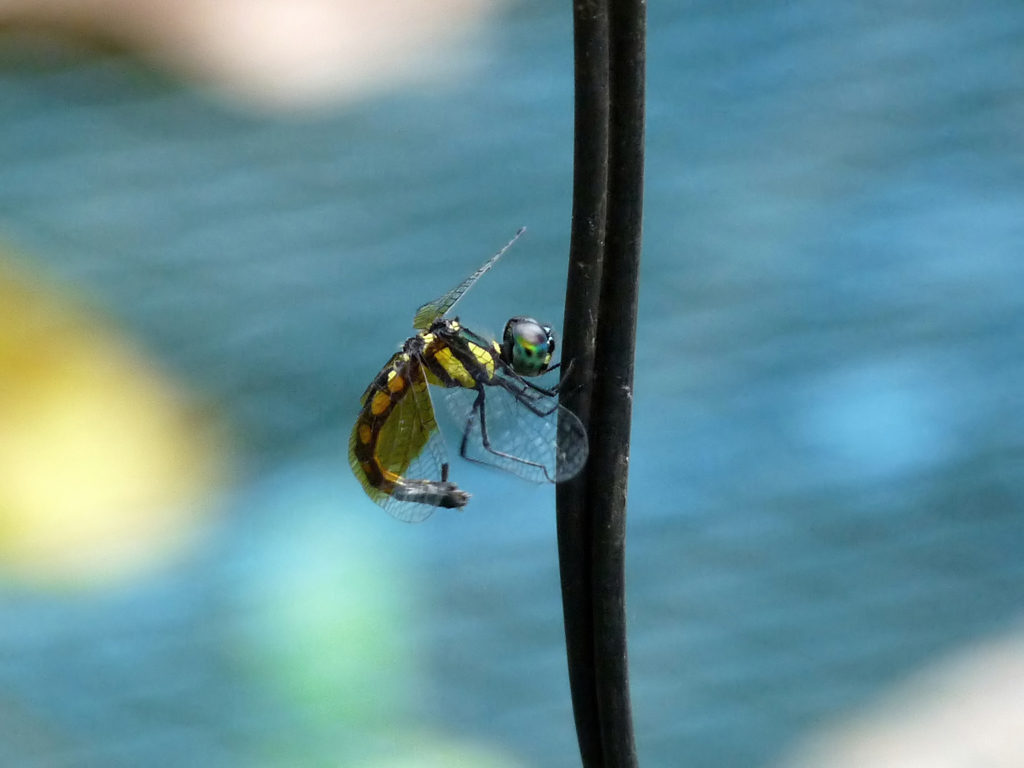
Tetrathemis platyptera egg-laying

==== Genus: Tholymis ====
===== Species: Tholymis tillarga =====
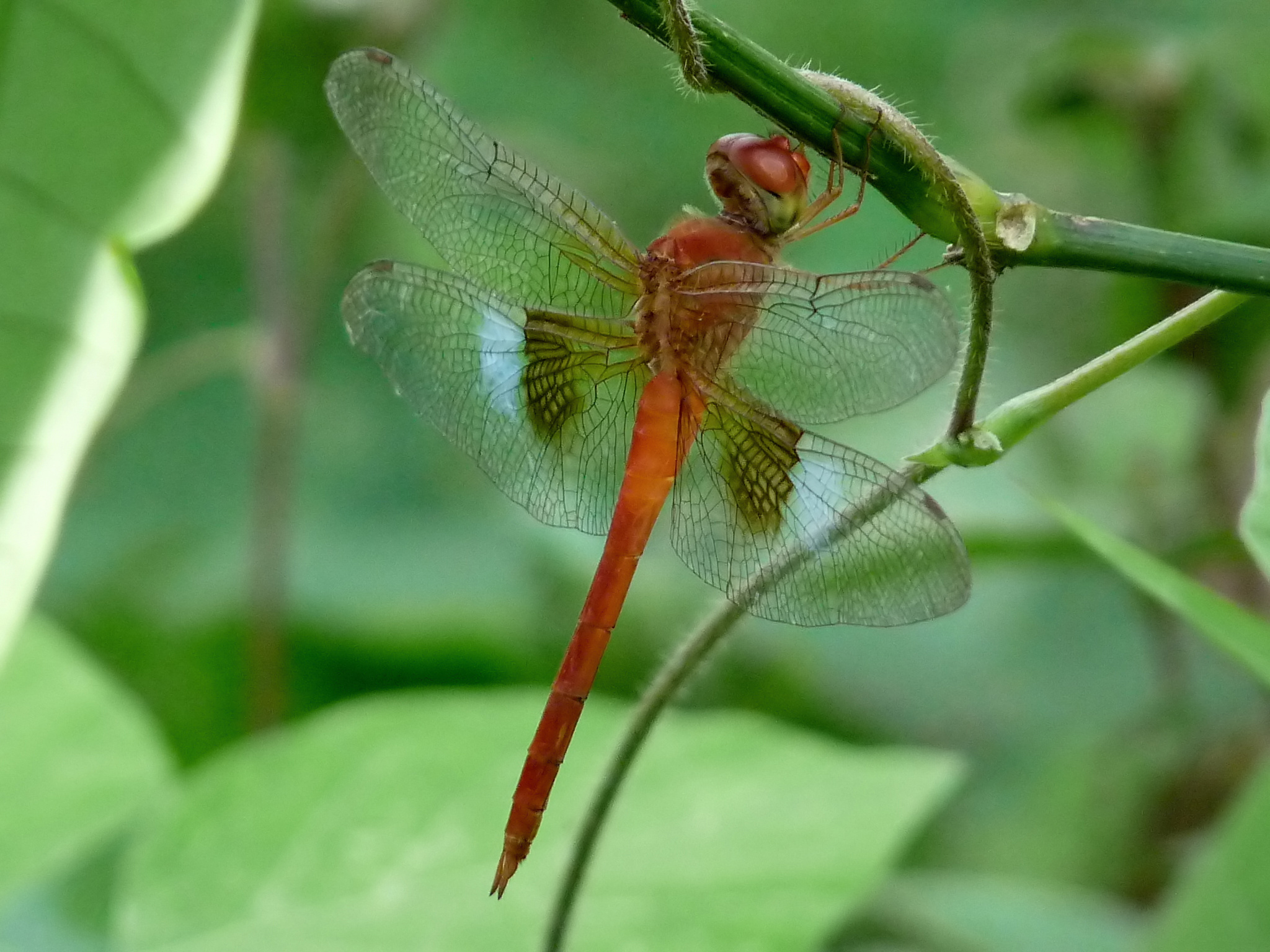
Tholymis tillarga male

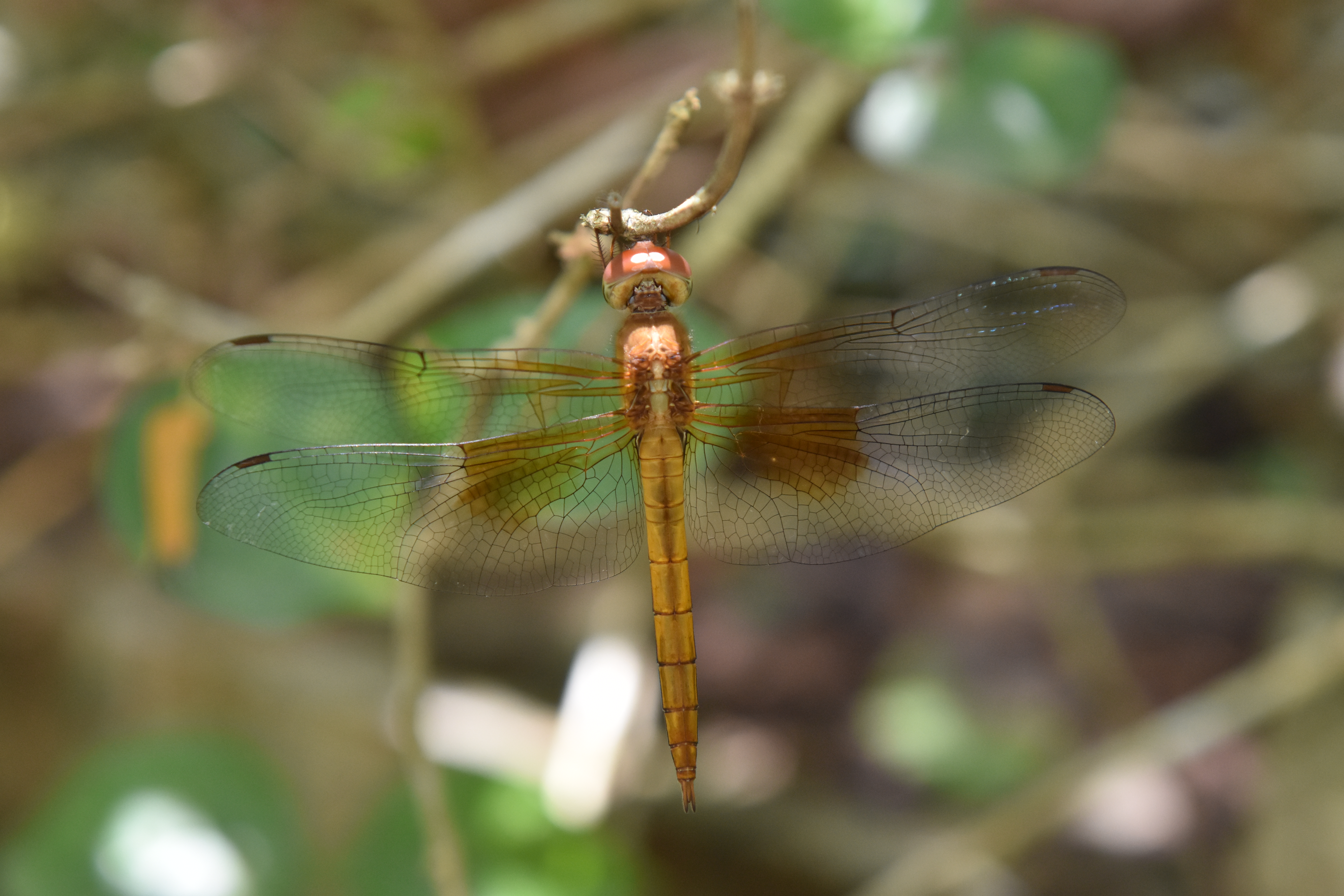
young male

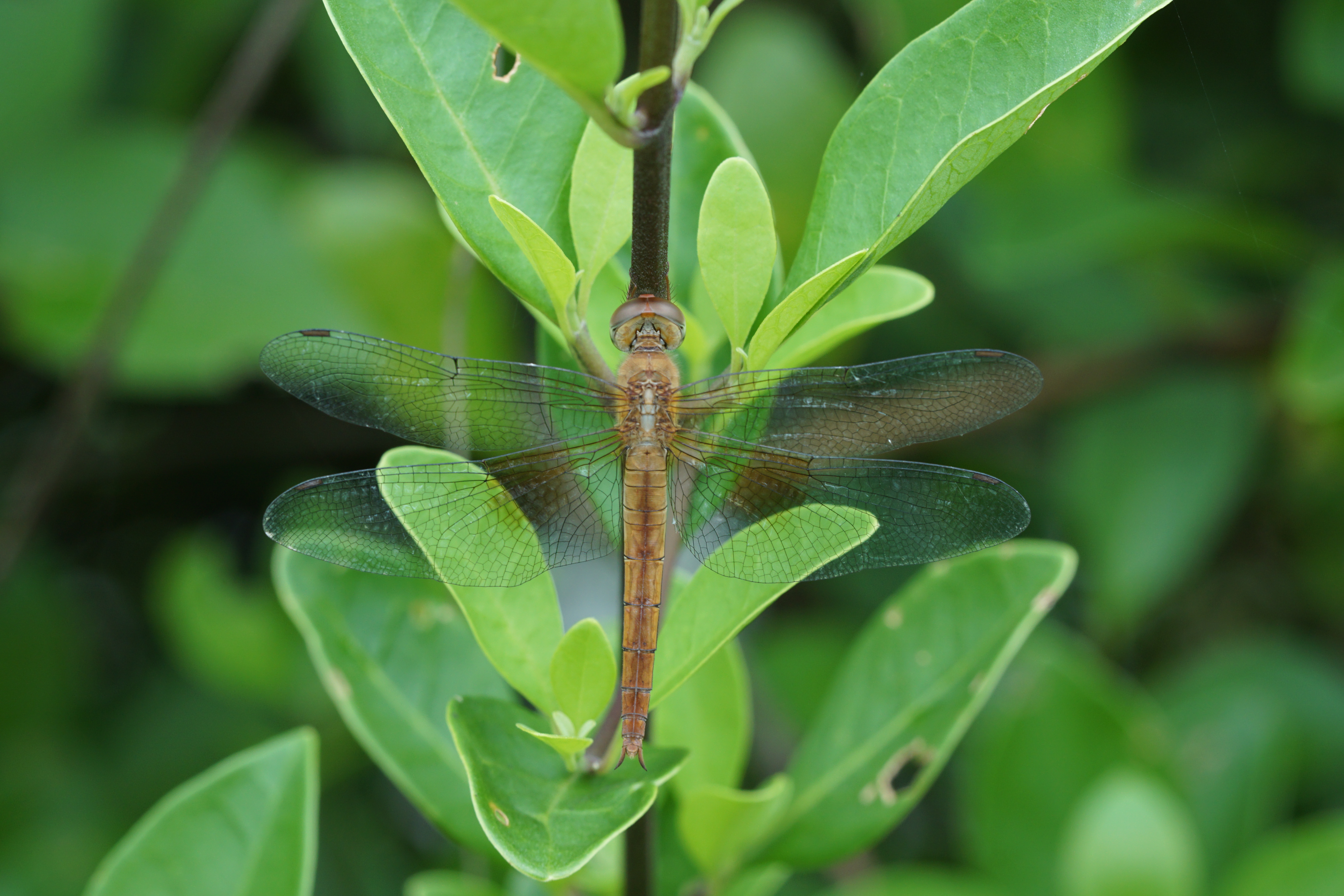
Tholymis tillarga female

==== Genus: Tramea ====
===== Species: Tramea basilaris =====
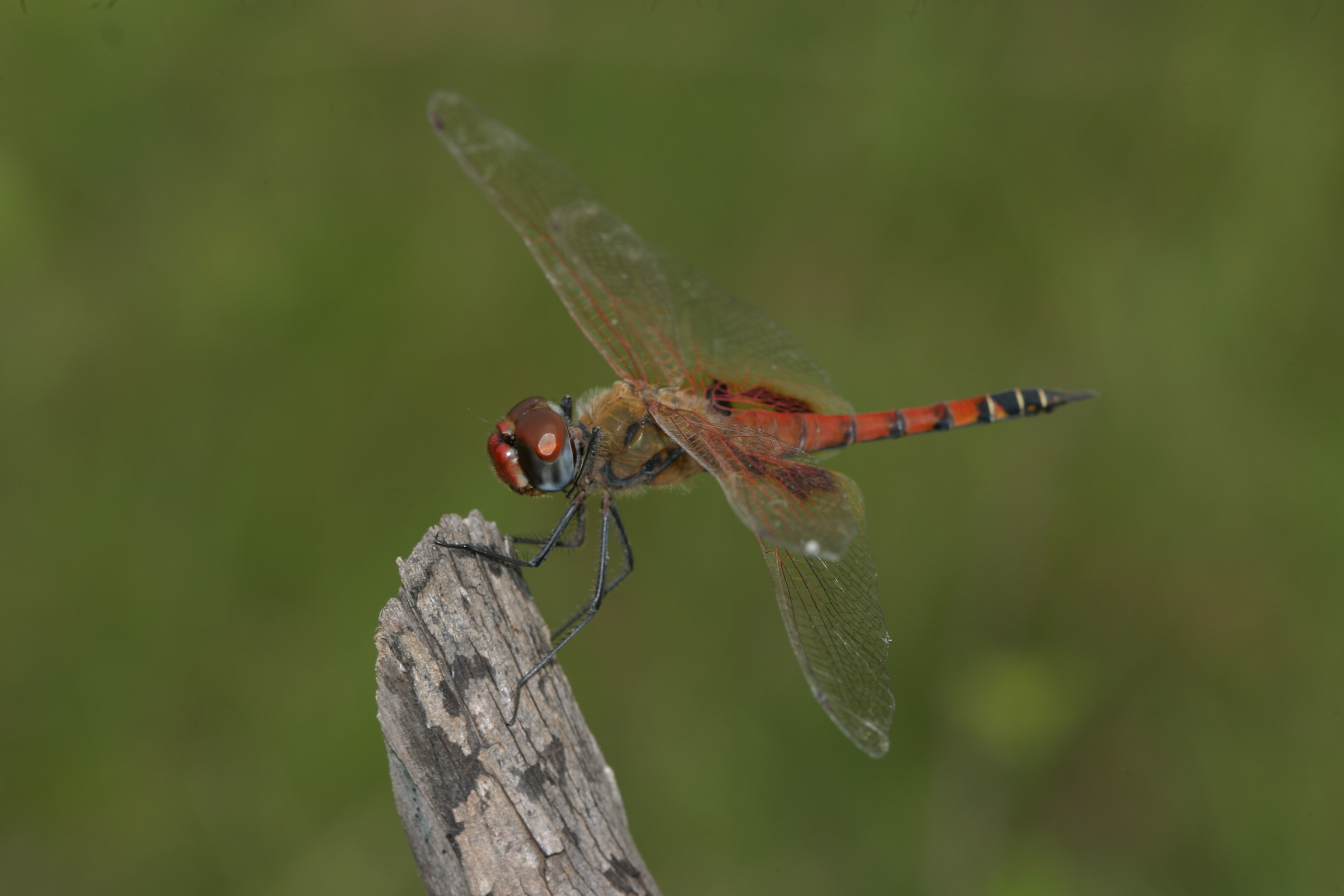
Tramea basilaris male

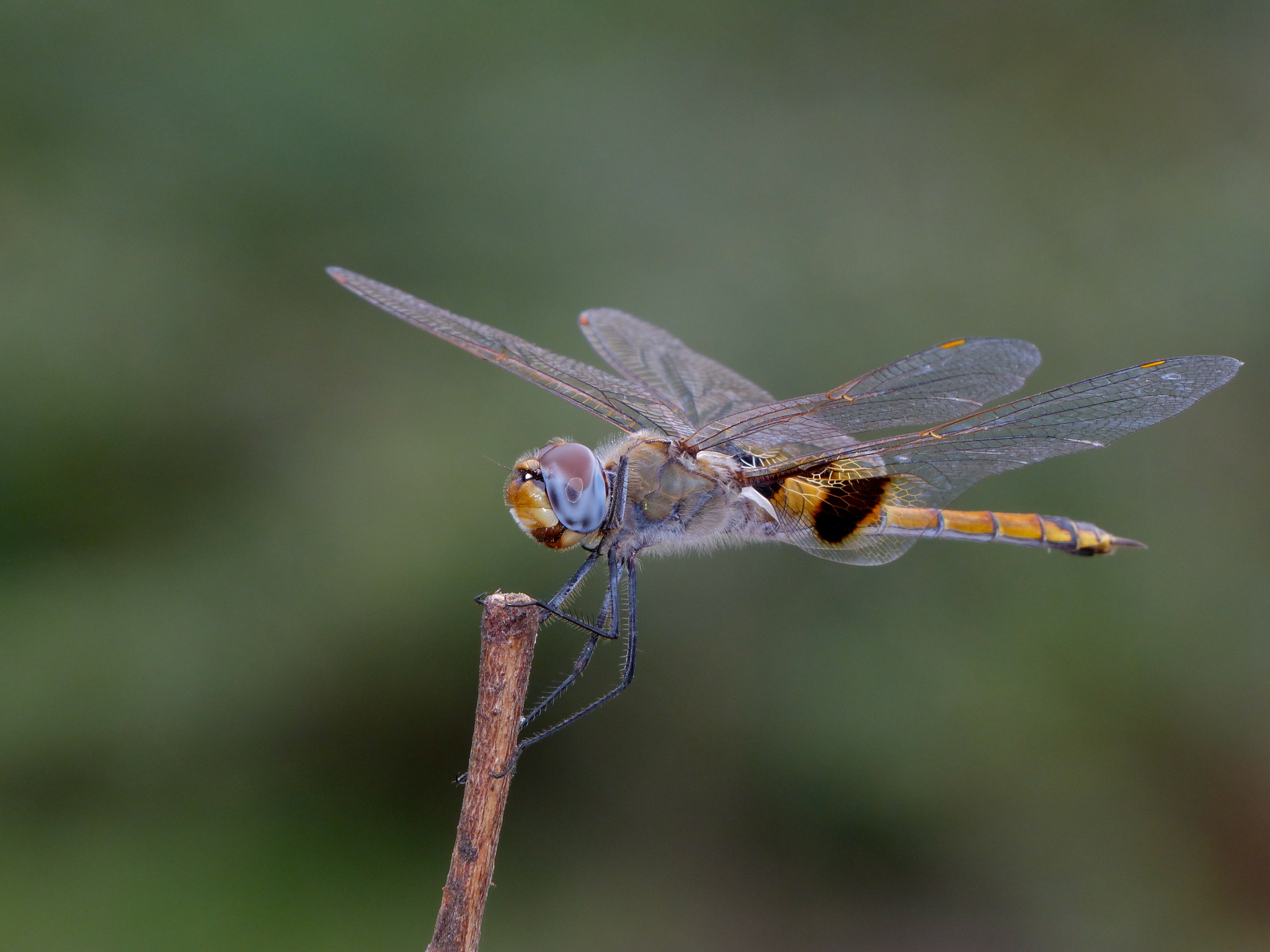
Tramea basilaris female

===== Species: Tramea limbata =====
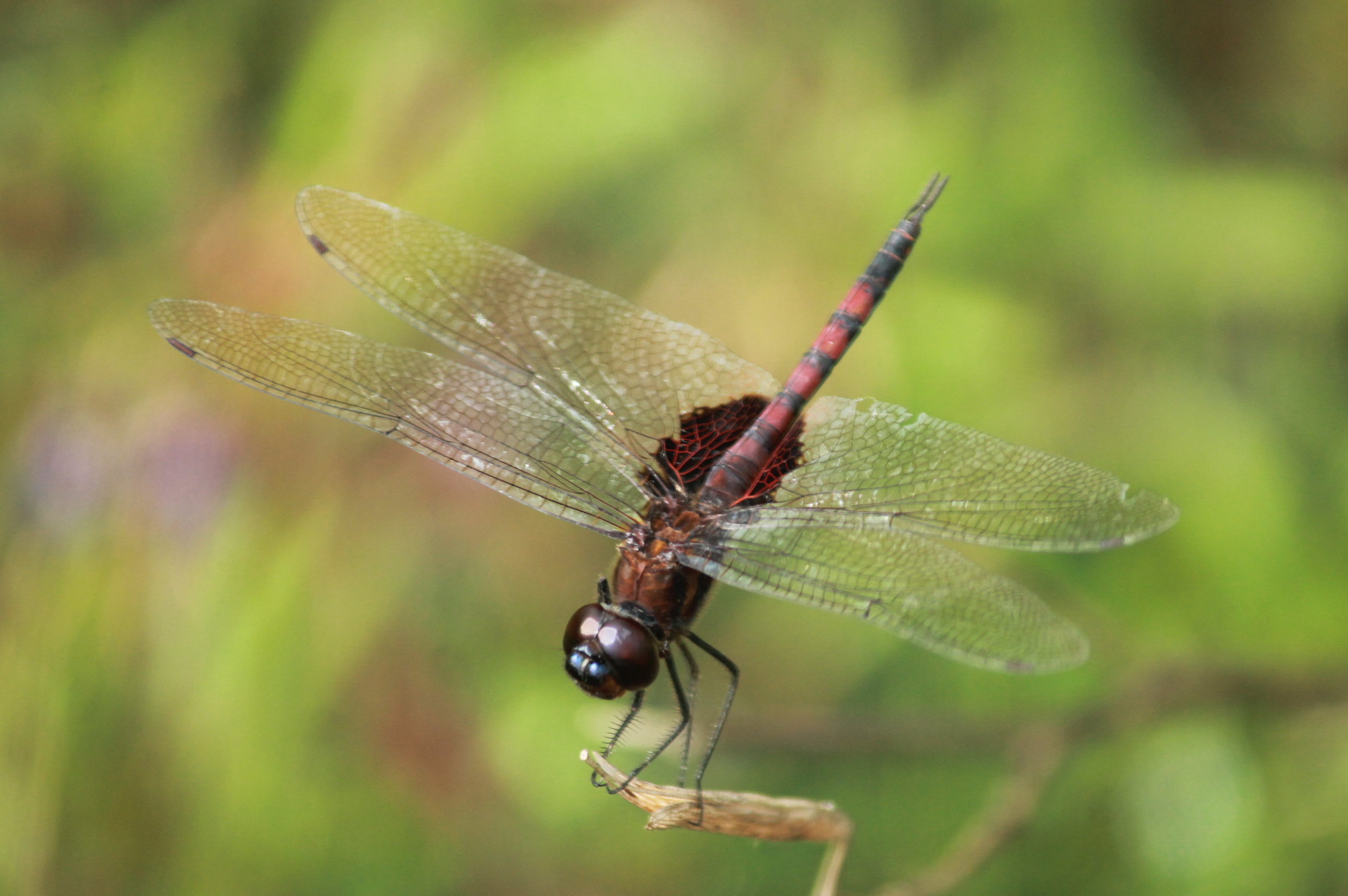
male

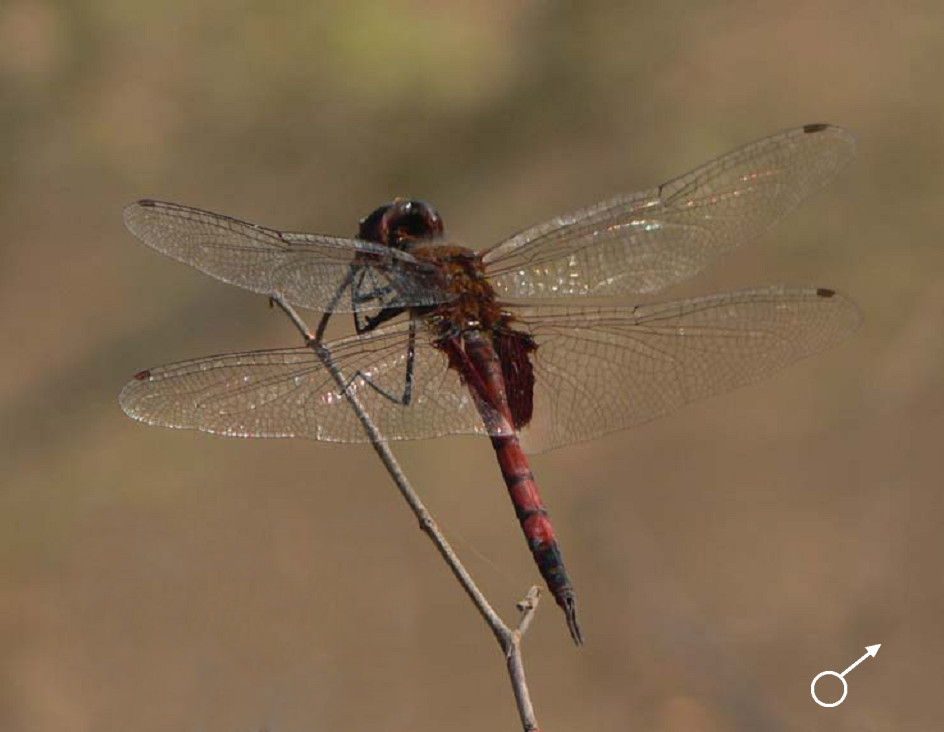
Tramea limbata male

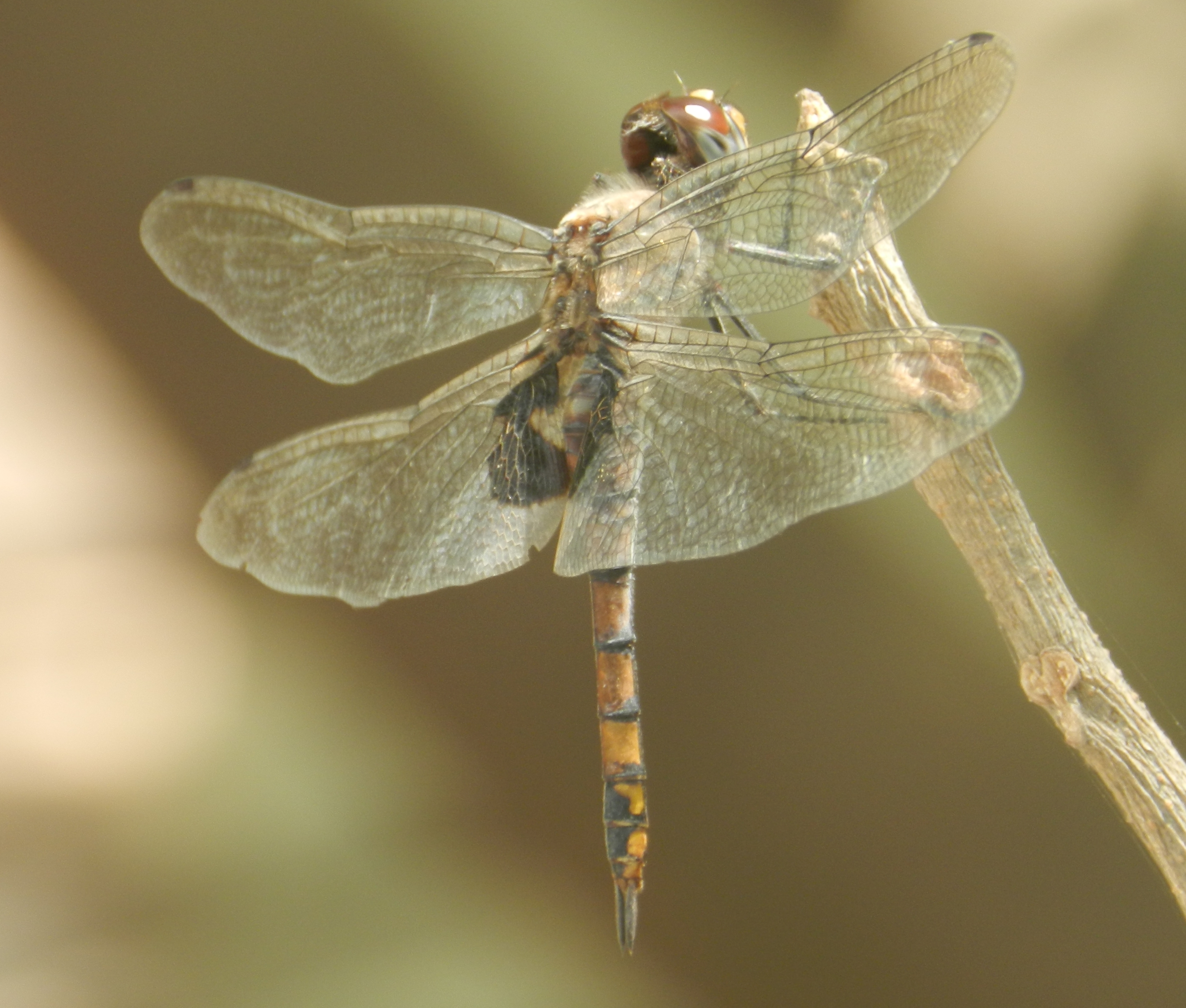
Tramea limbata female

==== Genus: Trithemis ====
===== Species: Trithemis aurora =====
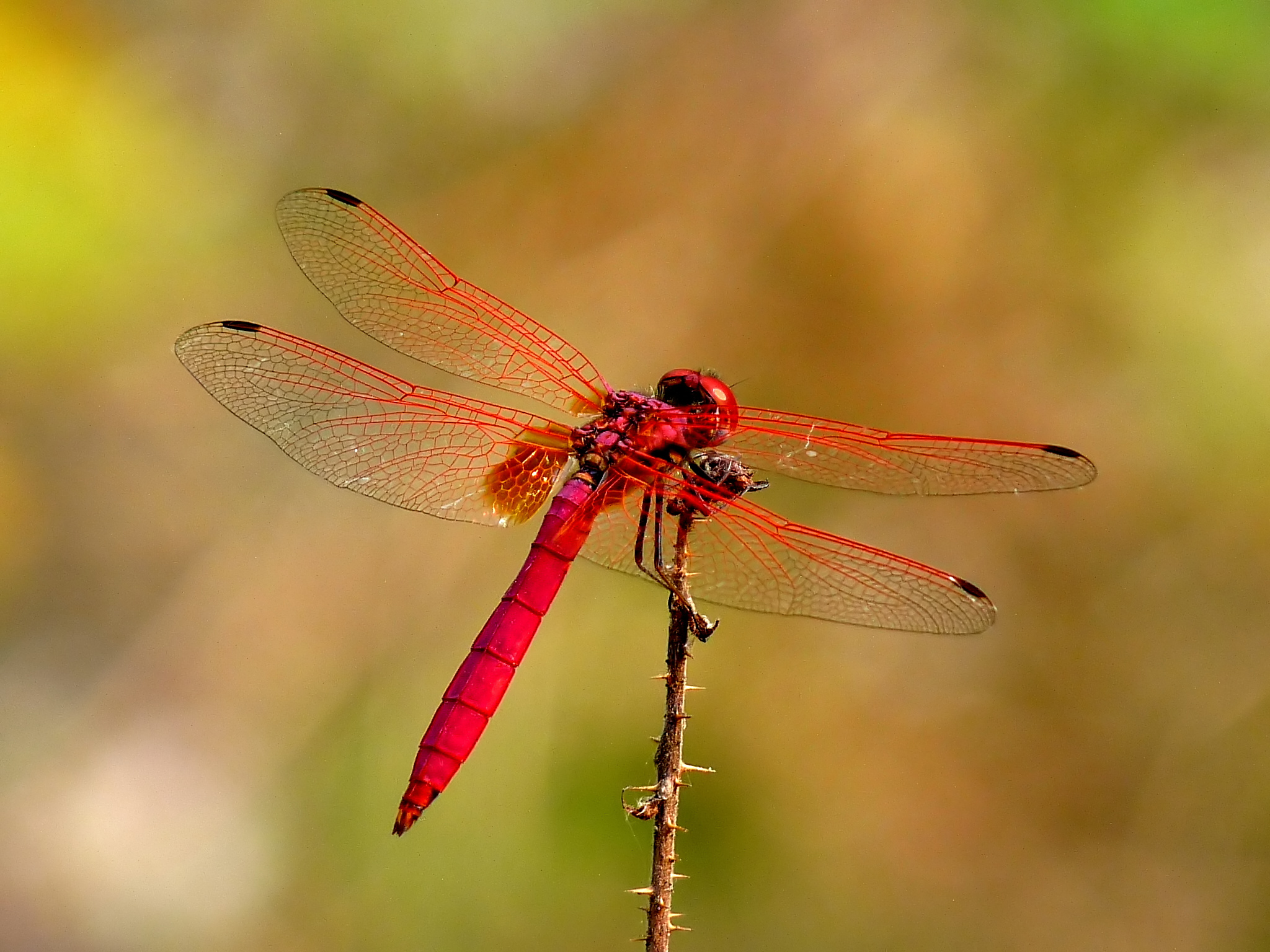
Trithemis aurora male

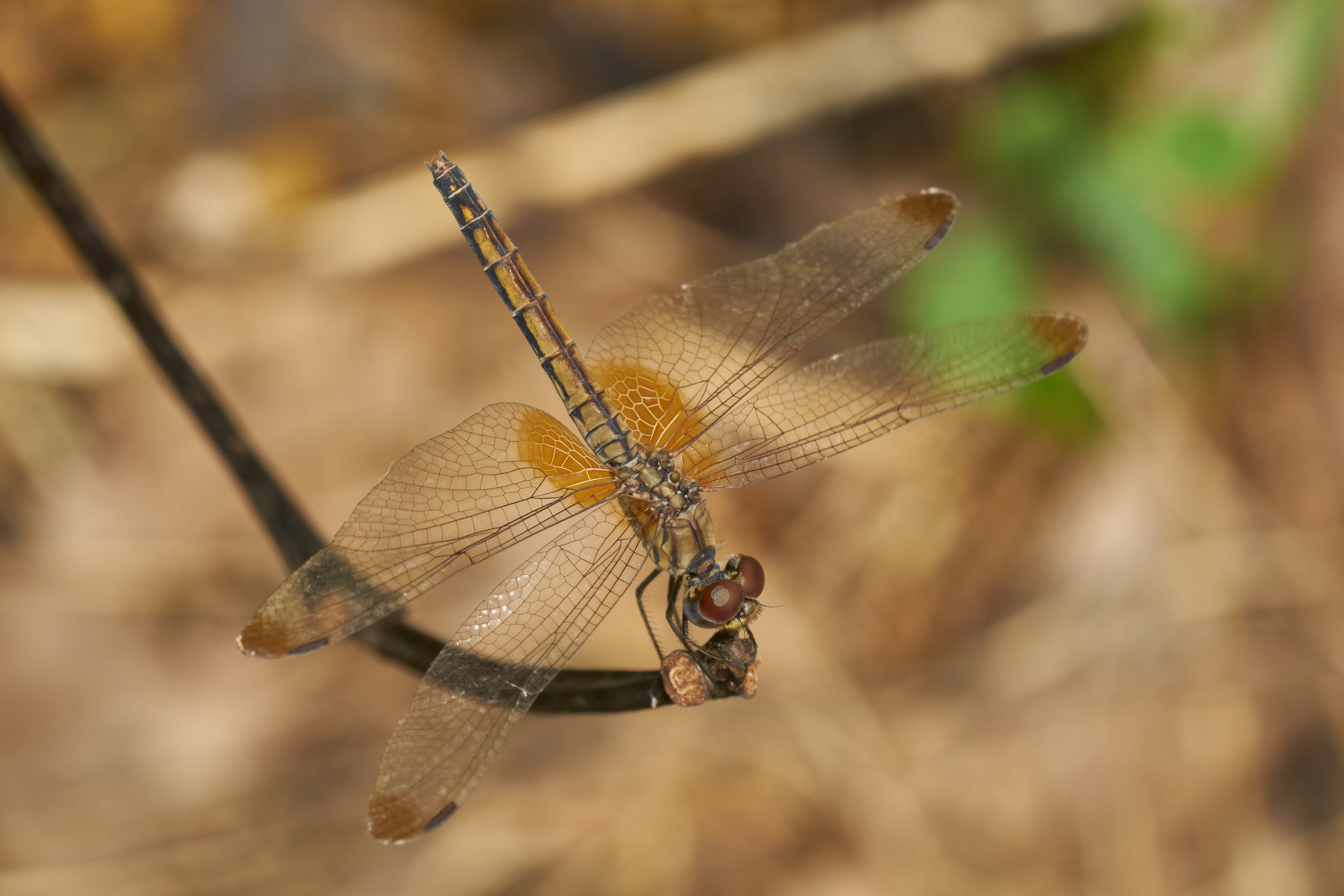
Trithemis aurora female

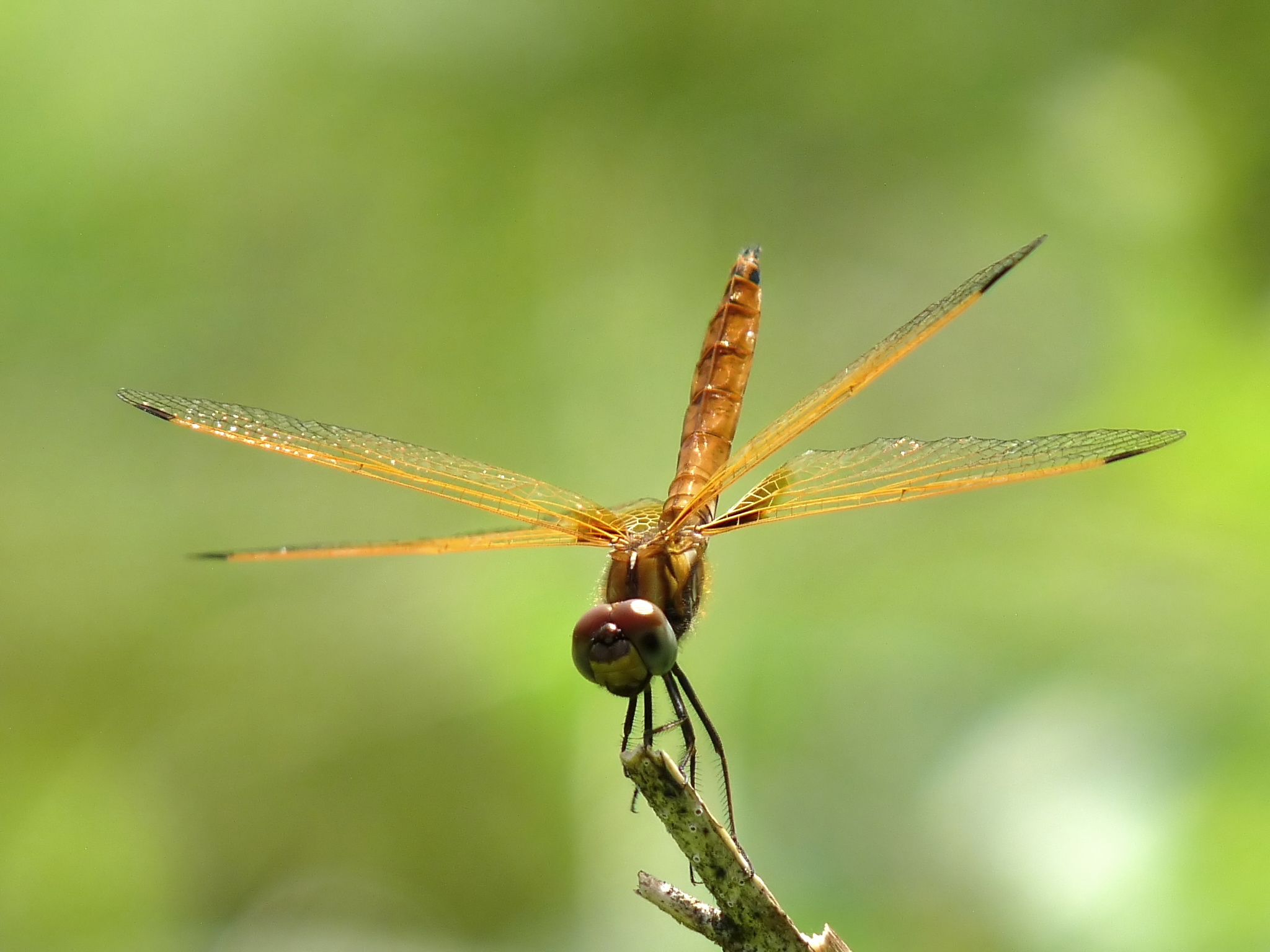
Trithemis aurora juvenile male

===== Species: Trithemis festiva =====
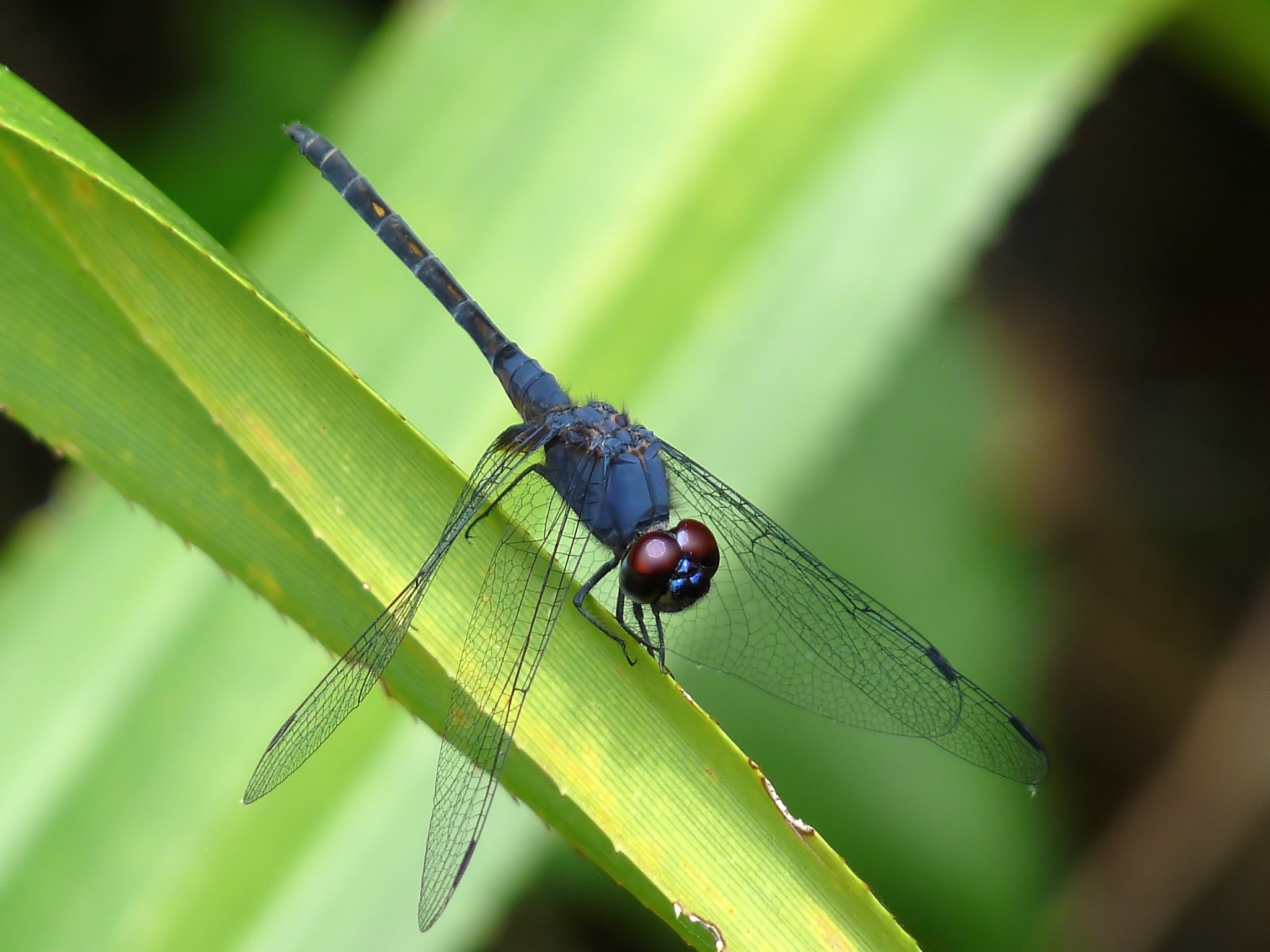
Trithemis festiva male

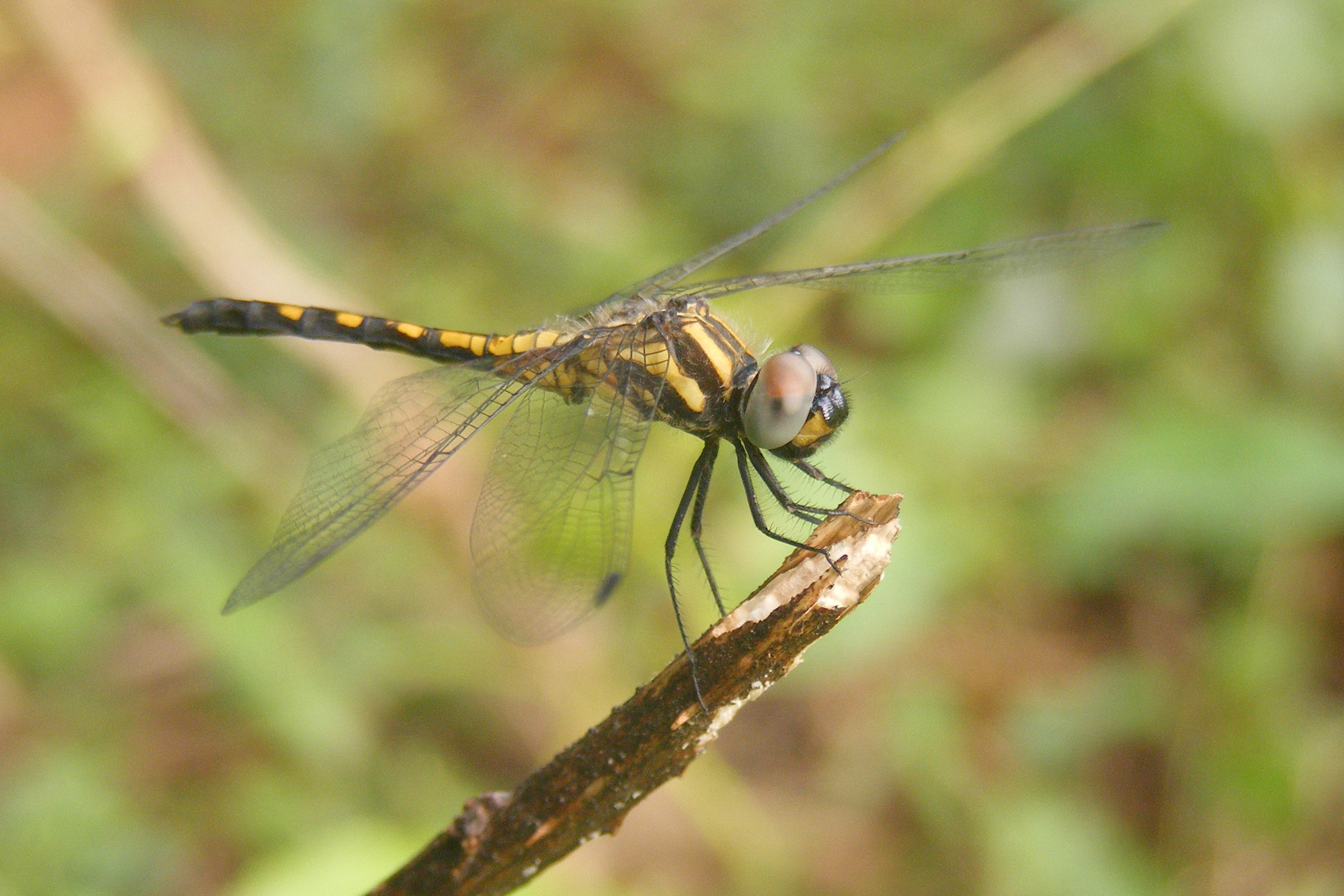
sub-adult male

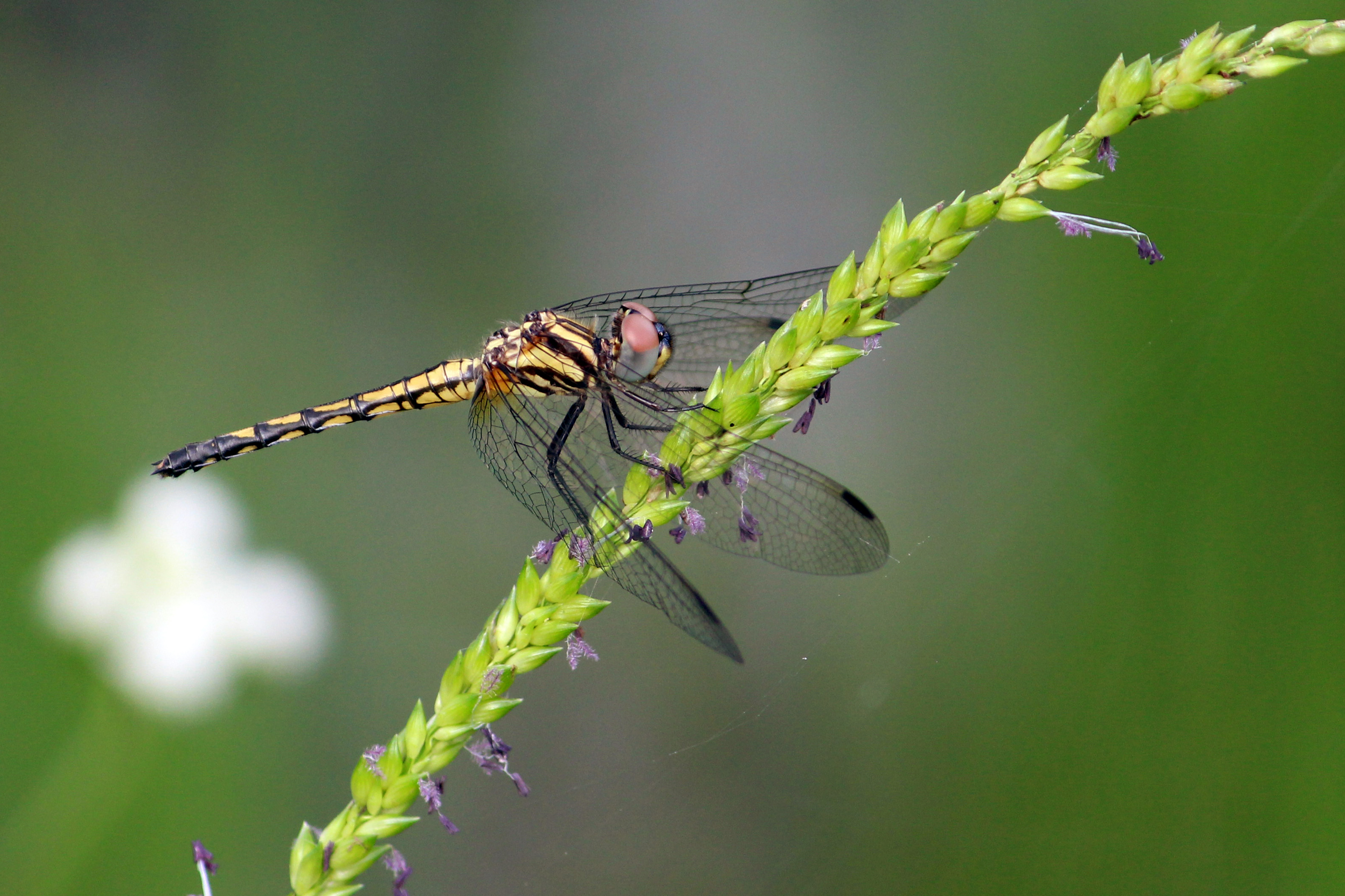
Trithemis festiva female

===== Species: Trithemis kirbyi =====
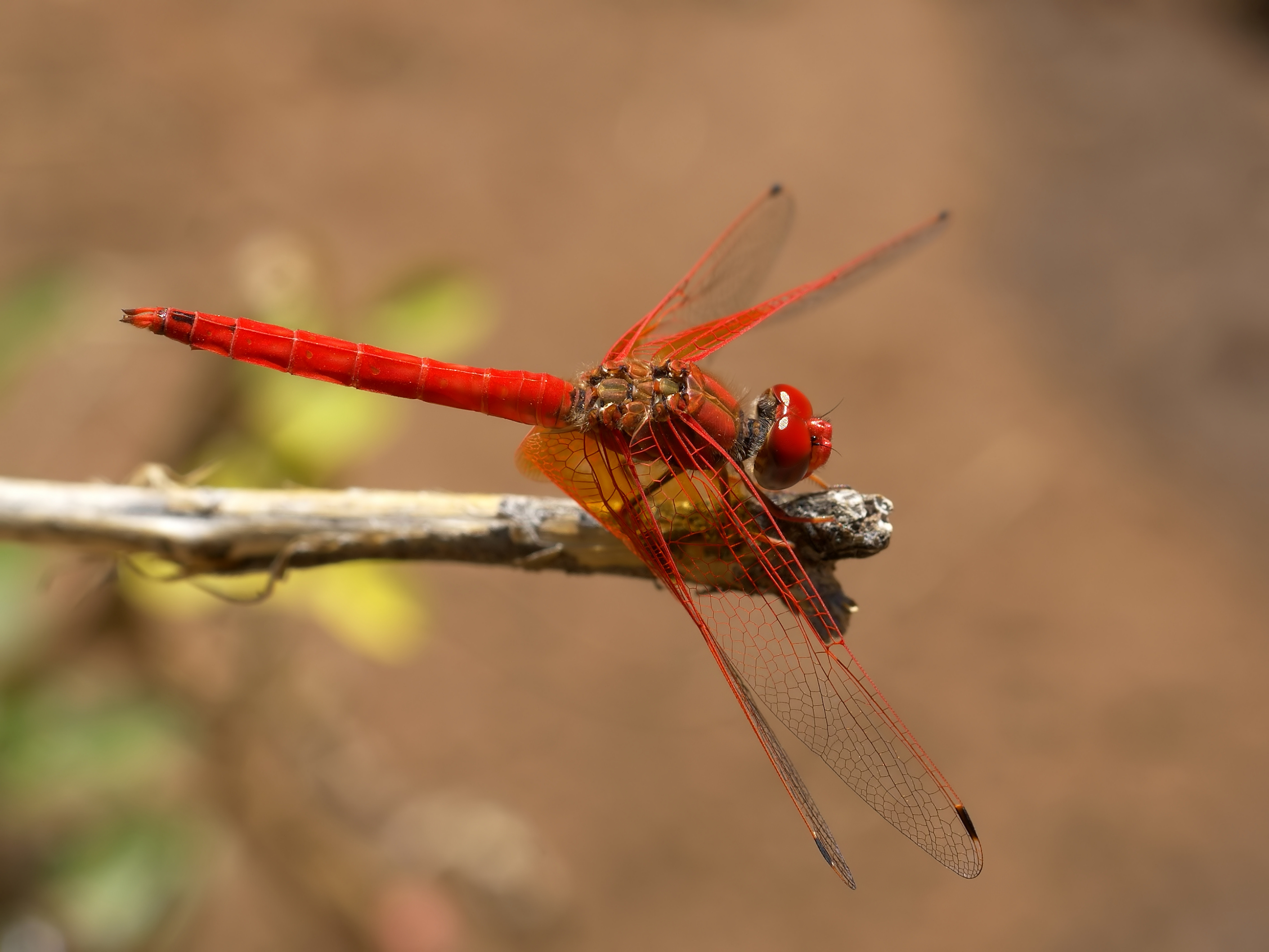
Trithemis kirbyi male

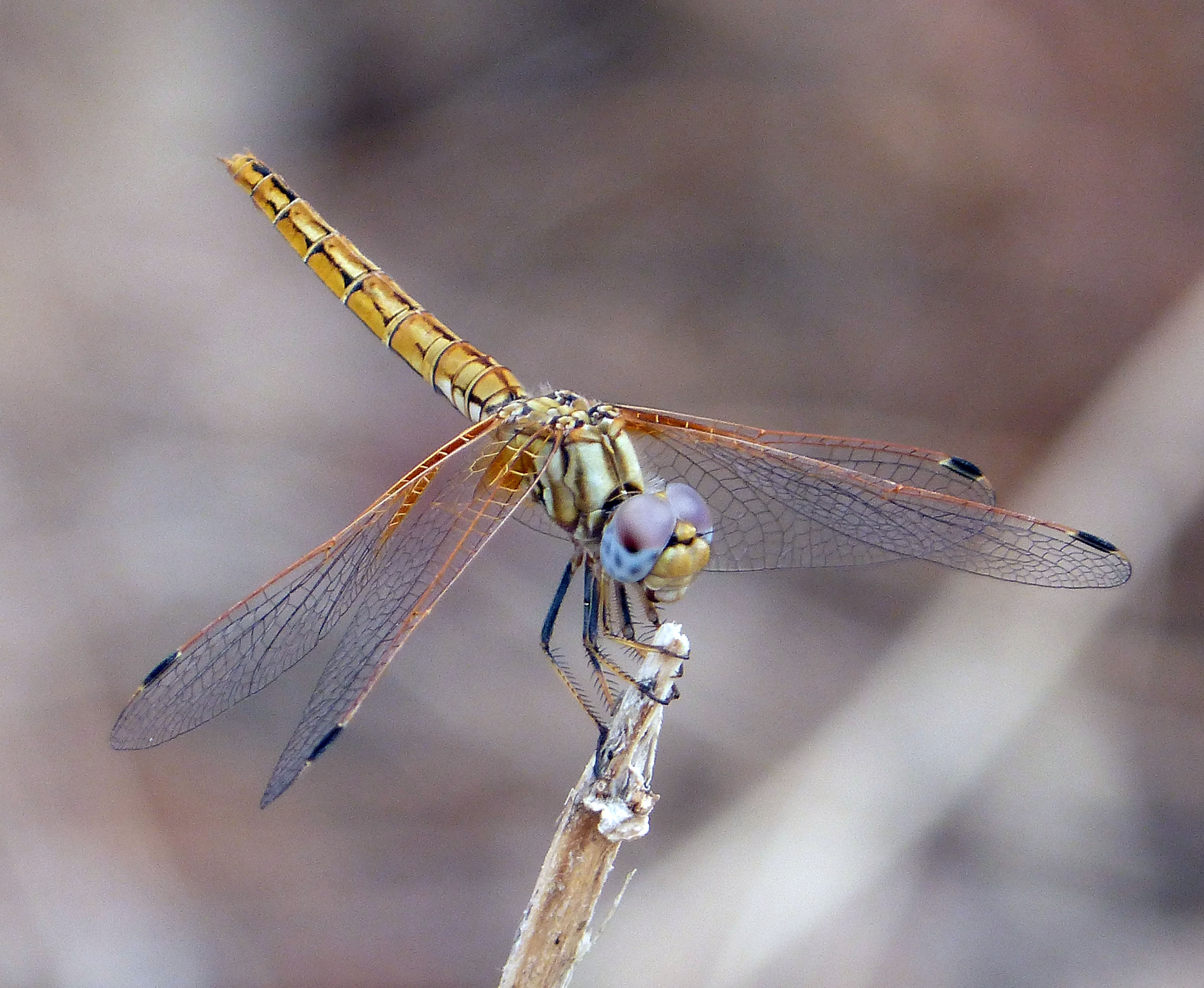
Trithemis kirbyi female

===== Species: Trithemis pallidinervis =====
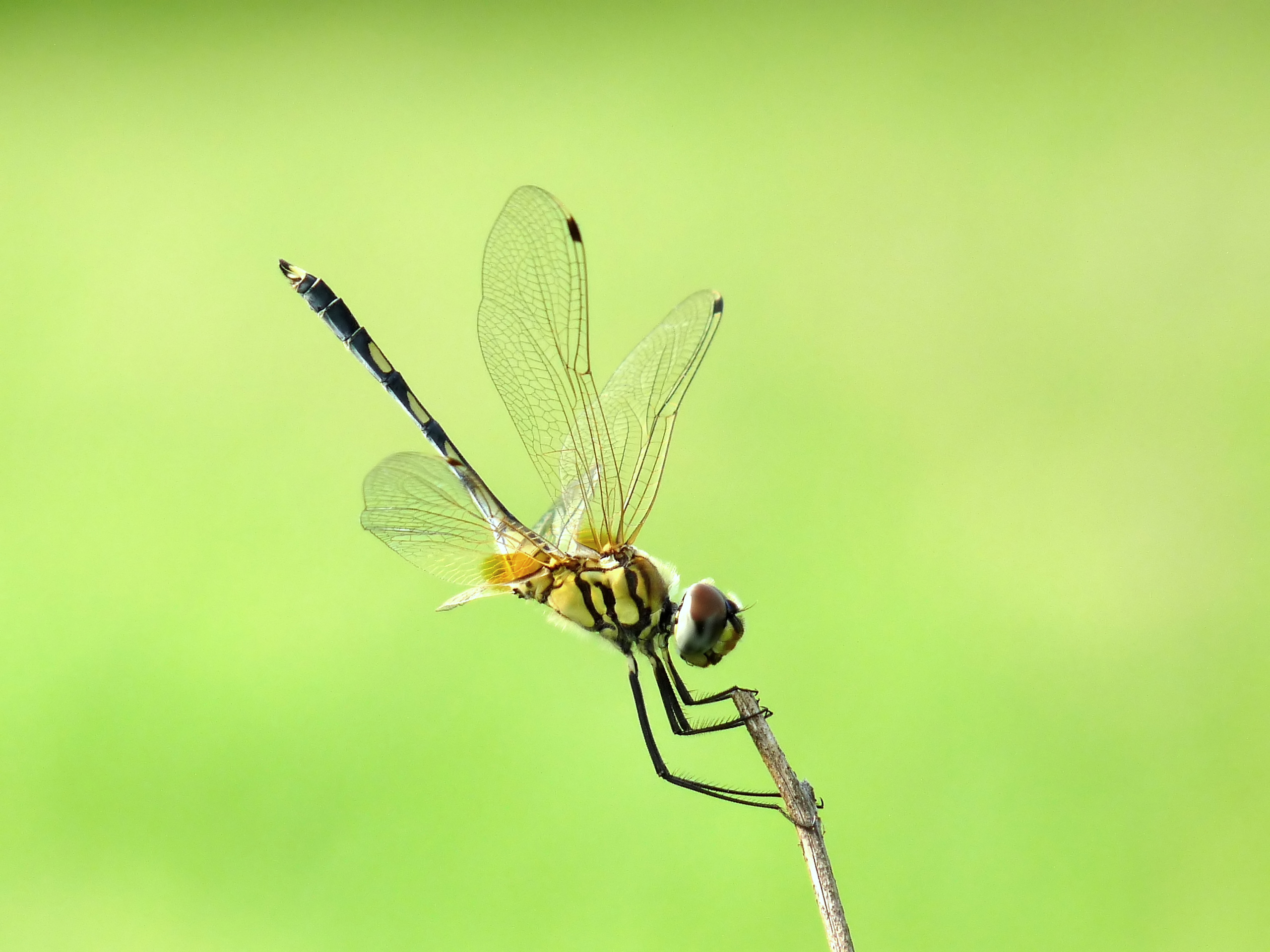
male

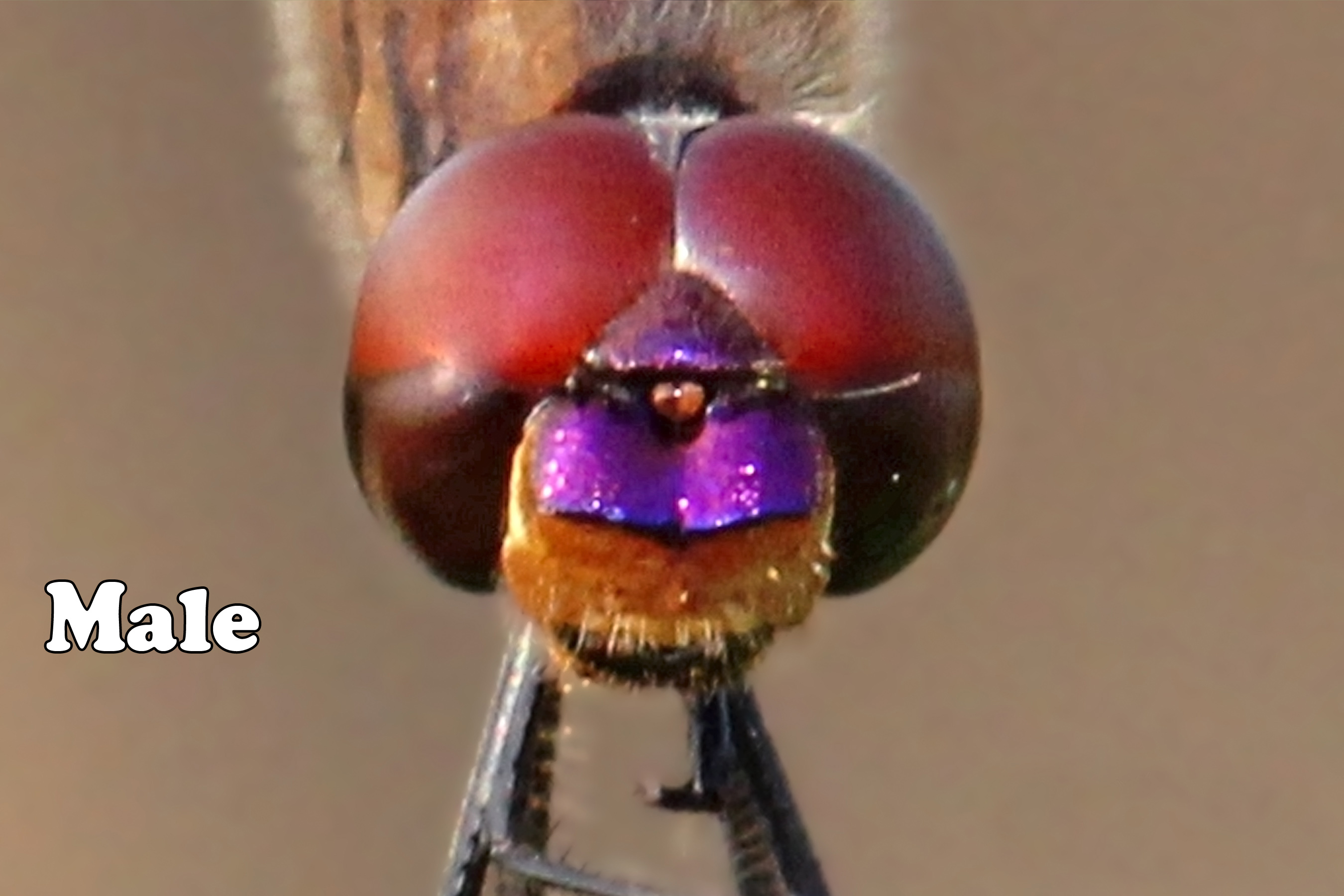
face (male)

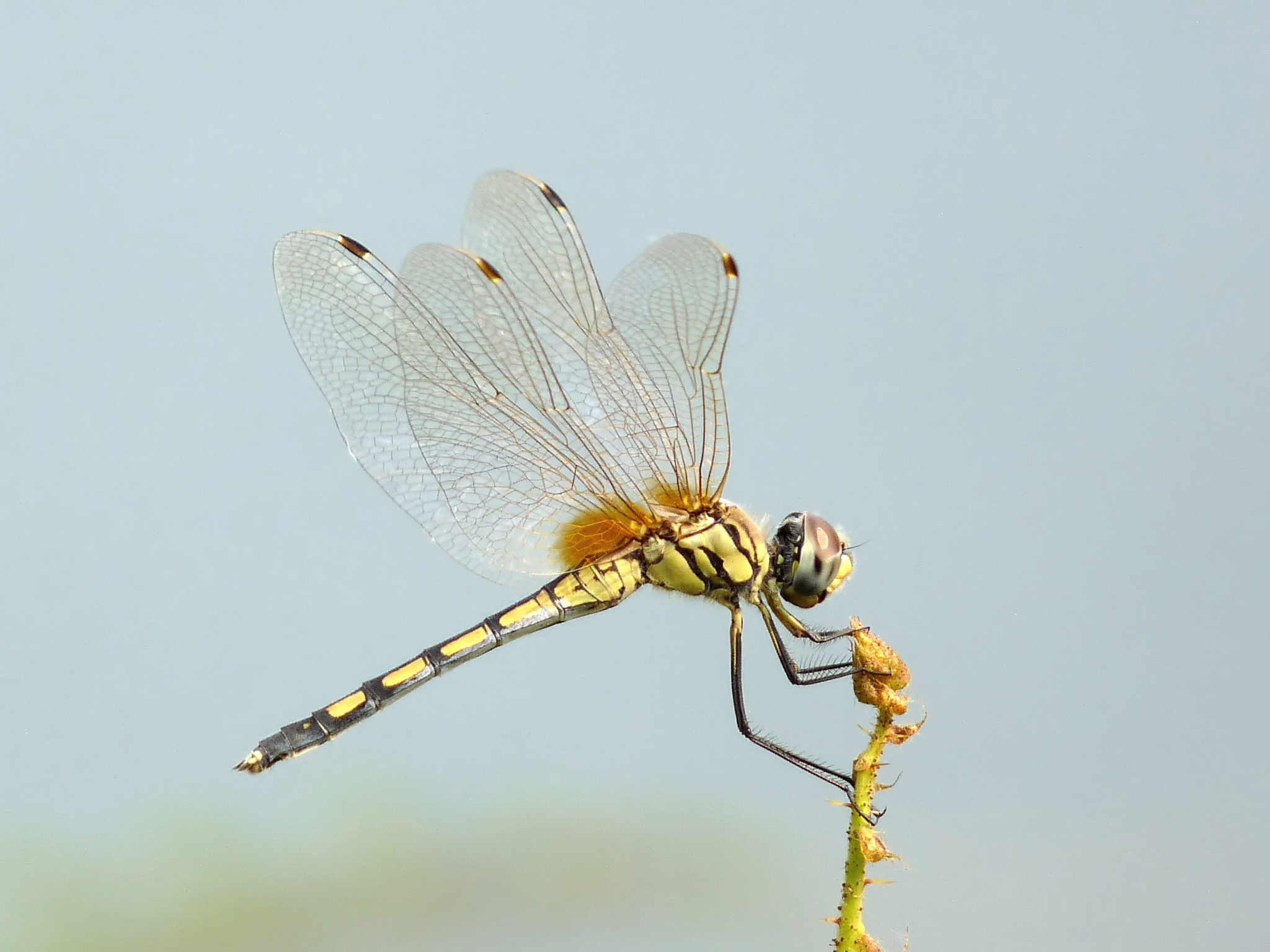
Trithemis pallidinervis female

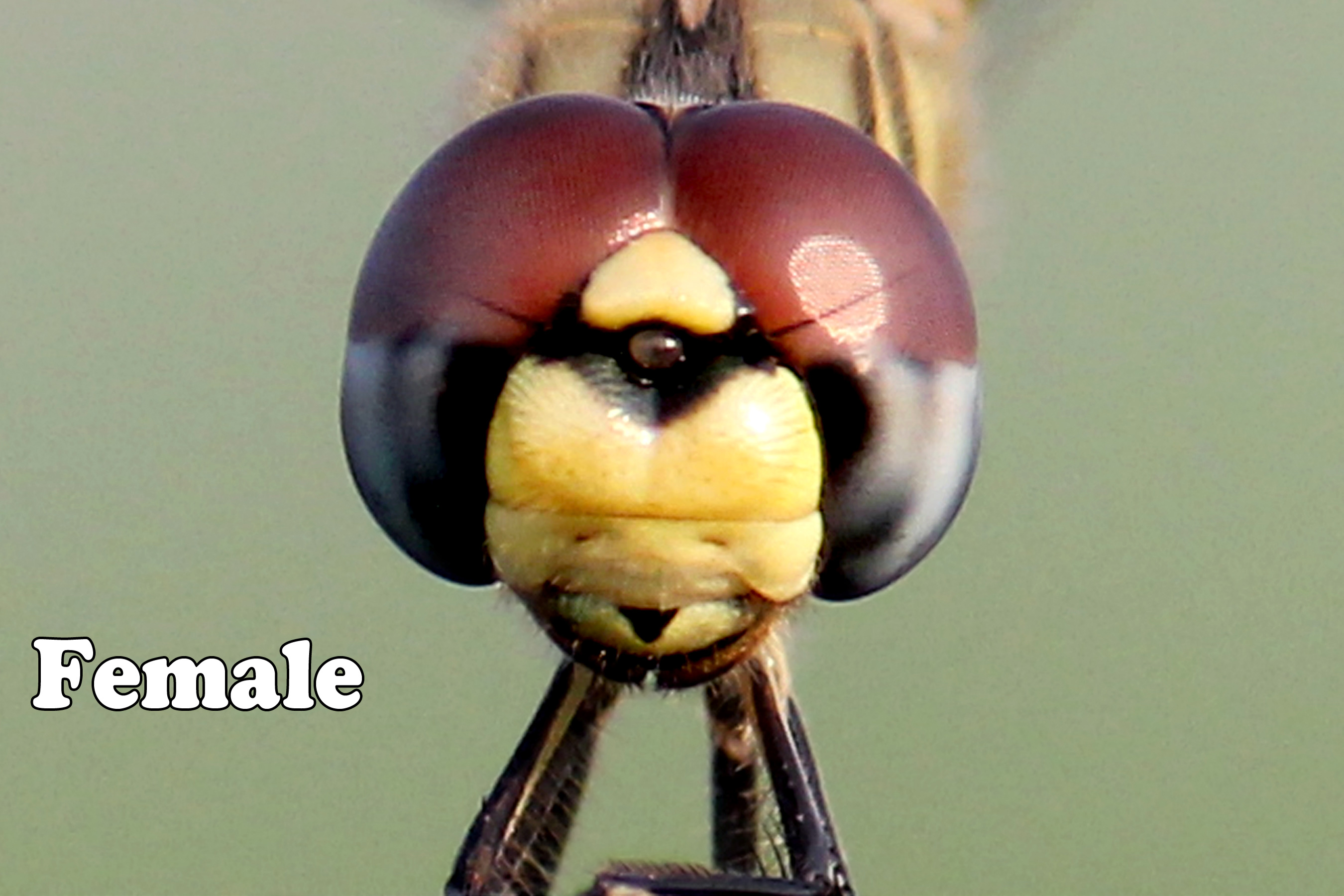
face (female)

==== Genus: Urothemis ====
===== Species: Urothemis signata =====
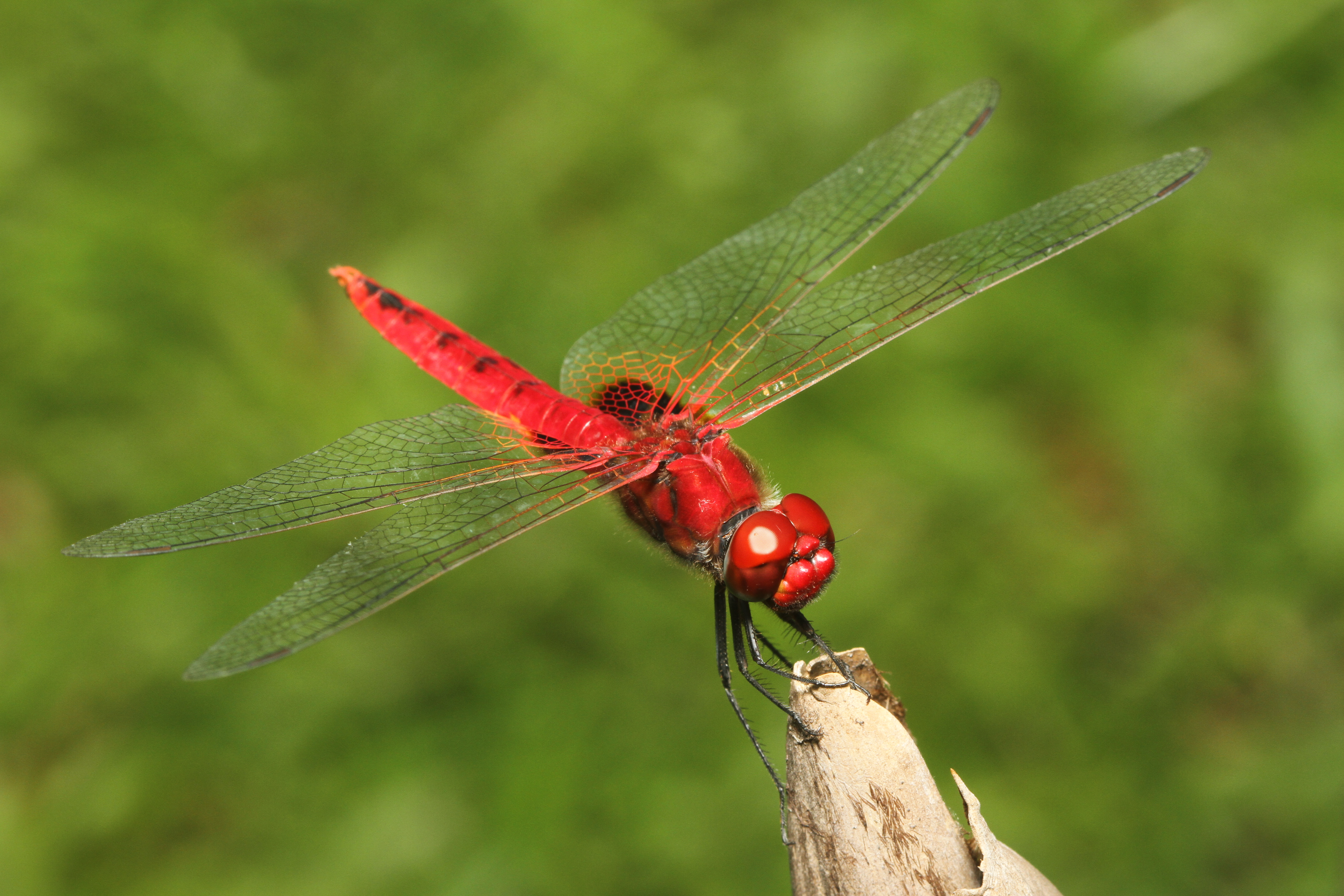
Urothemis signata male

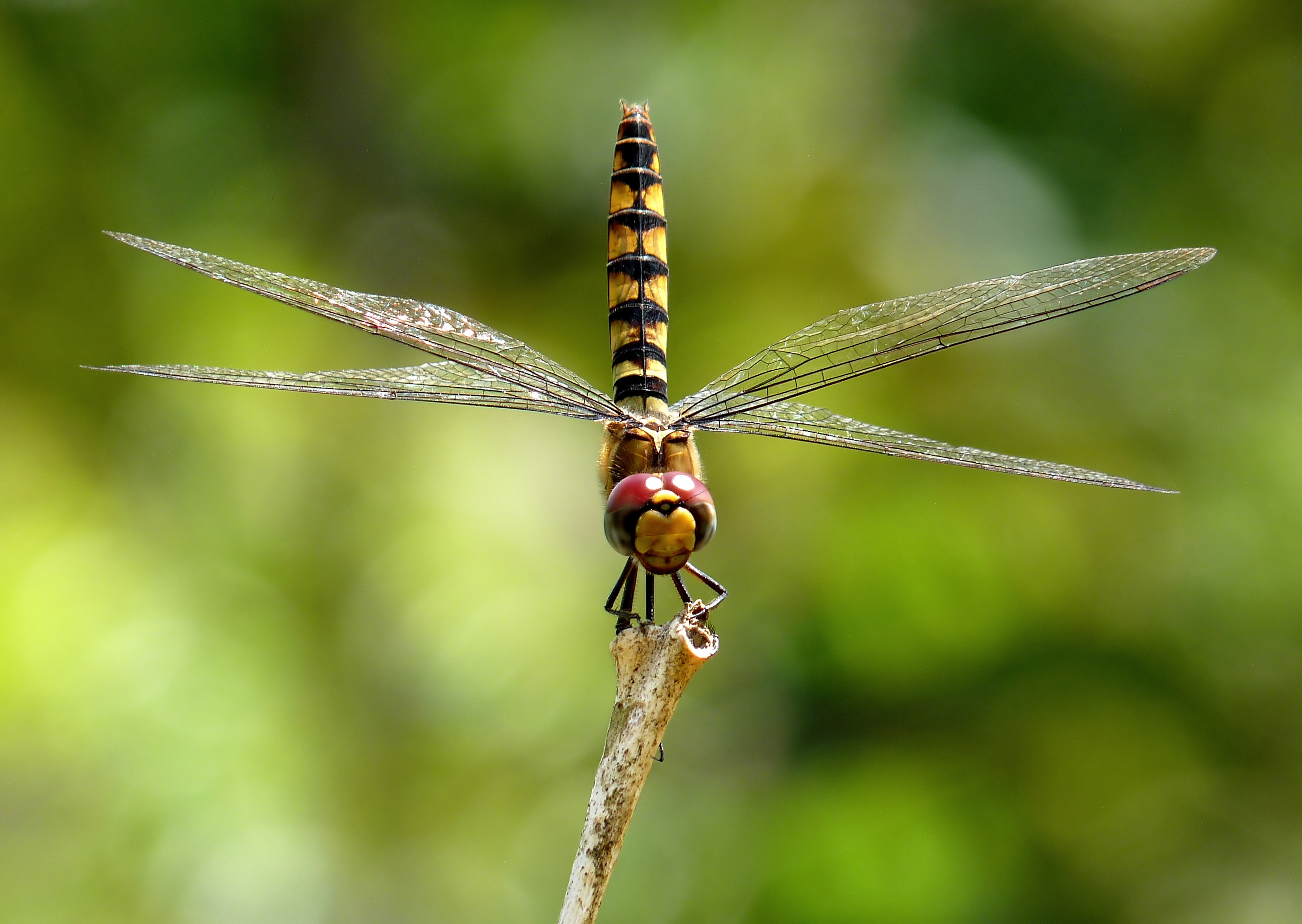
Urothemis signata female

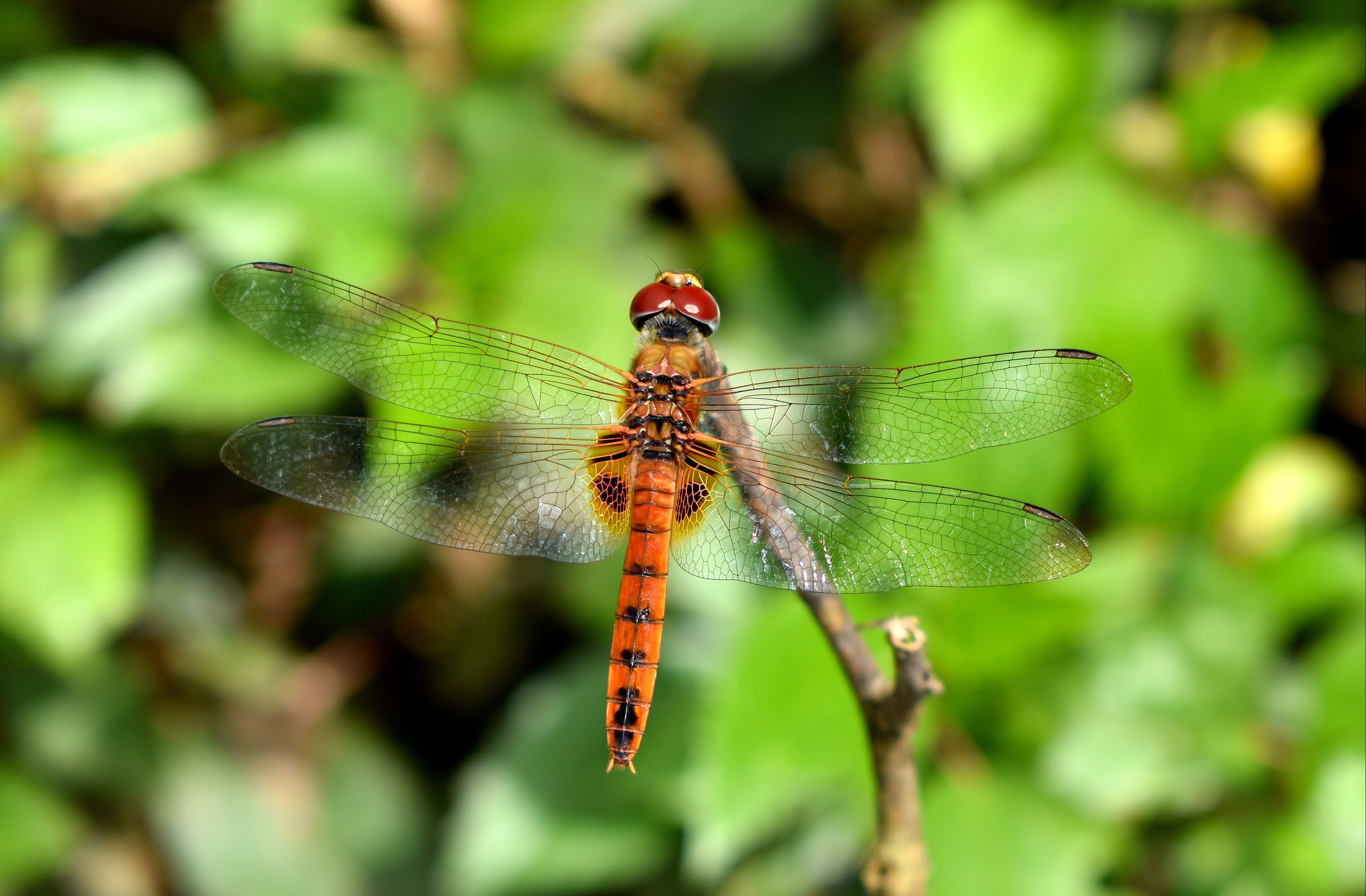
female (andromorph)

==== Genus: Zygonyx ====
===== Species: Zygonyx iris =====
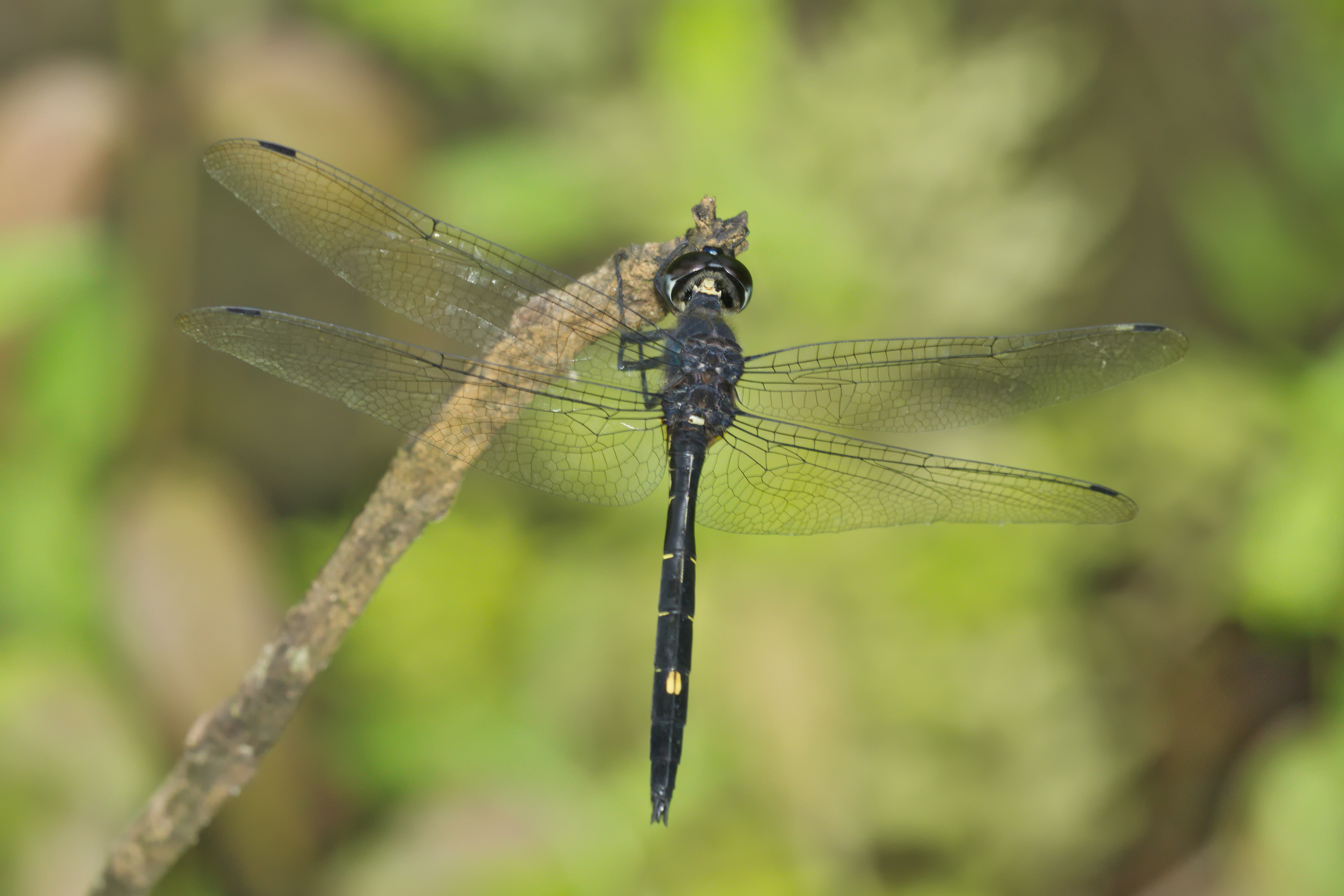
Zygonyx iris male

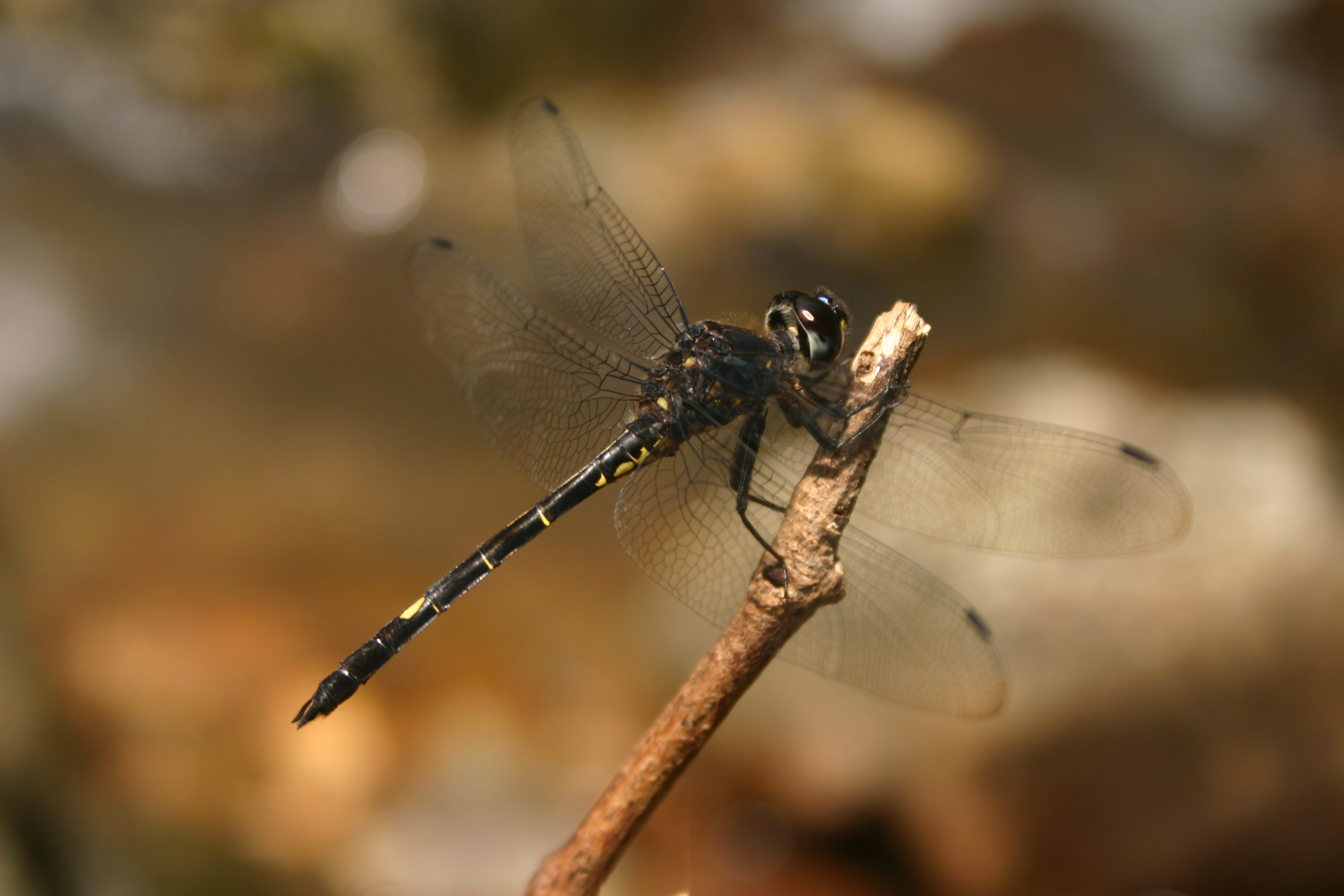
male

==== Genus: Zyxomma ====
===== Species: Zyxomma petiolatum =====
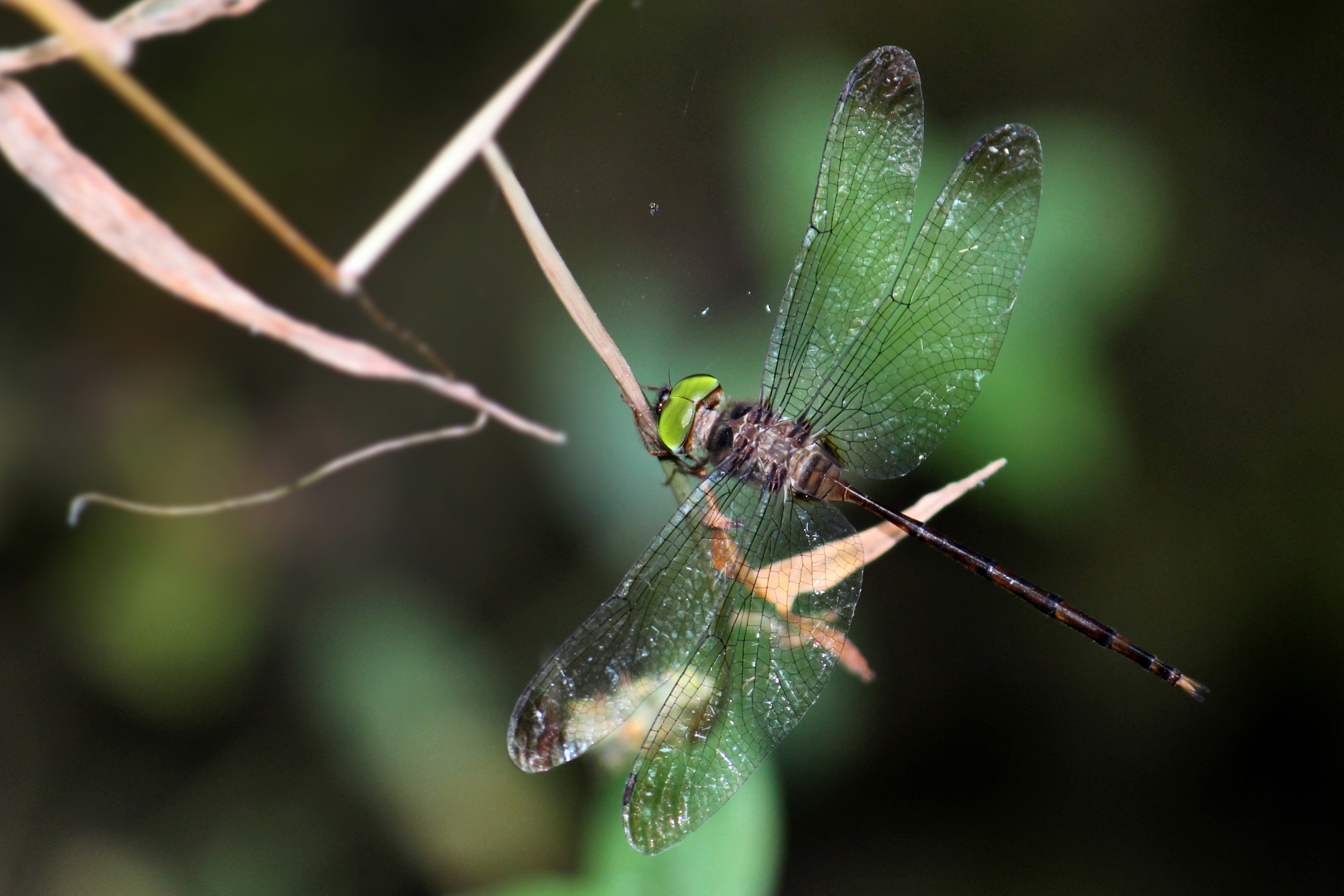
Zyxomma petiolatum male

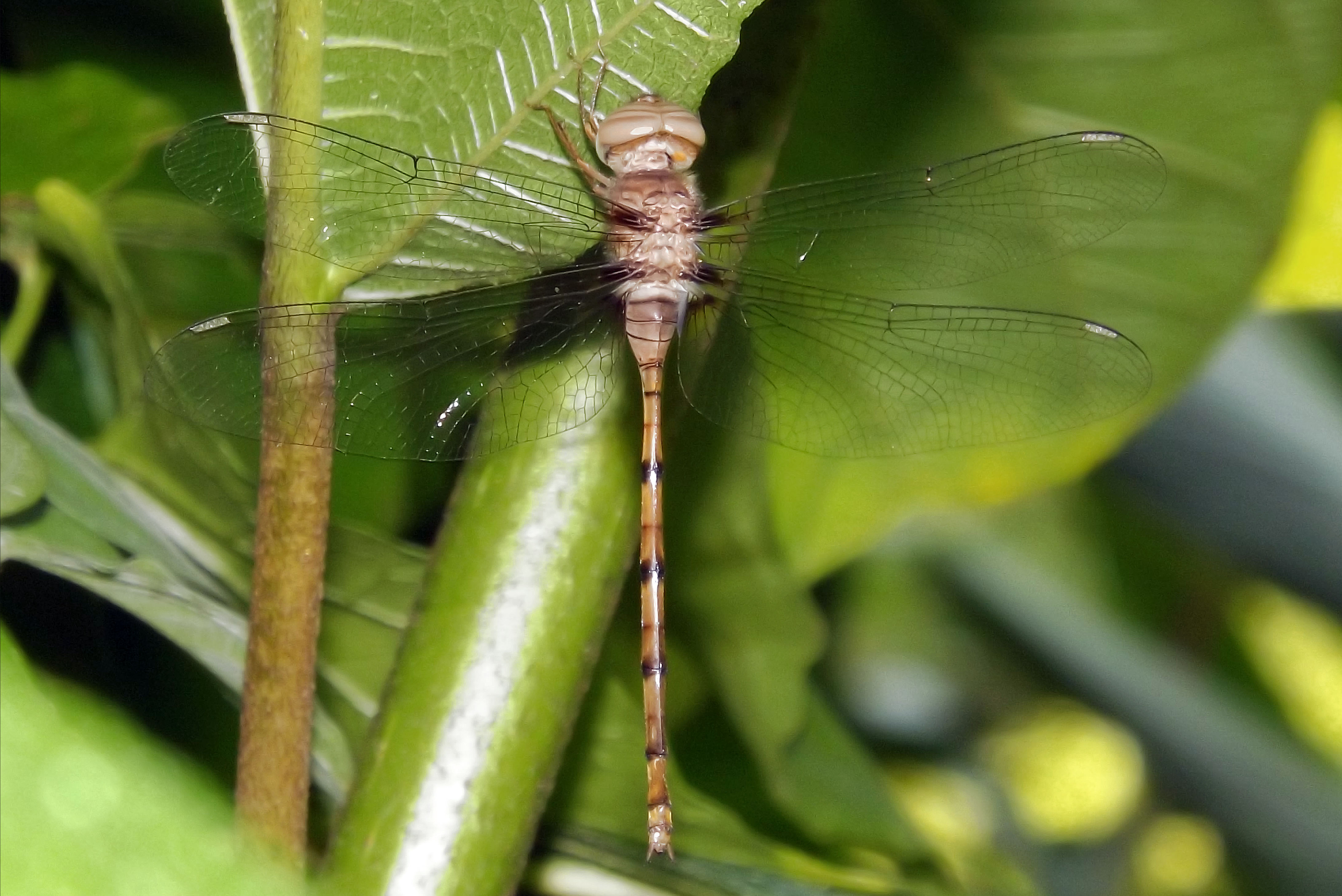
female

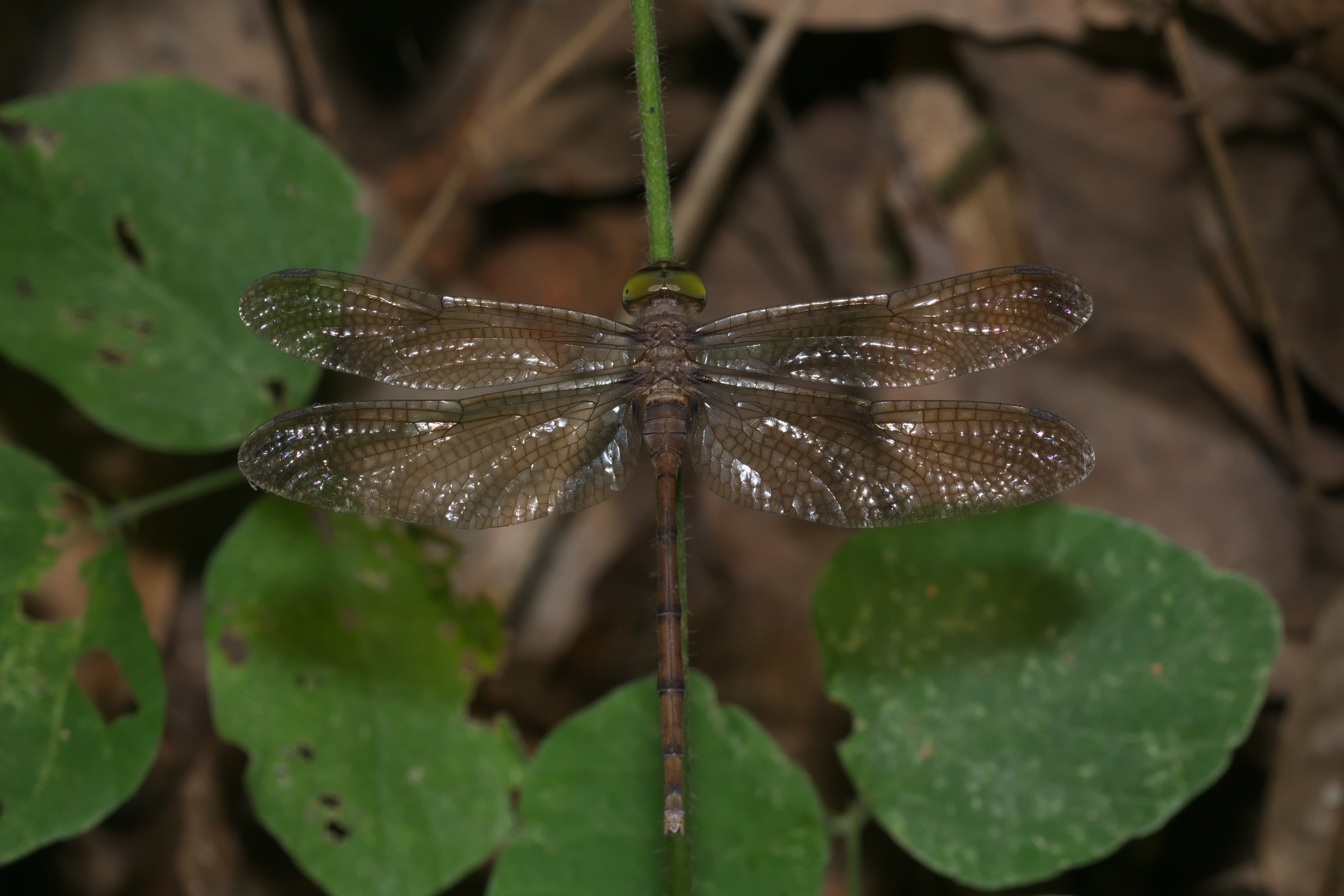
Zyxomma petiolatum female

=== Family: Incertae sedis ===
==== Genus: Idionyx ====
===== Species: Idionyx corona =====
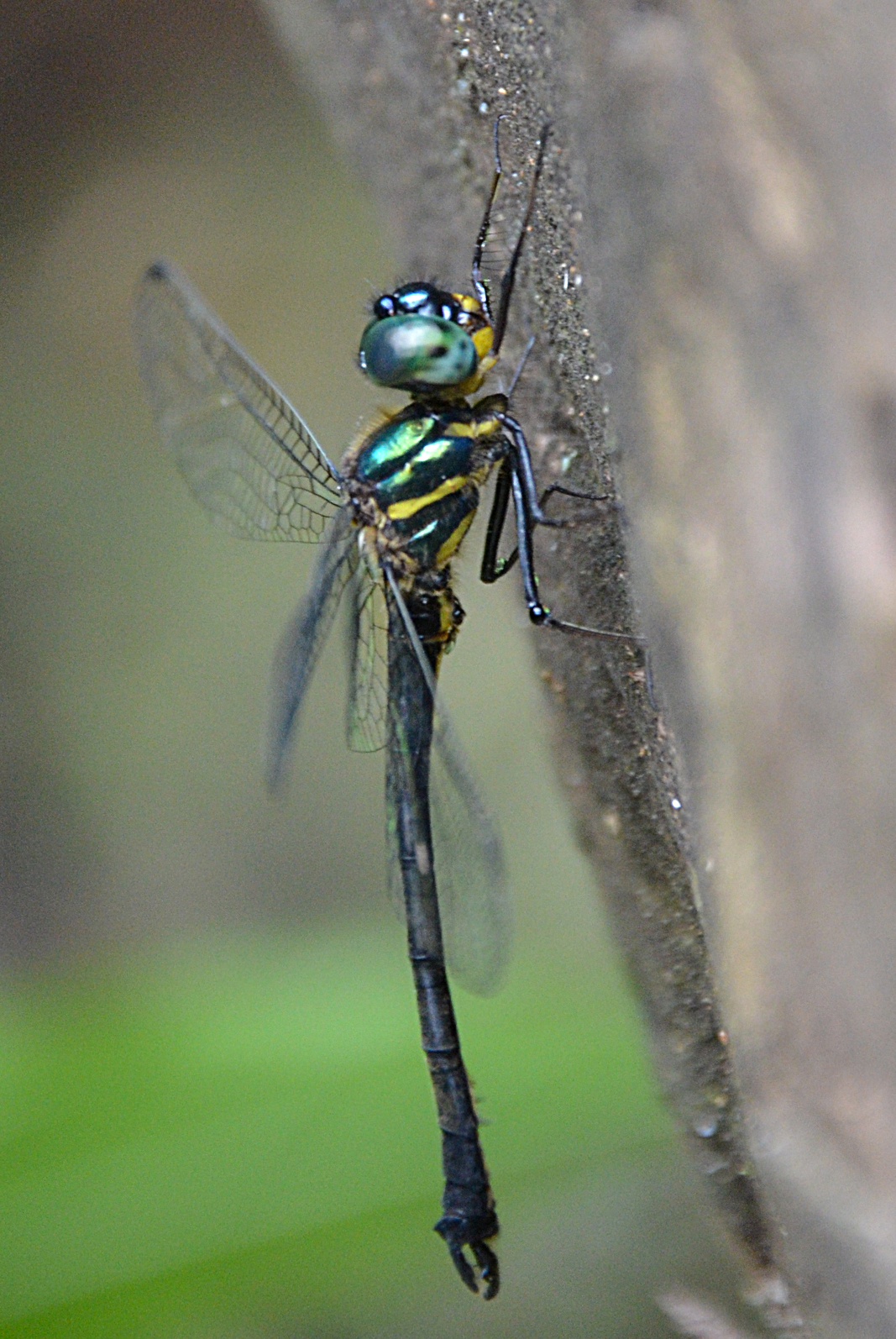
male

===== Species: Idionyx galeatus =====
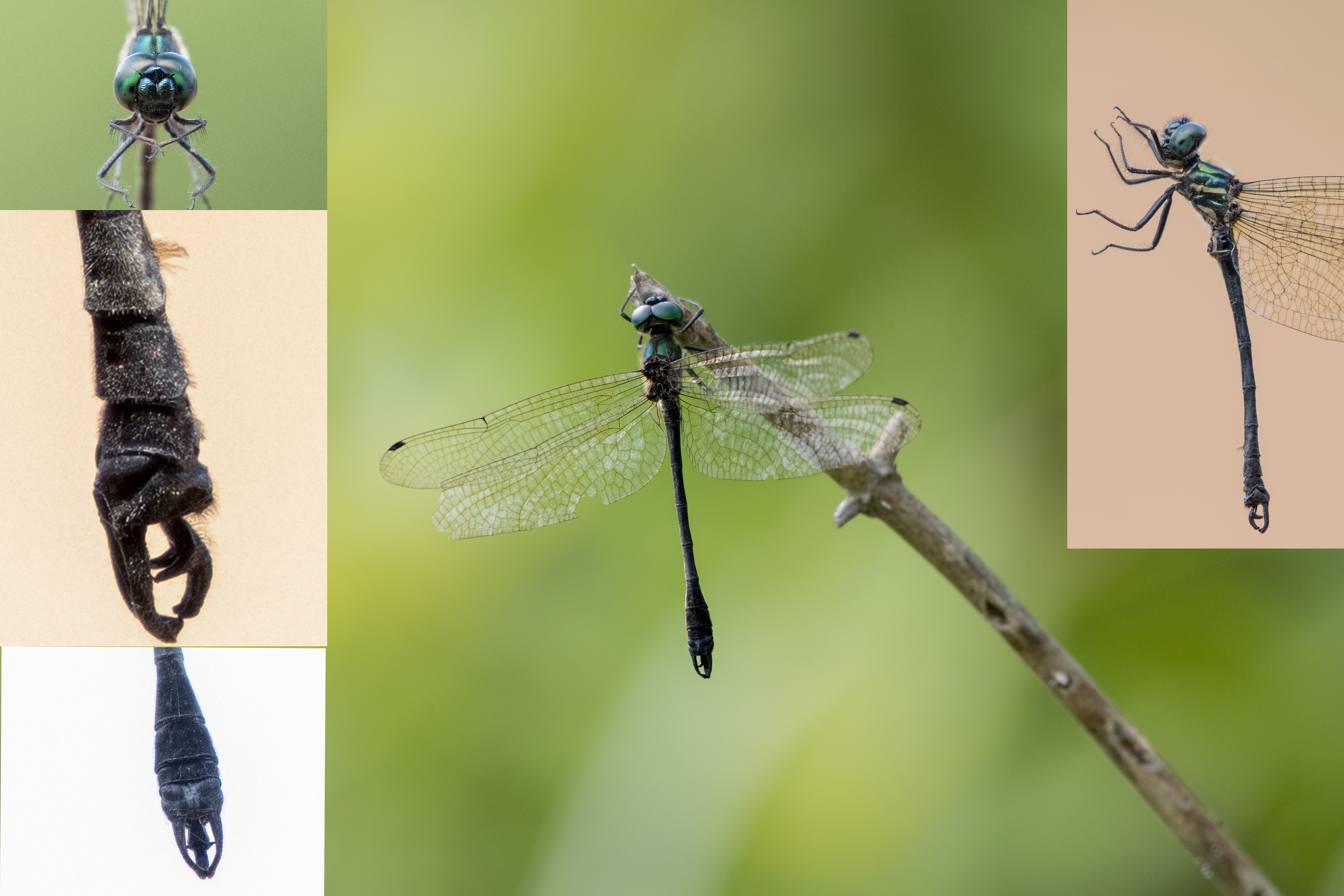
male

===== Species: Idionyx gomantakensis =====
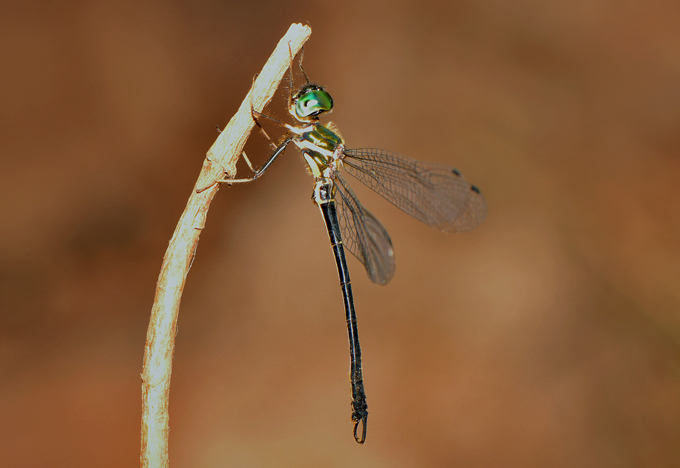
Idionyx gomantakensis male

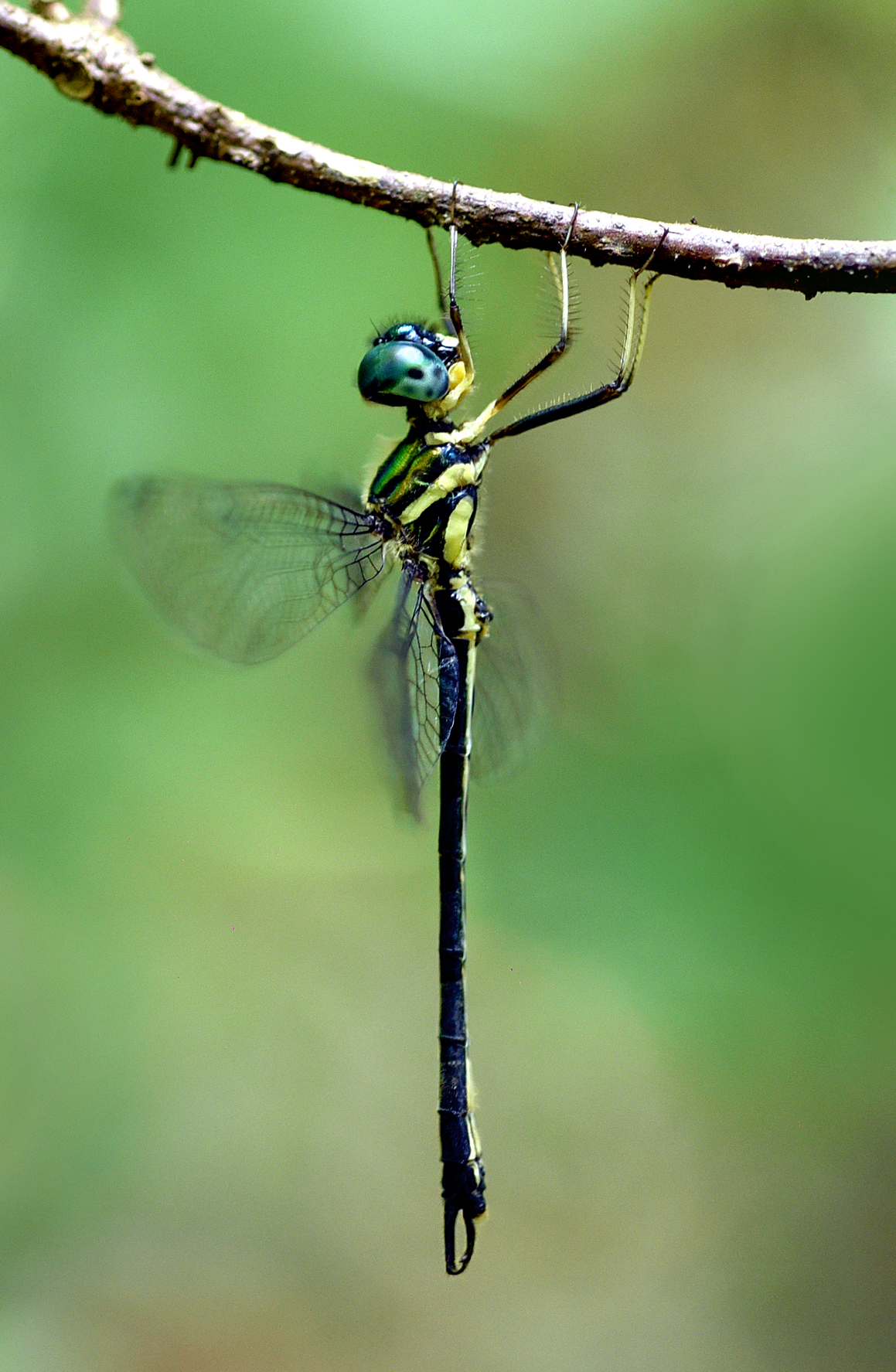
Idionyx gomantakensis male

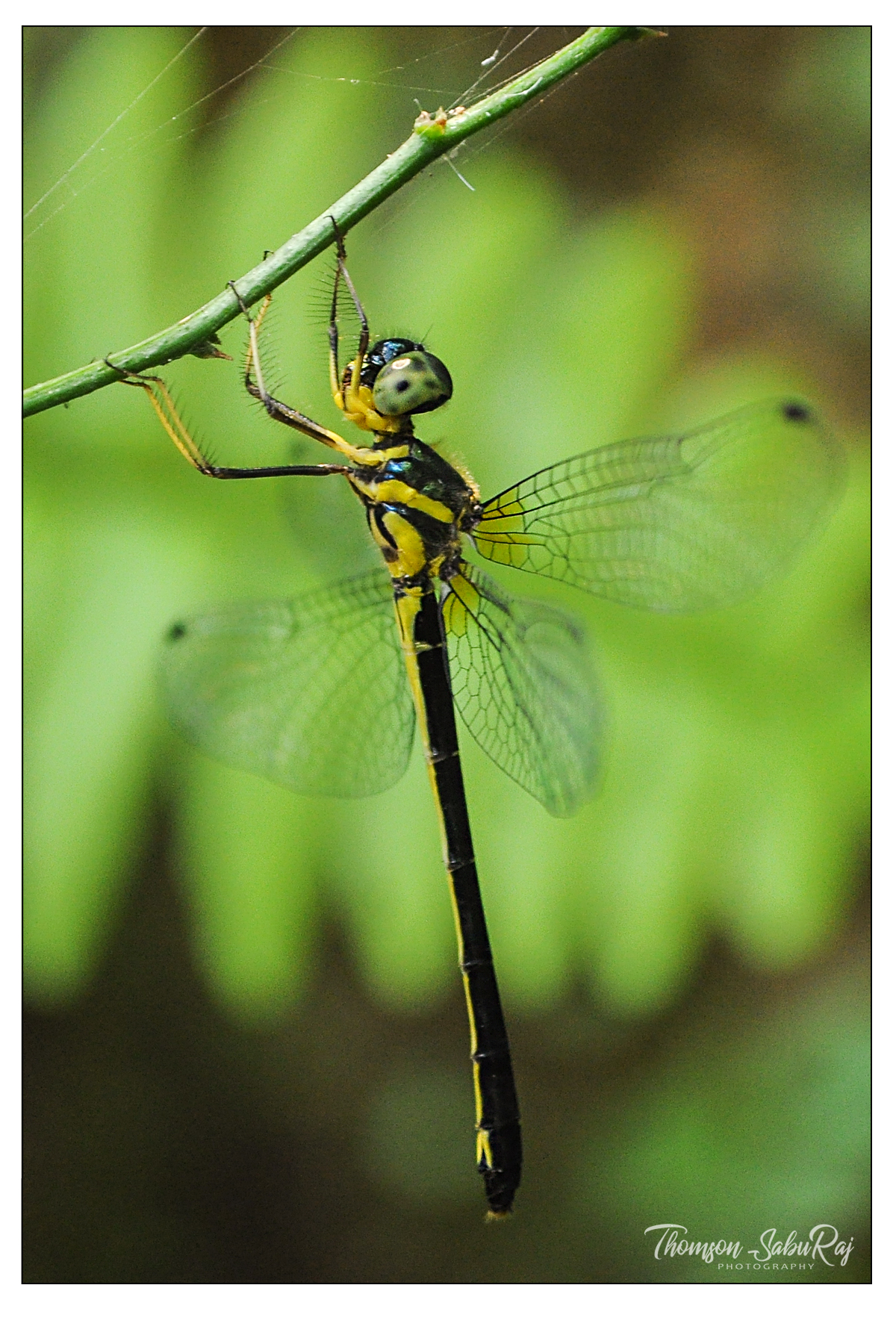
Idionyx gomantakensis female

===== Species: Idionyx saffronatus =====
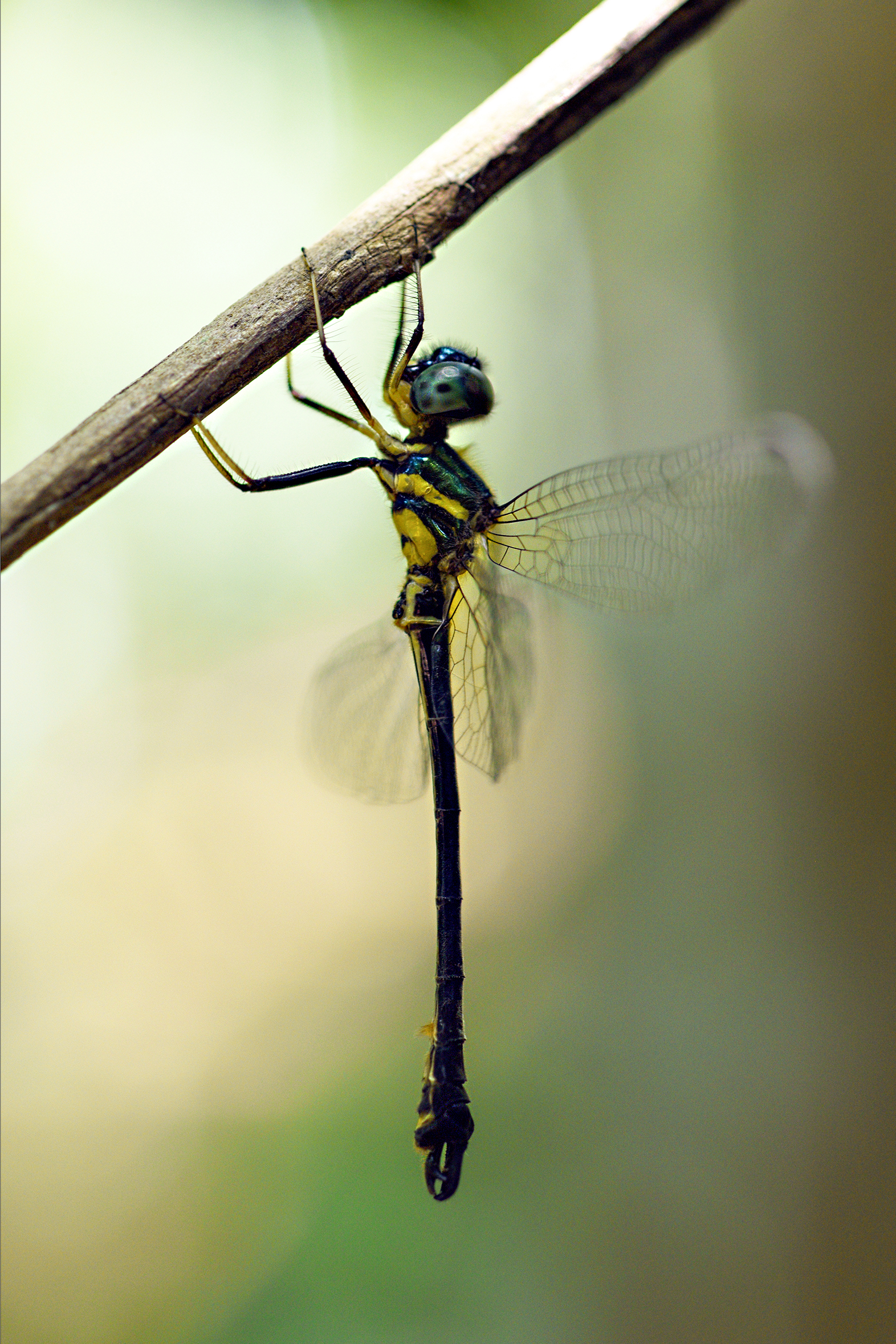
Idionyx saffronatus male

===== Species: Idionyx travancorensis =====
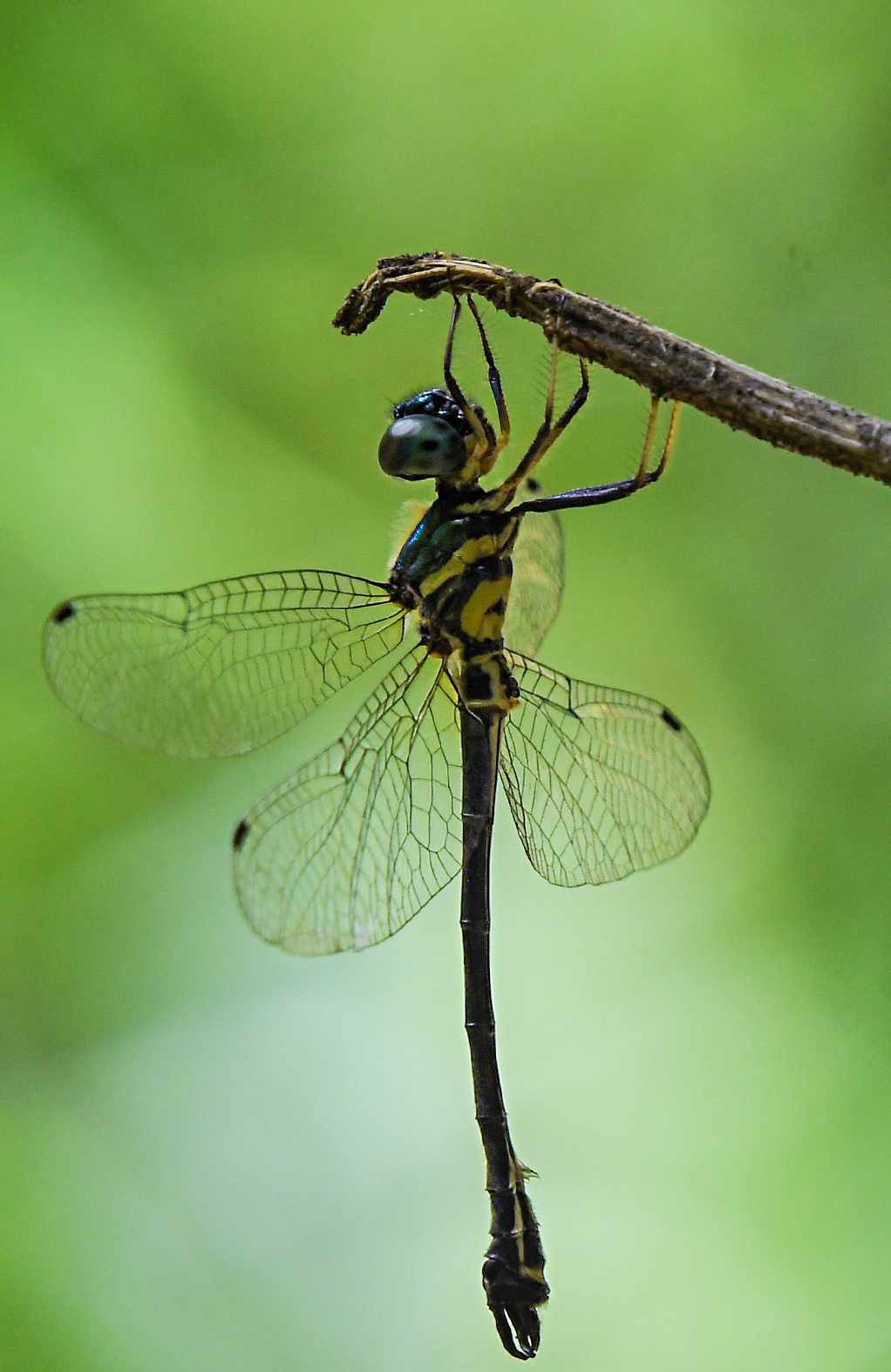
Idionyx travancorensis male

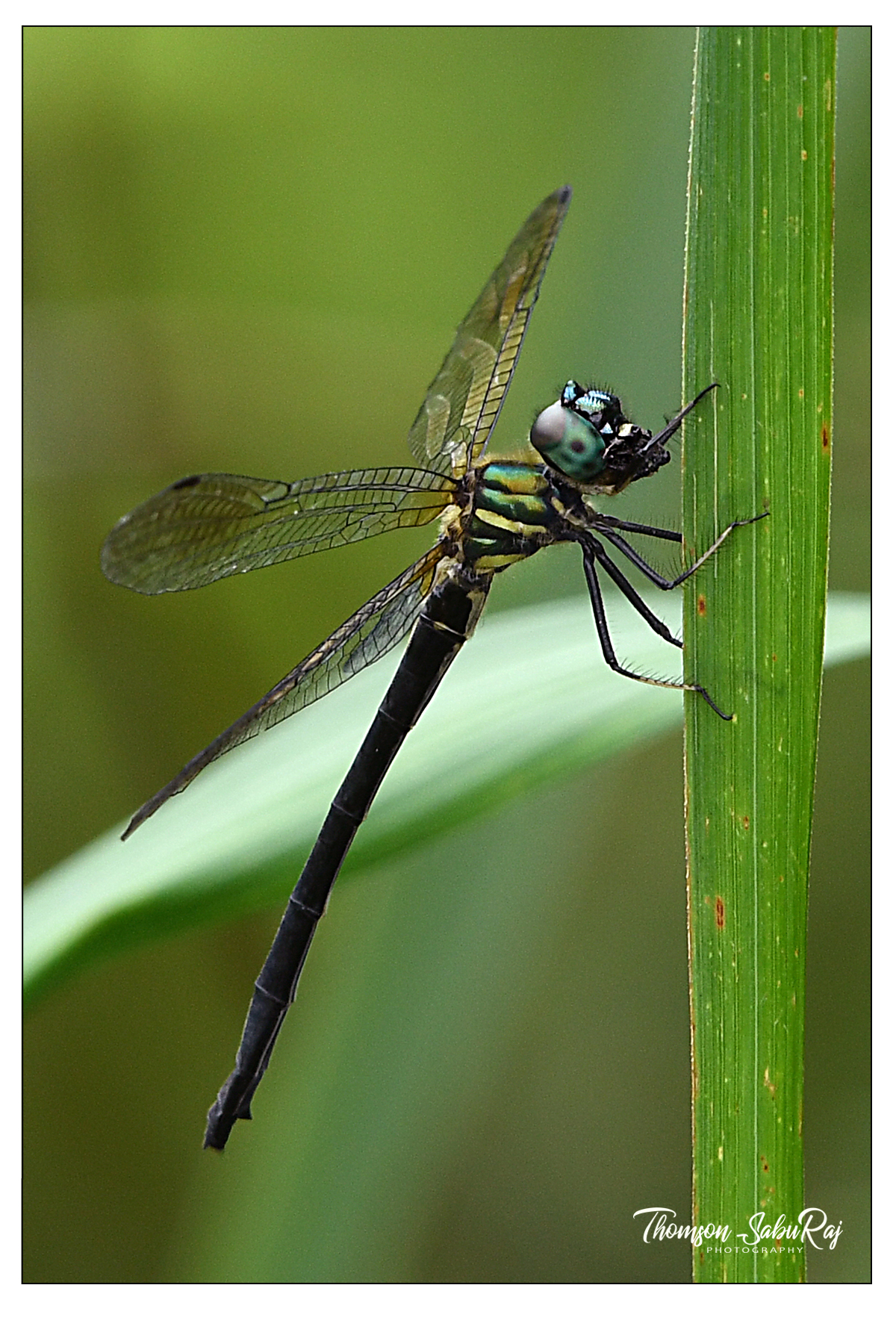
Idionyx travancorensis female

==== Genus: Macromidia ====
===== Species: Macromidia donaldi =====
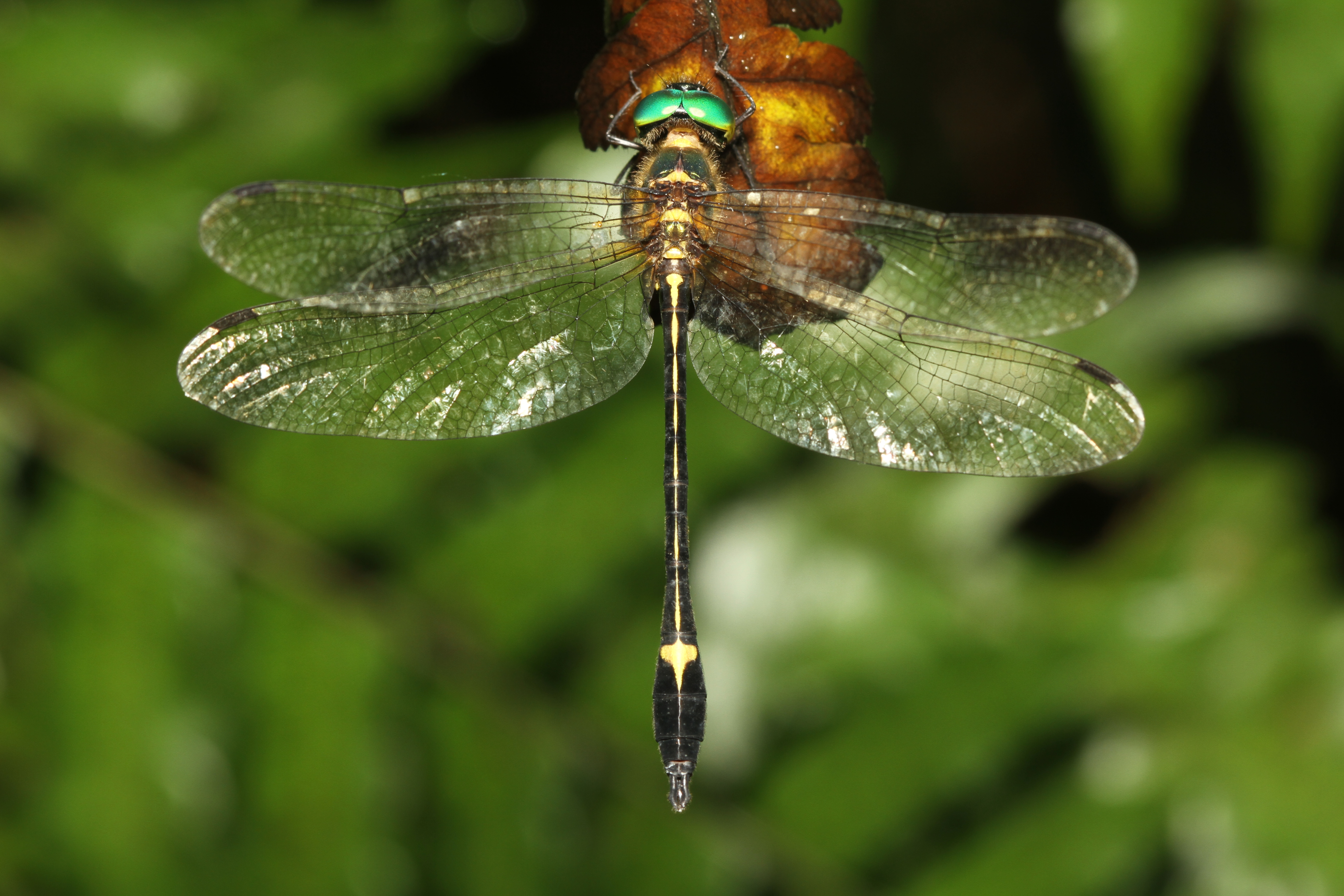
Macromidia donaldi male

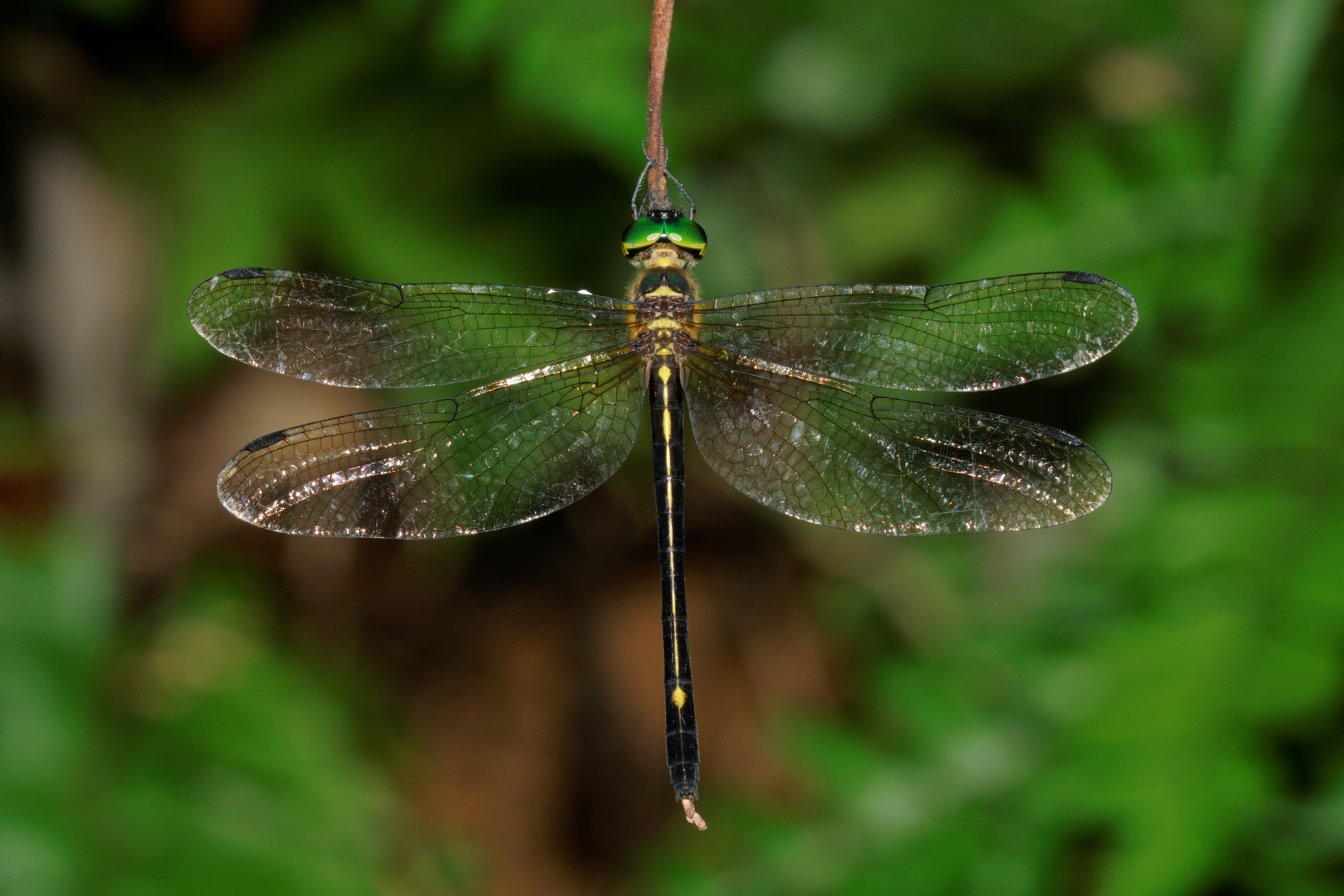
Macromidia donaldi female
