= List of Odonata species of India =

The following is a list of Odonata species of India.

India has extremely diverse terrain, climate and vegetation, which comprises extremes of heat and cold, desert and jungle, of low-lying plains and the highest mountains, of dryness and dampness, islands and continental areas, widely varying flora, and sharply marked seasons. India forms a large part of the Indomalayan biogeographical zone; many of the floral and faunal forms show Malayan affinities with some taxa being unique to the Indian region. In addition, India hosts three of the world's biodiversity hotspots: the Western Ghats, the Himalayas, and the hilly ranges bordering India and Myanmar, each having numerous endemic species.

India is home to 532 species of dragonflies and damselflies. The majority of the Odonata in India are found in the rainforests of the Western Ghats and Northeast India.

198 species of Odonata are endemic to India. These endemic species are marked with (E).

== Lestidae ==
- Indolestes assamicus Fraser, 1930 (E)
- Indolestes cyaneus (Selys, 1862)
- Indolestes gracilis (Hagen in Selys, 1862)
- Indolestes indicus Fraser, 1922 (E)
- Indolestes pulcherrimus Fraser, 1924 (E)
- Lestes barbarus (Fabricius, 1798)
- Lestes concinnus Hagen in Selys, 1862
- Lestes dorothea Fraser, 1924
- Lestes elatus Hagen in Selys, 1862
- Lestes garoensis Lahiri, 1987 (E)
- Lestes malabaricus Fraser, 1929
- Lestes nigriceps Fraser, 1924
- Lestes nodalis Selys, 1891
- Lestes paloti Nair, George, Samuel & Sadasivan, 2026 (E)
- Lestes patricia Fraser, 1924
- Lestes praemorsus Hagen in Selys, 1862
- Lestes viridulus Rambur, 1842
- Orolestes durga Lahiri, 1987 (E)
- Orolestes selysi McLachlan, 1895
- Platylestes kirani Emiliyamma, Jafer & Charesh, 2020 (E)
- Platylestes platystylus Rambur, 1842
- Sympecma paedisca (Brauer, 1877)

== Synlestidae ==
- Megalestes gyalsey Gyeltshen, Kalkman & Orr, 2017
- Megalestes irma Fraser, 1926
- Megalestes kurahashii Asahina, 1985
- Megalestes lieftincki Lahiri, 1979 (E)
- Megalestes major Selys, 1862
- Megalestes micans Needham, 1930

== Platystictidae ==
- Drepanosticta annandalei Fraser, 1924 (E)
- Drepanosticta carmichaeli (Laidlaw, 1915)
- Drepanosticta polychromatica Fraser, 1931
- Indosticta deccanensis (Laidlaw, 1915) (E)
- Protosticta anamalaica Sadasivan, Nair & Samuel, 2022 (E)
- Protosticta armageddonia Chandran, Payra, Deshpande & Koparde, 2023
- Protosticta antelopoides Fraser, 1931 (E)
- Protosticta cyanofemora Joshi, Subramanian, Babu & Kunte, 2020 (E)
- Protosticta damacornu Terzani & Carletti, 1998 (E)
- Protosticta davenporti Fraser, 1931 (E)
- Protosticta francyi Sadasivan, Vibhu, Nair & Palot, 2022 (E)
- Protosticta fraseri Kennedy, 1936 (E)
- Protosticta gravelyi Laidlaw, 1915 (E)
- Protosticta hearseyi Fraser, 1922 (E)
- Protosticta himalaica Laidlaw, 1917
- Protosticta khasia Joshi & Sarkar, 2024 (E)
- Protosticta monticola Emiliyamma & Palot, 2016 (E)
- Protosticta mortoni Fraser, 1924 (E)
- Protosticta myristicaensis Joshi & Kunte, 2020 (E)
- Protosticta ponmudiensis Kiran, Kalesh & Kunte, 2015 (E)
- Protosticta rufostigma Kimmins, 1958 (E)
- Protosticta sanguinostigma Fraser, 1922 (E)
- Protosticta samtsensis Gurung & Phan, 2023
- Protosticta sexcolorata Chandran, Muneer, Madhavan & Jose, 2024 (E)
- Protosticta sholai Subramanian & Babu, 2020 (E)
- Protosticta sooryaprakashi Haneef, Chandran, Sawant, Beevi & Kunte, 2025 (E)
- Yunnanosticta siangi Joshi, Sawant & Kunte, 2024 (E)

== Calopterygidae ==
- Caliphaea confusa Hagen in Selys, 1859
- Caliphaea sinuofurcata Sawant, Joshi & Kunte, 2025 (E)
- Echo margarita Selys, 1853
- Echo perornata Yu & Hämäläinen, 2012
- Matrona nigripectus Selys, 1879
- Neurobasis chinensis (Linnaeus, 1758)
- Vestalaria smaragdina (Selys, 1879)
- Vestalis apicalis Selys, 1873
- Vestalis gracilis (Rambur, 1842)
- Vestalis submontana Fraser, 1934 (E)

== Chlorocyphidae ==
- Aristocypha cuneata (Selys, 1853)
- Aristocypha fenestrella Rambur, 1842
- Aristocypha hilaryae Fraser, 1927
- Aristocypha immaculata Selys, 1879
- Aristocypha quadrimaculata Selys, 1853
- Aristocypha spuria (Selys, 1879)
- Aristocypha trifasciata Selys, 1853
- Calocypha laidlawi (Fraser, 1924) (E)
- Heliocypha biforata (Selys, 1859)
- Heliocypha bisignata (Hagen in Selys, 1853) (E)
- Heliocypha perforata (Percheron, 1835)
- Heterocypha vitrinella (Fraser, 1935)
- Indocypha vittata (Selys, 1891)
- Libellago andamanensis (Fraser, 1924) (E)
- Libellago aurantiaca (Selys, 1959)
- Libellago balus Hämäläinen, 2002 (E)
- Libellago blanda (Hagen in Selys, 1853) (E)
- Libellago indica (Fraser, 1928) (E)
- Libellago lineata (Burmeister, 1839)
- Paracypha unimaculata (Selys, 1853)
- Rhinocypha ignipennis Selys, 1879
- Rhinocypha trimaculata Selys, 1853

== Devadattidae ==
- Devadatta adii Joshi, Sawant & Kunte, 2024 (E)

== Euphaeidae ==
- Anisopleura comes Hagen, 1880
- Anisopleura lestoides Selys, 1853
- Anisopleura subplatystyla Fraser, 1927
- Anisopleura vallei St. Quentin, 1937 (E)
- Bayadera hyalina Selys, 1879
- Bayadera indica (Selys, 1853)
- Bayadera kali Cowley, 1936 (E)
- Bayadera longicauda Fraser, 1928
- Dysphaea ethela Fraser, 1924 (E)
- Dysphaea gloriosa Fraser, 1938
- Euphaea cardinalis (Fraser, 1924) (E)
- Euphaea dispar Rambur, 1842 (E)
- Euphaea fraseri (Laidlaw, 1920) (E)
- Euphaea masoni Selys, 1879
- Euphaea ochracea Selys, 1859
- Euphaea pseudodispar Sadasivan & Bhakare, 2021 (E)
- Euphaea thosegharensis Sadasivan & Bhakare, 2021 (E)
- Schmidtiphaea schmidi Asahina, 1978 (E)
- Schmidtiphaea chittaranjani (Lahiri, 2003) (E)

== Philogangidae ==
- Philoganga montana (Hagen in Selys, 1859)

== Rhipidolestidae ==
- Burmargiolestes laidlawi Lieftinck, 1960 (E)

== Coenagrionidae ==
- Aciagrion approximans (Selys, 1876)
- Aciagrion azureum Fraser, 1922
- Aciagrion borneense Ris, 1911
- Aciagrion hisopa (Selys, 1876)
- Aciagrion occidentale Laidlaw, 1919
- Aciagrion olympicum Laidlaw, 1919
- Aciagrion pallidum Selys, 1891
- Agriocnemis clauseni Fraser, 1922
- Agriocnemis corbeti Kumar & Prasad, 1978
- Agriocnemis dabreui Fraser, 1919
- Agriocnemis femina (Brauer, 1868)
- Agriocnemis kalinga Nair & Subramanian, 2014
- Agriocnemis keralensis Peters, 1981 (E)
- Agriocnemis lacteola Selys, 1877
- Agriocnemis nana Laidlaw, 1914
- Agriocnemis pieris Laidlaw, 1919
- Agriocnemis pygmaea (Rambur, 1842)
- Agriocnemis splendidissima Laidlaw, 1919
- Amphiallagma parvum (Selys, 1877)
- Archibasis oscillans (Selys, 1877)
- Argiocnemis rubescens Selys, 1877
- Ceriagrion aeruginosum (Brauer, 1869)
- Ceriagrion auranticum Fraser, 1922
- Ceriagrion azureum (Selys, 1891)
- Ceriagrion calamineum Lieftinck, 1951
- Ceriagrion cerinorubellum (Brauer, 1865)
- Ceriagrion chromothorax Joshi & Sawant, 2019 (E)
- Ceriagrion coromandelianum (Fabricius, 1798)
- Ceriagrion fallax Ris, 1914
- Ceriagrion olivaceum Laidlaw, 1914
- Ceriagrion pratermissum Lieftinck, 1929
- Ceriagrion rubiae Laidlaw, 1916
- Coenagrion exclamationis (Fraser, 1919)
- Enallagma cyathigerum (Charpentier, 1840)
- Ischnura elegans (Vander Linden, 1823)
- Ischnura forcipata Morton, 1907
- Ischnura inarmata Calvert, 1898
- Ischnura nursei (Morton, 1907)
- Ischnura pumilio (Charpentier, 1825)
- Ischnura rubilio Selys, 1876
- Ischnura rufostigma Selys, 1876
- Ischnura senegalensis (Rambur, 1842)
- Mortonagrion aborense (Laidlaw, 1914)
- Mortonagrion santha Christopher, Babu & Subramanian, 2026 (E)
- Mortonagrion varralli Fraser, 1920
- Paracercion calamorum (Ris, 1916)
- Paracercion malayanum (Selys, 1876)
- Pseudagrion andamanicum Fraser, 1924 (E)
- Pseudagrion australasiae Selys, 1876
- Pseudagrion bidentatum Morton, 1907
- Pseudagrion decorum (Rambur, 1842)
- Pseudagrion hypermelas Selys, 1876
- Pseudagrion indicum Fraser, 1924 (E)
- Pseudagrion laidlawi Fraser, 1922
- Pseudagrion malabaricum Fraser, 1924
- Pseudagrion microcephalum (Rambur, 1842)
- Pseudagrion pilidorsum (Brauer, 1868)
- Pseudagrion pruinosum (Burmeister, 1839)
- Pseudagrion rubriceps Selys, 1876
- Pseudagrion spencei Fraser, 1922
- Pseudagrion williamsoni Fraser, 1922

== Platycnemididae ==
- Caconeura gomphoides (Rambur, 1842) (E)
- Caconeura obscura (Fraser, 1933) (E)
- Caconeura ramburi (Fraser, 1922) (E)
- Caconeura risi (Fraser, 1931) (E)
- Caconeura t-coerulea (Fraser, 1933) (E)
- Calicnemia ardena Sawant, Joshi, Pawar, Khan, Nawge & Kunte, 2026 (E)
- Calicnemia arunachala Sawant, Joshi, Pawar, Khan, Nawge & Kunte, 2026 (E)
- Calicnemia doonensis Sangal & Tyagi, 1984 (E)
- Calicnemia erythromelas (Selys, 1891)
- Calicnemia eximia (Selys, 1863)
- Calicnemia flavovittata Sawant, Joshi, Pawar, Khan, Nawge & Kunte, 2026 (E)
- Calicnemia imitans Lieftinck, 1948
- Calicnemia miles (Laidlaw, 1917)
- Calicnemia mimumkoa Sawant, Joshi, Pawar, Khan, Nawge & Kunte, 2026 (E)
- Calicnemia miniata (Selys, 1886)
- Calicnemia mortoni (Laidlaw, 1917)
- Calicnemia mukherjeei Lahiri, 1976 (E)
- Calicnemia naga Sawant, Joshi, Pawar, Khan, Nawge & Kunte, 2026 (E)
- Calicnemia nipalica Kimmins, 1958 (E)
- Calicnemia pulverulans (Selys, 1886)
- Calicnemia rubromacula Sawant, Joshi, Pawar, Khan, Nawge & Kunte, 2026 (E)
- Coeliccia bimaculata Laidlaw, 1914
- Coeliccia didyma (Selys, 1863)
- Coeliccia dorothea Fraser, 1933 (E)
- Coeliccia fraseri Laidlaw, 1932 (E)
- Coeliccia loogali Fraser in Laidlaw, 1932
- Coeliccia magna Sawant, Joshi, Pawar, Khan, Nawge & Kunte, 2026 (E)
- Coeliccia prakritiae Lahiri, 1985 (E)
- Coeliccia renifera (Selys, 1886)
- Coeliccia rossi Asahina, 1984 (E)
- Coeliccia rotundata Asahina, 1984
- Coeliccia sarbottama Lahiri, 1987 (E)
- Coeliccia schmidti Asahina, 1984 (E)
- Coeliccia svihleri Asahina, 1970
- Coeliccia vacca Laidlaw, 1932
- Copera marginipes (Rambur, 1842)
- Copera vittata Selys, 1863
- Disparoneura apicalis (Fraser, 1924) (E)
- Disparoneura quadrimaculata (Rambur, 1842) (E)
- Elattoneura atkinsoni (Selys, 1886) (E)
- Elattoneura campioni (Fraser, 1922) (E)
- Elattoneura nigerrima (Laidlaw, 1917) (E)
- Elattoneura nihari Mitra, 1995 (E)
- Elattoneura souteri (Fraser, 1924) (E)
- Elattoneura tetrica (Laidlaw, 1917) (E)
- Esme cyaneovittata Fraser, 1922 (E)
- Esme longistyla Fraser, 1931 (E)
- Esme mudiensis Fraser, 1931 (E)
- Indocnemis orang (Förster in Laidlaw, 1907)
- Melanoneura agasthyamalaica Chandran, Chandran, Jose & Koparde, 2024 (E)
- Melanoneura bilineata Fraser, 1922 (E)
- Nososticta nancowra Rajeshkumar, 2018 (E)
- Nososticta nicobarica Rajeshkumar, Raghunathan & Chandra, 2017 (E)
- Onychargia atrocyana (Selys, 1865)
- Phylloneura rupestris Chandran, Chandran & Jose, 2024 (E)
- Phylloneura westermanni (Selys, 1860) (E)
- Platycnemis dealbata Selys, 1863
- Prodasineura autumnalis (Fraser, 1922)
- Prodasineura odoneli (Fraser, 1922)
- Prodasineura verticalis (Selys, 1860)
- Pseudocopera ciliata (Selys, 1863)
- Pseudocopera superplatypes Fraser, 1927

== Epiophlebiidae ==
- Epiophlebia laidlawi Tillyard, 1921

== Aeshnidae ==
- Aeshna juncea (Linnaeus, 1758)
- Aeshna mixta Latreille, 1805
- Aeshna petalura Martin, 1906
- Anaciaeschna jaspidea (Burmeister, 1839)
- Anaciaeschna martini (Selys, 1897)
- Anax ephippiger (Burmeister, 1839)
- Anax guttatus (Burmeister, 1839)
- Anax immaculifrons Rambur, 1842
- Anax imperator Leach, 1815
- Anax indicus Lieftinck, 1942
- Anax nigrofasciatus Oguma, 1915
- Anax panybeus Hagen, 1867
- Anax parthenope (Selys, 1839)
- Cephalaeschna acanthifrons Joshi & Kunte, 2017 (E)
- Cephalaeschna acutifrons (Martin, 1909)
- Cephalaeschna klapperichi (Schmidt, 1961)
- Cephalaeschna masoni (Martin, 1909)
- Cephalaeschna orbifrons Selys, 1883
- Cephalaeschna patrai Dawn, 2021 (E)
- Cephalaeschna triadica Lieftinck, 1977
- Cephalaeschna viridifrons (Fraser, 1922)
- Gynacantha albistyla Fraser, 1927
- Gynacantha andamanae Yeh & Veenakumari, 2000 (E)
- Gynacantha anandmati Sawant & Kambli, 2023 (E)
- Gynacantha arnaudi Asahina, 1984 (E)
- Gynacantha bainbriggei Fraser, 1922 (E)
- Gynacantha basiguttata Selys, 1882
- Gynacantha bayadera Selys, 1891
- Gynacantha biharica Fraser, 1927 (E)
- Gynacantha dravida Lieftinck, 1960
- Gynacantha khasiaca McLachlan, 1896
- Gynacantha millardi Fraser, 1920
- Gynacantha odoneli Fraser, 1922 (E)
- Gynacantha pallampurica Lahiri, Sandhu & Walia, 2007 (E)
- Gynacantha rammohani Mitra & Lahiri, 1975 (E)
- Gynacantha rotundata Navás, 1930 (E)
- Gynacantha subinterrupta Rambur, 1842
- Gynacanthaeschna sikkima (Karsch, 1891)
- Oligoaeschna andamani Chhotani, Lahiri & Mitra, 1983 (E)
- Periaeschna flinti Asahina, 1978
- Periaeschna magdalena Martin, 1909
- Periaeschna nocturnalis Fraser, 1927
- Periaeschna unifasciata Fraser, 1935
- Petaliaeschna fletcheri Fraser, 1927 (E)
- Planaeschna intersedens (Martin, 1909)
- Planaeschna poumai Joshi & Kunte, 2017 (E)
- Polycanthagyna erythromelas (McLachlan, 1896)
- Polycanthagyna ornithocephala (McLachlan, 1896)
- Sarasaeschna decorata (Lieftinck, 1968)
- Sarasaeschna dosdewaensis Joshi, Sawant, Pawar, Khan, Gassah, Ismavel & Kunte, 2026 (E)
- Sarasaeschna khasiana Lieftinck, 1968 (E)
- Sarasaeschna martini (Laidlaw, 1921)
- Sarasaeschna nuboides Joshi, Sawant, Pawar, Khan, Gassah, Ismavel & Kunte, 2026 (E)
- Sarasaeschna speciosa Karube, 1998 (E)
- Sarasaeschna sigotaayo Joshi, Sawant, Pawar, Khan, Gassah, Ismavel & Kunte, 2026 (E)
- Tetracanthagyna waterhousei McLachlan, 1898

== Gomphidae ==
- Acrogomphus fraseri Laidlaw, 1925 (E)
- Anisogomphus bivittatus Selys, 1854
- Anisogomphus caudalis Fraser, 1926
- Anisogomphus occipitalis (Selys, 1854)
- Anisogomphus orites Laidlaw, 1922
- Anormogomphus heteropterus Selys, 1854 (E)
- Anormogomphus kiritschenkoi Bartenef, 1913
- Asiagomphus nilgiricus (Laidlaw, 1922) (E)
- Asiagomphus odoneli (Fraser, 1922)
- Asiagomphus personatus (Selys, 1873)
- Burmagomphus cauvericus Fraser, 1926 (E)
- Burmagomphus chaukulensis Joshi, Ogale & Sawant, 2022 (E)
- Burmagomphus divaricatus Lieftinck, 1964
- Burmagomphus hasimaricus Fraser, 1926
- Burmagomphus laidlawi Fraser, 1924 (E)
- Burmagomphus pyramidalis Laidlaw, 1922 (E)
- Burmagomphus sivalikensis Laidlaw, 1922 (E)
- Cyclogomphus flavoannulatus Rangnekar, Dharwadkar, Sadasivan & Subramanian, 2019 (E)
- Cyclogomphus heterostylus Selys, 1854 (E)
- Cyclogomphus wilkinsi Fraser, 1926 (E)
- Cyclogomphus ypsilon Selys, 1854 (E)
- Davidioides martini Fraser, 1924 (E)
- Davidius aberrans (Selys, 1873)
- Davidius davidii Selys, 1878
- Davidius delineatus Fraser, 1926
- Davidius kumaonensis Fraser, 1926 (E)
- Davidius malloryi Fraser, 1926 (E)
- Dubitogomphus bidentatus (Fraser, 1930) (E)
- Euthygomphus martini (Fraser, 1922)
- Gomphidia fletcheri Fraser, 1923 (E)
- Gomphidia ganeshi Chotani, Lahiri & Mitra, 1983 (E)
- Gomphidia kodaguensis Fraser, 1923 (E)
- Gomphidia leonorae Mitra, 1994 (E)
- Gomphidia platyceps Fraser, 1953 (E)
- Gomphidia podhigai Babu & Subramanian, 2019 (E)
- Gomphidia t-nigrum Selys, 1854
- Gomphidia williamsoni Fraser, 1923
- Heliogomphus kalarensis Fraser, 1934 (E)
- Heliogomphus promelas (Selys, 1873) (E)
- Heliogomphus selysi Fraser, 1925
- Heliogomphus spirillus (Fraser, 1922) (E)
- Ictinogomphus angulosus (Selys, 1854)
- Ictinogomphus decoratus (Selys, 1854)
- Ictinogomphus distinctus Ram, 1985 (E)
- Ictinogomphus kishori Ram, 1985
- Ictinogomphus pertinax (Selys, 1854)
- Ictinogomphus rapax (Rambur, 1842)
- Lamelligomphus biforceps (Selys, 1878)
- Lamelligomphus nilgiriensis (Fraser, 1922)
- Lamelligomphus risi (Fraser, 1922)
- Macrogomphus annulatus (Selys, 1854) (E)
- Macrogomphus montanus Selys, 1869
- Macrogomphus robustus Selys, 1854
- Macrogomphus seductus Fraser, 1926
- Macrogomphus wynaadicus Fraser, 1924 (E)
- Megalogomphus bicornutus Fraser, 1922 (E)
- Megalogomphus flavicolor (Fraser, 1923) (E)
- Megalogomphus hannyngtoni (Fraser, 1923) (E)
- Megalogomphus smithii (Selys, 1854)
- Megalogomphus superbus Fraser, 1931 (E)
- Melligomphus acinaces (Laidlaw, 1922) (E)
- Merogomphus aryanadensis Chandran, Sawant, Chandran, Koparde, Jose & Kunte, 2025 (E)
- Merogomphus flavoreductus Chandran, Sawant, Chandran, Koparde, Jose & Kunte, 2025 (E)
- Merogomphus longistigma (Fraser, 1922) (E)
- Merogomphus tamaracherriensis Fraser, 1931 (E)
- Microgomphus souteri Fraser, 1924 (E)
- Microgomphus torquatus (Selys, 1854) (E)
- Microgomphus verticalis (Selys, 1873) (E)
- Nepogomphus modestus (Selys, 1878)
- Nepogomphus walli (Fraser, 1924)
- Nihonogomphus pulcherrimus (Fraser, 1927)
- Nychogomphus duaricus (Fraser, 1924)
- Nychogomphus saundersii (Selys, 1854)
- Nychogomphus striatus (Fraser, 1924)
- Onychogomphus cacharicus Fraser, 1924 (E)
- Onychogomphus cerastis (Selys, 1854)
- Onychogomphus grammicus (Rambur, 1842) (E)
- Onychogomphus malabarensis (Fraser, 1924) (E)
- Onychogomphus meghalayanus Lahiri, 1987 (E)
- Ophiogomphus reductus Calvert, 1898
- Orientogomphus indicus (Lahiri, 1987) (E)
- Paragomphus echinoccipitalis (Fraser, 1922) (E)
- Paragomphus lindgreni (Fraser, 1923)
- Paragomphus lineatus (Selys, 1850)
- Perissogomphus stevensi Laidlaw, 1922
- Phaenandrogomphus aureus (Laidlaw, 1922) (E)
- Platygomphus benritarum Joshi & Mital, 2022 (E)
- Platygomphus dolabratus Selys, 1854
- Scalmogomphus bistrigatus (Hagen in Selys, 1854)
- Scalmogomphus schmidti Fraser, 1937
- Stylogomphus inglisi Fraser, 1922

== Chlorogomphidae ==
- Chlorogomphus campioni (Fraser, 1924) (E)
- Chlorogomphus fraseri St. Quentin, 1936 (E)
- Chlorogomphus mortoni Fraser, 1936
- Chlorogomphus preciosus (Fraser, 1924)
- Chlorogomphus schmidti Asahina, 1986 (E)
- Chlorogomphus xanthoptera (Fraser, 1919) (E)
- Chloropetalia selysi (Fraser, 1929)
- Watanabeopetalia atkinsoni (Selys, 1878)

== Cordulegasteridae ==
- Anotogaster basilis Selys, 1854
- Anotogaster gregoryi Fraser, 1924
- Anotogaster nipalensis Selys, 1854
- Cordulegaster brevistigma (Selys, 1854)
- Cordulegaster parvistigma (Selys, 1873) (E)
- Neallogaster hermionae (Fraser, 1927)
- Neallogaster latifrons (Selys, 1878)
- Neallogaster ornata (Asahina, 1982)
- Neallogaster schmidti Asahina, 1982

== Corduliidae ==
- Hemicordulia asiatica Selys, 1878
- Somatochlora daviesi Lieftinck, 1977

== Libellulidae ==
- Acisoma panorpoides Rambur, 1842
- Aethriamanta brevipennis (Rambur, 1842)
- Agrionoptera insignis (Rambur, 1842)
- Amphithemis vacillans Selys, 1891
- Atratothemis reelsi Wilson, 2005
- Brachydiplax chalybea Brauer, 1868
- Brachydiplax farinosa Krüger, 1902
- Brachydiplax sobrina (Rambur, 1842)
- Brachythemis contaminata (Fabricius, 1793)
- Bradinopyga geminata (Rambur, 1842)
- Bradinopyga konkanensis Joshi & Sawant, 2020 (E)
- Camacinia gigantea (Brauer, 1867)
- Camacinia harterti Karsch, 1890
- Cratilla lineata (Brauer, 1878)
- Cratilla metallica (Brauer, 1878)
- Crocothemis erythraea (Brullé, 1832)
- Crocothemis servilia (Drury, 1770)
- Diplacodes lefebvrii (Rambur, 1842)
- Diplacodes nebulosa (Fabricius, 1793)
- Diplacodes trivialis (Rambur, 1842)
- Epithemis mariae (Laidlaw, 1915) (E)
- Epithemis wayanadensis Chandran, Raju, Jose & Mirza, 2023 (E)
- Hydrobasileus croceus (Brauer, 1867)
- Hylaeothemis apicalis Fraser, 1926 (E)
- Hylaeothemis gardeneri Fraser, 1927 (E)
- Indothemis carnatica (Fabricius, 1798)
- Indothemis limbata (Selys, 1891)
- Lathrecista asiatica (Fabricius, 1798)
- Libellula quadrimaculata Linnaeus, 1758
- Lyriothemis abrahami Sadasivan, Jose, Palot, Sudheer, Augustine, Kochunarayanan, Nair & George, 2025
- Lyriothemis acigastra (Selys, 1878)
- Lyriothemis bivittata (Rambur, 1842)
- Lyriothemis cleis Brauer, 1868
- Lyriothemis flava Oguma, 1915
- Lyriothemis keralensis Sawant, Chandran, Mathews & Kunte, 2026 (E)
- Lyriothemis lucifera Seehausen & Dawn, 2024 (E)
- Lyriothemis mortoni Ris, 1919
- Macrodiplax cora (Brauer, 1867)
- Nannophya pygmaea Rambur, 1842
- Nannophyopsis clara (Needham, 1930)
- Nesoxenia lineata (Selys, 1879)
- Neurothemis degener Selys, 1879
- Neurothemis fluctuans (Fabricius, 1793)
- Neurothemis fulvia (Drury, 1773)
- Neurothemis intermedia (Rambur, 1842)
- Neurothemis ramburi (Brauer, 1866)
- Neurothemis tullia (Drury, 1773)
- Onychothemis testacea Laidlaw, 1902
- Orthetrum andamanicum Bedjanič, Kalkman & Subramanian, 2020 (E)
- Orthetrum brunneum (Fonscolombe, 1837)
- Orthetrum cancellatum (Linnaeus, 1758)
- Orthetrum chrysis (Selys, 1891)
- Orthetrum coerulescens (Fabricius, 1798)
- Orthetrum erythronigrum Subramanian, Babu & Kalkman, 2020 (E)
- Orthetrum glaucum (Brauer, 1865)
- Orthetrum internum McLachlan, 1894
- Orthetrum luzonicum (Brauer, 1868)
- Orthetrum martensi Asahina, 1978 (E)
- Orthetrum pruinosum (Burmeister, 1839)
- Orthetrum sabina (Drury, 1770)
- Orthetrum taeniolatum (Schneider, 1845)
- Orthetrum testaceaum Burmeister, 1839
- Orthetrum triangulare (Selys, 1878)
- Palpopleura sexmaculata (Fabricius, 1787)
- Pantala flavescens (Fabricius, 1798)
- Phyllothemis eltoni Fraser, 1935
- Potamarcha congener (Rambur, 1842)
- Pseudothemis zonata (Burmeister, 1839)
- Pseudotramea prateri Fraser, 1920
- Rhodothemis rufa (Rambur, 1842)
- Rhyothemis phyllis (Sulzer, 1776)
- Rhyothemis plutonia Selys, 1883
- Rhyothemis triangularis Kirby, 1889
- Rhyothemis variegata (Linnaeus, 1763)
- Selysiothemis nigra (Vander Linden, 1825)
- Sympetrum arenicolor Jödicke, 1994
- Sympetrum fonscolombii (Selys, 1840)
- Sympetrum haritonovi Borisov, 1983
- Sympetrum hypomelas (Selys, 1884)
- Sympetrum meridionale (Selys, 1841)
- Sympetrum orientale (Selys, 1883)
- Sympetrum speciosum Oguma, 1915
- Sympetrum striolatum (Charpentier, 1840)
- Tetrathemis platyptera Selys, 1878
- Tholymis tillarga (Fabricius, 1798)
- Tramea basilaris (Palisot de Beauvois, 1805)
- Tramea eurybia Selys, 1878
- Tramea limbata (Desjardins, 1832)
- Tramea transmarina Selys, 1878
- Tramea virginia (Rambur, 1842)
- Trithemis aurora (Burmeister, 1839)
- Trithemis festiva (Rambur, 1842)
- Trithemis kirbyi Selys, 1891
- Trithemis pallidinervis (Kirby, 1889)
- Urothemis signata (Rambur, 1842)
- Zygonyx iris Selys, 1869
- Zygonyx torridus (Kirby, 1889)
- Zyxomma obtusum Albarda, 1881
- Zyxomma breviventre (Martin, 1921)
- Zyxomma petiolatum Rambur, 1842

== Macromiidae ==
- Epophthalmia frontalis Selys, 1871
- Epophthalmia vittata Burmeister, 1839
- Epophthalmia vittigera (Rambur, 1842)
- Macromia annaimalaiensis Fraser, 1931 (E)
- Macromia bellicosa Fraser, 1924 (E)
- Macromia cingulata Rambur, 1842
- Macromia cupricincta Fraser, 1924
- Macromia ellisoni Fraser, 1924 (E)
- Macromia flavicincta Selys, 1874 (E)
- Macromia flavocolorata Fraser, 1922
- Macromia flavovittata Fraser, 1935 (E)
- Macromia ida Fraser, 1924 (E)
- Macromia indica Fraser, 1924 (E)
- Macromia irata Fraser, 1924 (E)
- Macromia kannharaiensis Dalvi, Koli & Thakur, 2024 (E)
- Macromia miniata Fraser, 1924 (E)
- Macromia moorei Selys, 1874
- Macromia pallida Fraser, 1924
- Macromia whitei Selys, 1871 (E)

== Idionychidae ==
- Idionyx corona Fraser, 1921 (E)
- Idionyx galeata Fraser, 1924 (E)
- Idionyx gomantakensis Subramanian, Rangnaker & Nayak, 2013 (E)
- Idionyx imbricata Fraser, 1926 (E)
- Idionyx intricata Fraser, 1926 (E)
- Idionyx minima Fraser, 1931 (E)
- Idionyx nadganiensis Fraser, 1924 (E)
- Idionyx nilgiriensis (Fraser, 1918) (E)
- Idionyx optata Selys, 1878
- Idionyx periyashola Fraser, 1939 (E)
- Idionyx rhinoceroides Fraser, 1934 (E)
- Idionyx saffronata Fraser, 1924 (E)
- Idionyx stevensi Fraser, 1924
- Idionyx travancorensis Fraser, 1931 (E)

== Macromidiidae ==
- Macromidia donaldi (Fraser, 1924)
