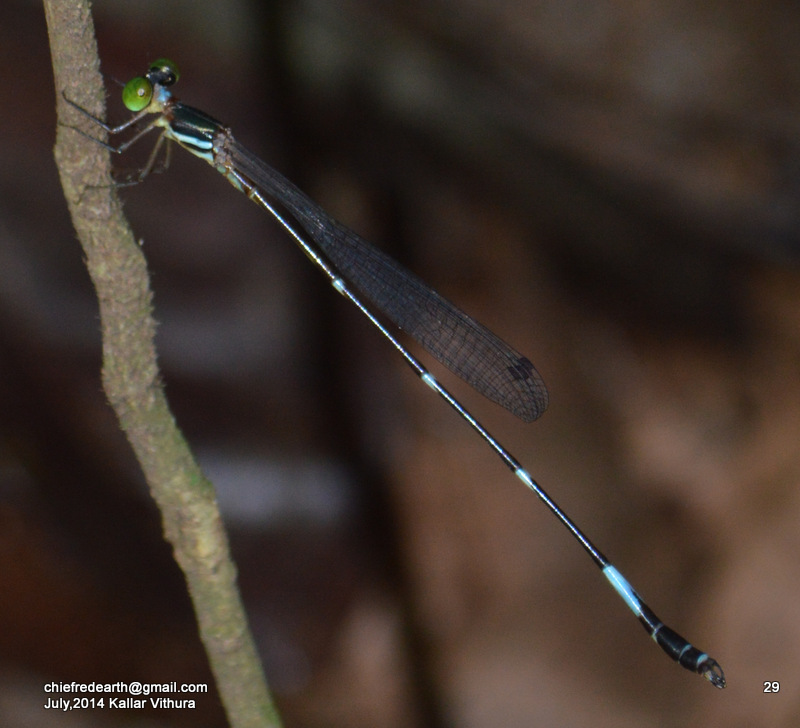
- Male

Scientific classification
- Kingdom: Animalia
- Phylum: Arthropoda
- Clade: Pancrustacea
- Class: Insecta
- Order: Odonata
- Suborder: Zygoptera
- Family: Platystictidae
- Genus: Protosticta
- Species: P. ponmudiensis

Binomial name
- Protosticta ponmudiensis Kiran, Kalesh & Kunte, 2015

= Protosticta ponmudiensis =

Species of damselfly

Protosticta ponmudiensis, Travancore reedtail, is a damselfly species in the family Platystictidae. It is endemic to southern Western Ghats in India. It is named after the type locality (Ponmudi), a hill station near Thiruvananthapuram, Kerala, where the species was discovered. It was first found by a zoologist and photographer named Sharin.

The genus Protosticta has eleven species reported from the India, of which nine are known from Western Ghats.

This species was found in 2013 from the Ponmudi, Thiruvananthapuram district, Kerala which is part of Agasthyamalai region of the southern Western Ghats. It was perched on a dry climber approximately 1.5m above the ground inside the shaded parts of the stream. It was found near slow flowing hill streams and brooks. It shares the habitat with other Protosticta gravelyi and Protosticta davenporti, and with other odonates, Caconeura species, Euphaea fraseri, Idionyx saffronata and Heliogomphus promelas. This species can be distinguished from other Protosticta based on its large size, bright green eyes, the broad dorsal stripe on the base of segment 7, and very distinct anal appendages.

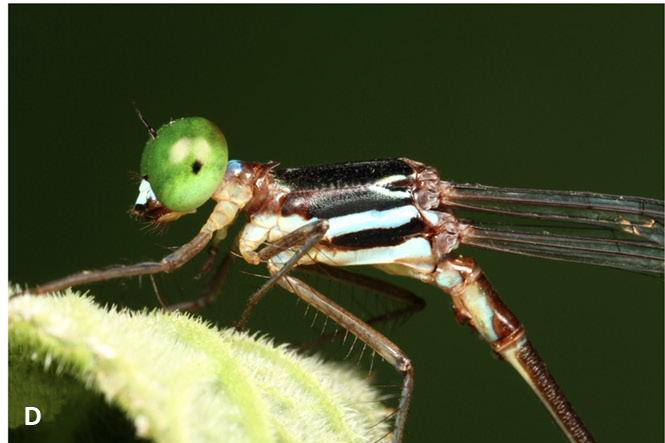
Head (male)

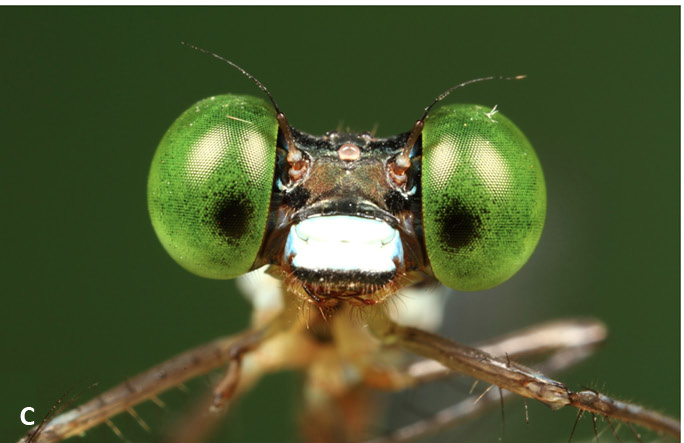
Eyes (male)

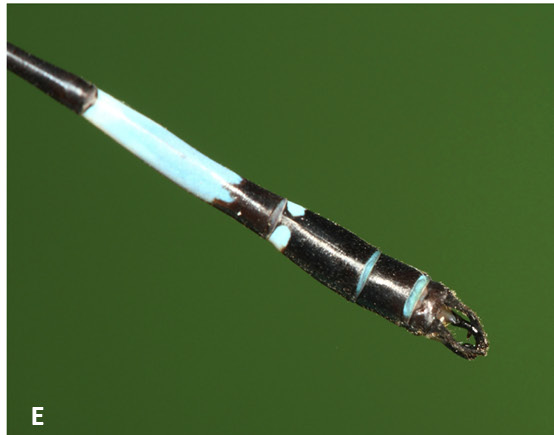
Terminal abdominal segments

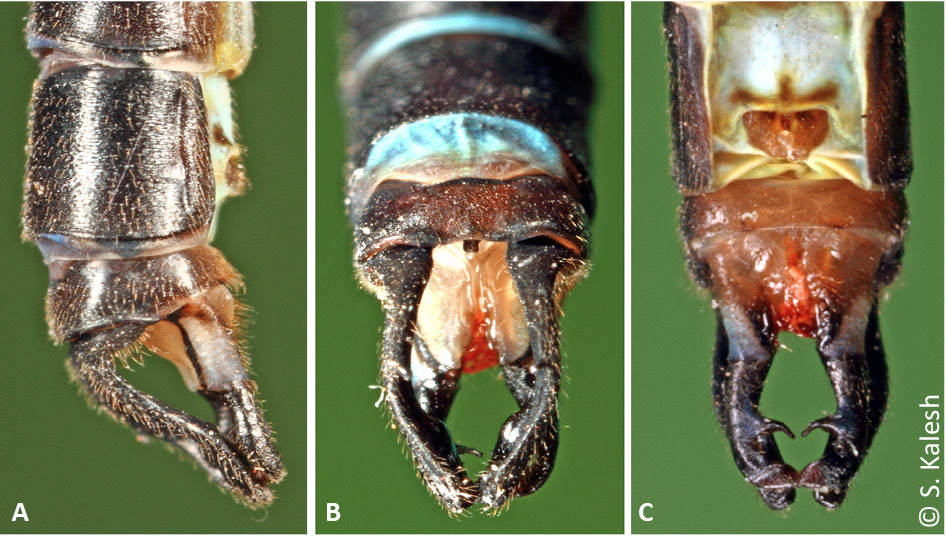
Anal appendages (male)

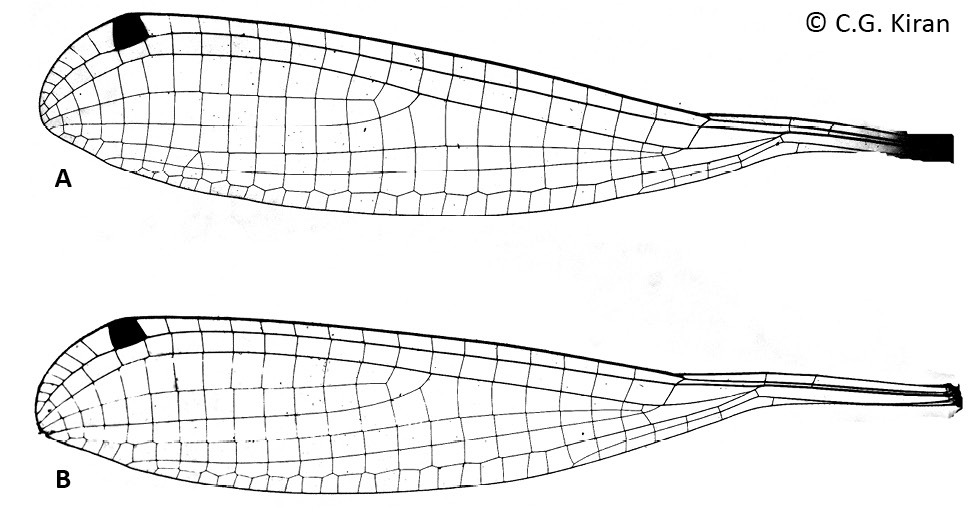
Wings (male)

== See also ==
- List of odonates of India
- List of odonata of Kerala
