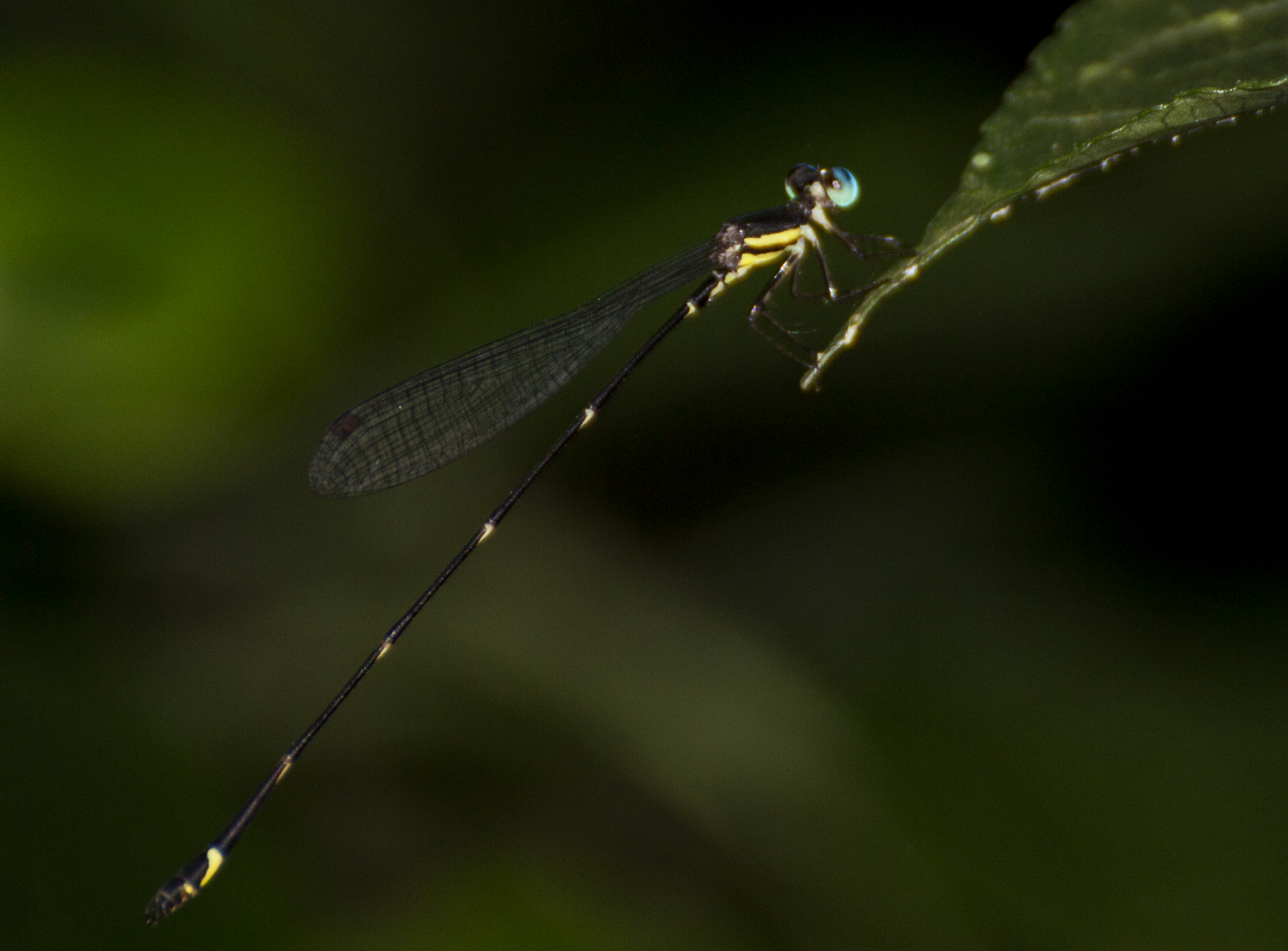
- Male

Scientific classification
- Kingdom: Animalia
- Phylum: Arthropoda
- Clade: Pancrustacea
- Class: Insecta
- Order: Odonata
- Suborder: Zygoptera
- Family: Platystictidae
- Genus: Protosticta
- Species: P. sholai

Binomial name
- Protosticta sholai Subramanian & Babu, 2020

= Protosticta sholai =

Species of damselfly

Protosticta sholai is a damselfly species in the family Platystictidae. It is endemic to southern Western Ghats in India. The species is named sholai considering the local name of its habitat, montane evergreen forests of South Western Ghats.

The genus Protosticta has fifteen species reported from India, of which twelve are known from Western Ghats.

It is a black damselfly with blue eyes. Its thorax is black, marked with yellow stripes. Wings are transparent with dark brown pterostigma. Its abdomen is black, marked with yellow. Segments 1 and 2 are yellow laterally. Segments 3 to 8 are with broad yellow basal annules. Segment 8 is with its sides yellow in addition to the basal annule. Segments 9 has yellow spot, laterally. Segment 10 is unmarked. Anal appendages are black with dark brown apices. Female is very similar to the male, but shorter and more robustly built.

This species can be distinguished from other Protosticta species based on its blue eyes. It can be distinguished from P. monticola by the presence of extensive yellow markings on abdominal segments 8–9 and eye coloration. P. monticola has dorsum of abdominal segments 8–9 metallic black and black capped bluish-green eyes.

This species was first observed at Upper Manalar, Meghamalai Wildlife Sanctuary, Tamil Nadu. Later it is found in Periyar National Park, Kerala too.

== See also ==
- List of odonates of India
- List of odonata of Kerala
