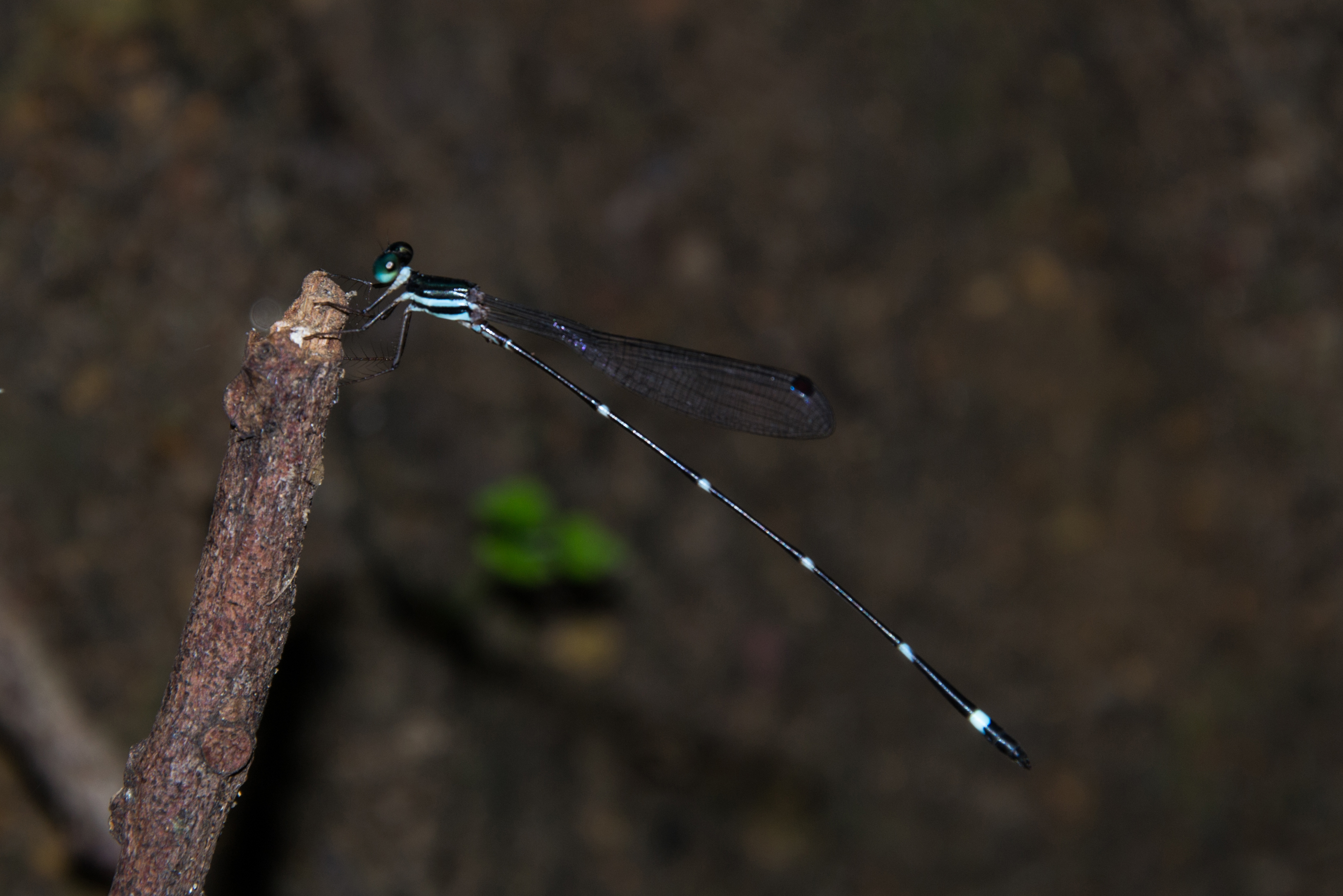
- Male

Conservation status
- Data Deficient (IUCN 3.1)

Scientific classification
- Kingdom: Animalia
- Phylum: Arthropoda
- Clade: Pancrustacea
- Class: Insecta
- Order: Odonata
- Suborder: Zygoptera
- Family: Platystictidae
- Genus: Protosticta
- Species: P. rufostigma

Binomial name
- Protosticta rufostigma Kimmins, 1958

= Protosticta rufostigma =

Species of damselfly

Protosticta rufostigma is a damselfly species in the family Platystictidae. It is endemic to Western Ghats in India.

The genus Protosticta has eleven species reported from India, of which nine are known from Western Ghats.

It is currently known only from the type locality Naraikadu, which is a part of the Kalakkad Mundanthurai Tiger Reserve. It is closely related to Protosticta davenporti but can be distinguished by the larger pterostigma, difference in the pattern of prothorax and the eighth abdominal segment, and the shape of the anal appendages.

== See also ==
- List of odonates of India
- List of odonata of Kerala
