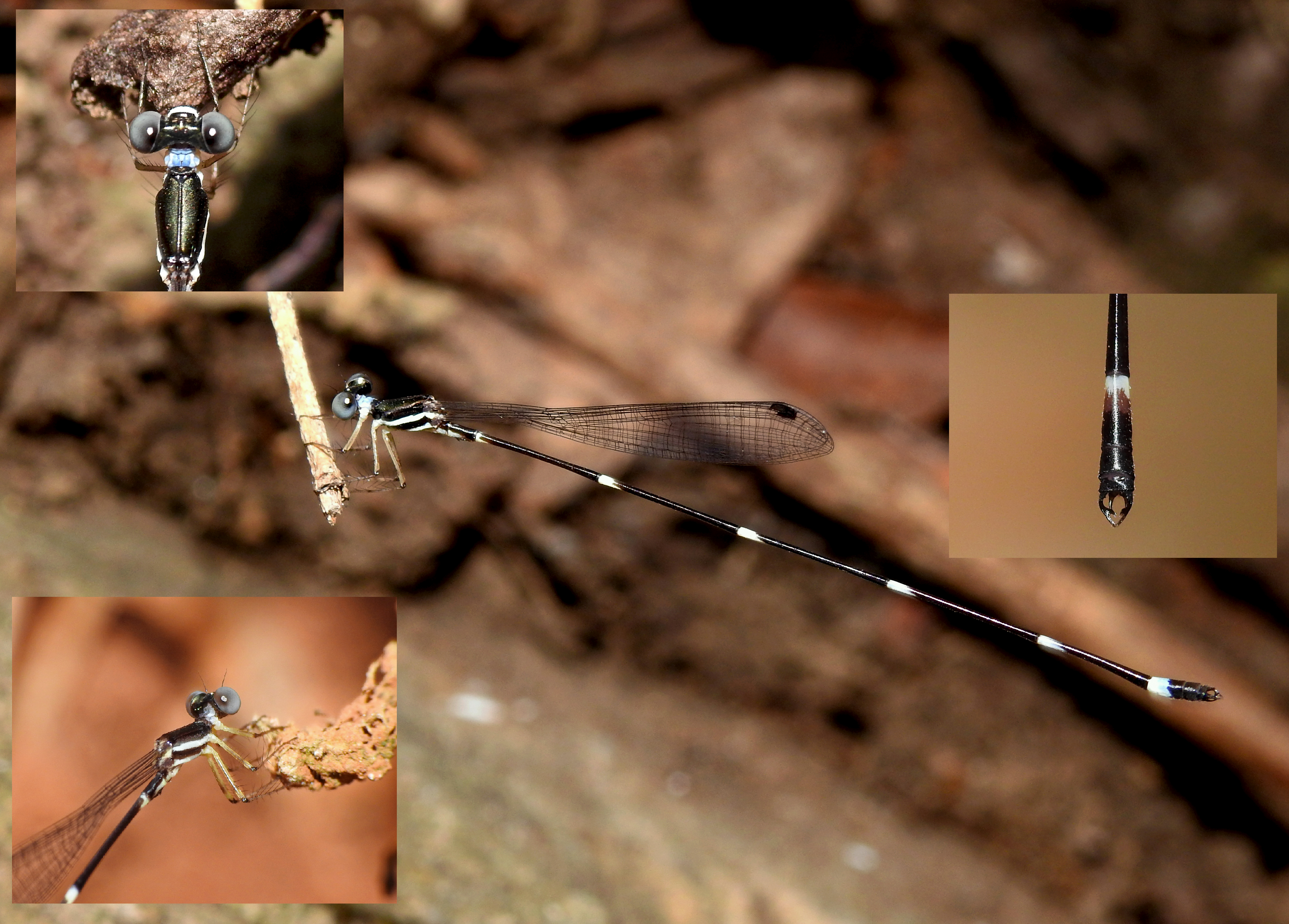
- Male

Scientific classification
- Kingdom: Animalia
- Phylum: Arthropoda
- Clade: Pancrustacea
- Class: Insecta
- Order: Odonata
- Suborder: Zygoptera
- Family: Platystictidae
- Genus: Protosticta
- Species: P. mortoni

Binomial name
- Protosticta mortoni Fraser, 1924

= Protosticta mortoni =

Species of damselfly

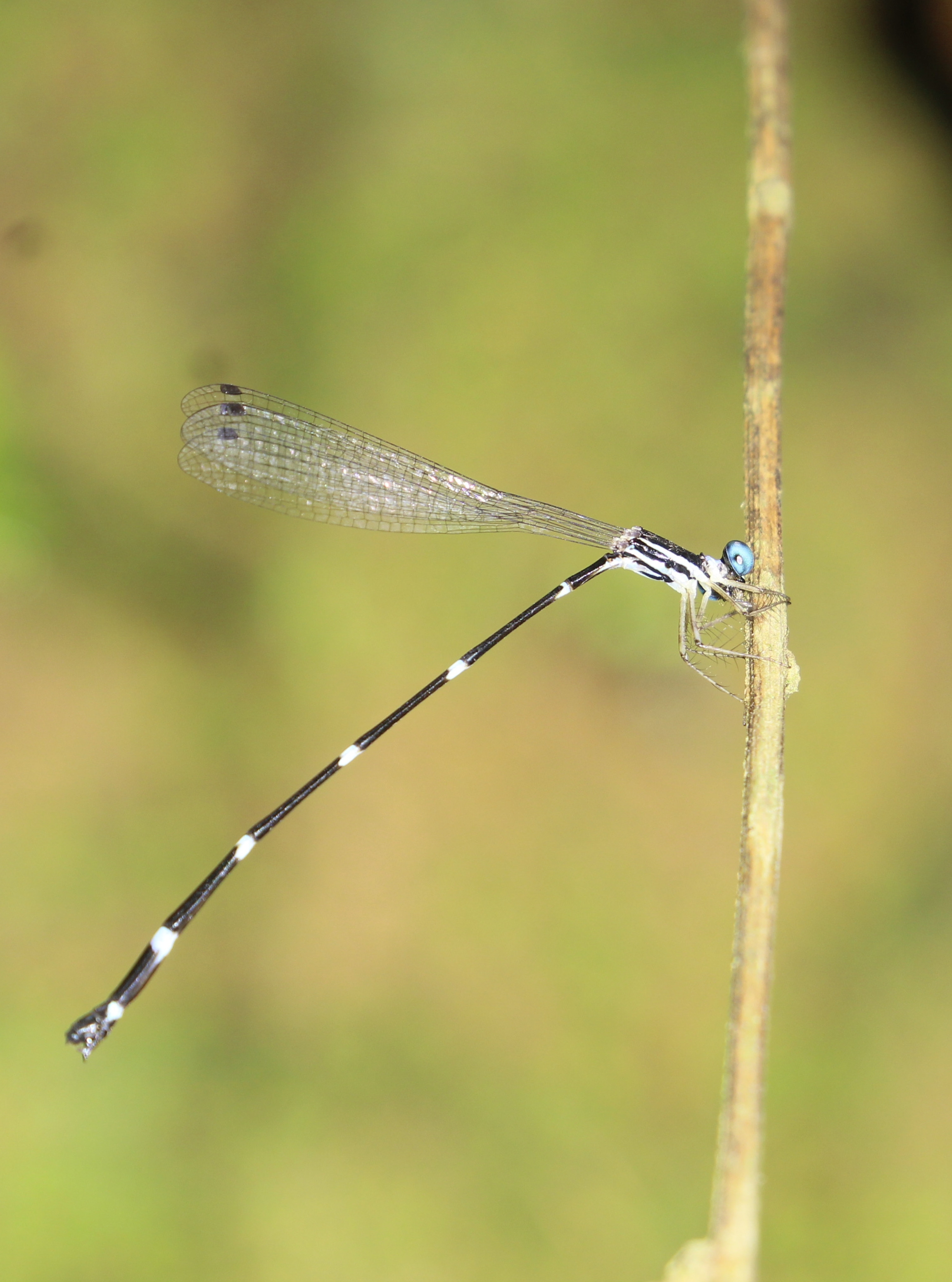
Protosticta mortoni photo from wayanad Kerala

Protosticta mortoni, is a damselfly species in the family Platystictidae. It is endemic to Western Ghats in India.

== Description and habitat ==
It is a large slender damselfly with black capped ultramarine blue eyes. Its prothorax is blue with posterior lobe black. Its thorax is glossy black, marked with two narrow blue lateral stripes on each side. There is a similar stripe on the posterior part of metepimeron. Abdomen is black, marked with white and blue. Sides of segment 1 is blue; 2 is white. Segment 3 is with a narrow basal annule. Segments 4 to 7 are with broad basal annules. Segment 8 is with its basal half turquoise-blue, extending along sides nearly as far as apex, and separated from the base of segment by a very narrow black basal ring. Segments 9 and 10 are unmarked. Anal appendages are black. Female is very similar to the male, but shorter and more robustly built.

It is similar to Protosticta gravelyi, but can be distinguished by the prothorax blue with its posterior lobe black and by the markings on segment 8, the basal half of dorsum being unmarked.

== See also ==
- List of odonates of India
- List of odonata of Kerala
