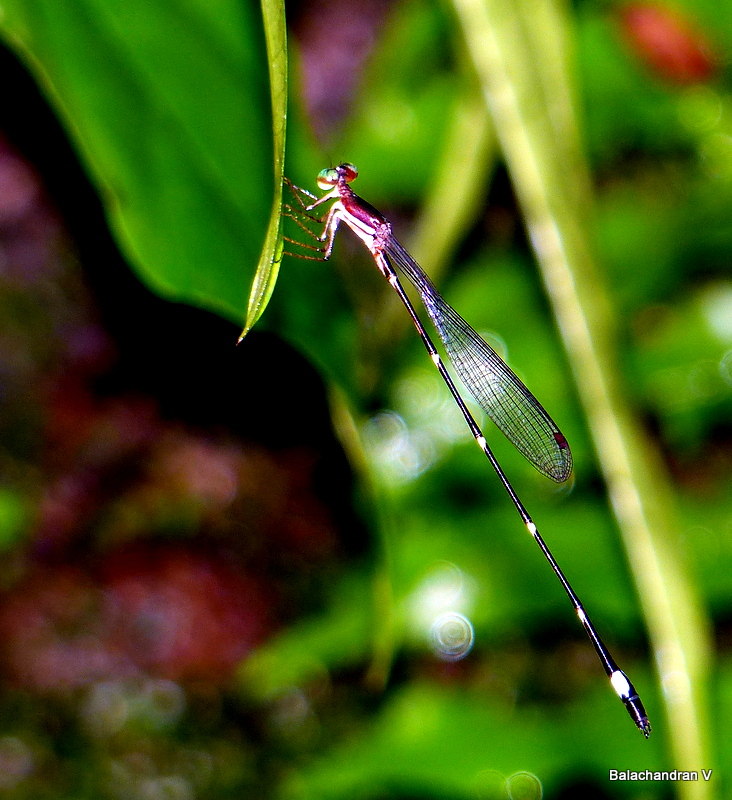
- Male
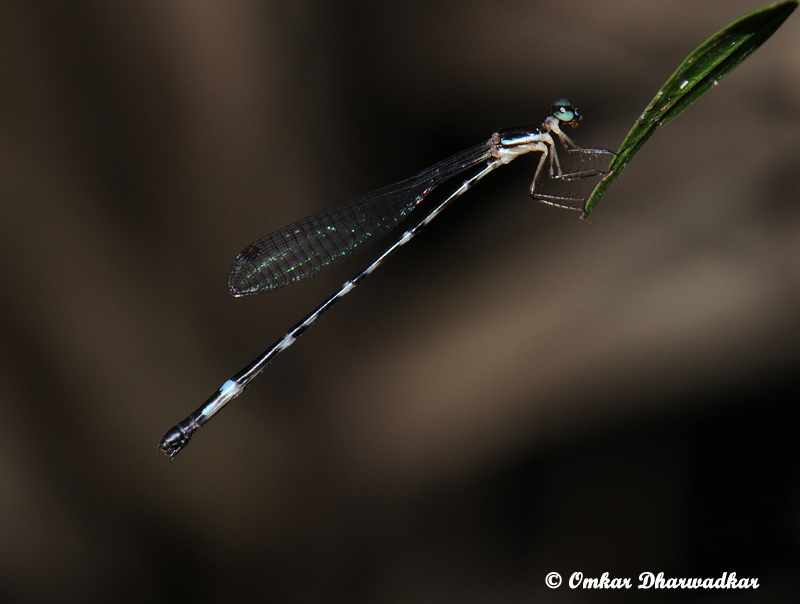
- Female

Conservation status
- Vulnerable (IUCN 3.1)

Scientific classification
- Kingdom: Animalia
- Phylum: Arthropoda
- Clade: Pancrustacea
- Class: Insecta
- Order: Odonata
- Suborder: Zygoptera
- Family: Platystictidae
- Genus: Protosticta
- Species: P. sanguinostigma

Binomial name
- Protosticta sanguinostigma Fraser, 1922

Synonyms
- Protosticta cerinostigma Fraser, 1924

= Protosticta sanguinostigma =

Species of damselfly

Protosticta sanguinostigma, the red spot reedtail, is a damselfly species in the family Platystictidae. It is endemic to Western Ghats in India. It is known to occur only in a few localities.

== Description and habitat ==
It is a large slender damselfly with eyes bottle-green above and pale green below separated by an equatorial band of reddish-brown. Its thorax is glossy bronze-black on dorsum and pale blue on the sides. There is a narrow stripe of black bordered with brown across the anterior border of the metepimeron. Wings are transparent with blood-red pterostigma. Abdomen is dark-brown on dorsum and paler on the sides. Segment 1 and 2 are marked with white laterally. Segments 3 to 6 have broad distal black annules. Segments 4 to 7 have broader blue basal annules. Segment 8 is turquoise-blue with black apical border. Segments 9 and 10 are entirely black. Anal appendages are black. Female is similar to the male; but much shorter and stouter built.

It is found in first and second order streams with good forest cover. Earlier this species was known only from Kodagu, Wayanad and Nilgiris. However, recent studies show that populations do exist in other places in South India.

== See also ==
- List of odonates of India
- List of odonata of Kerala
