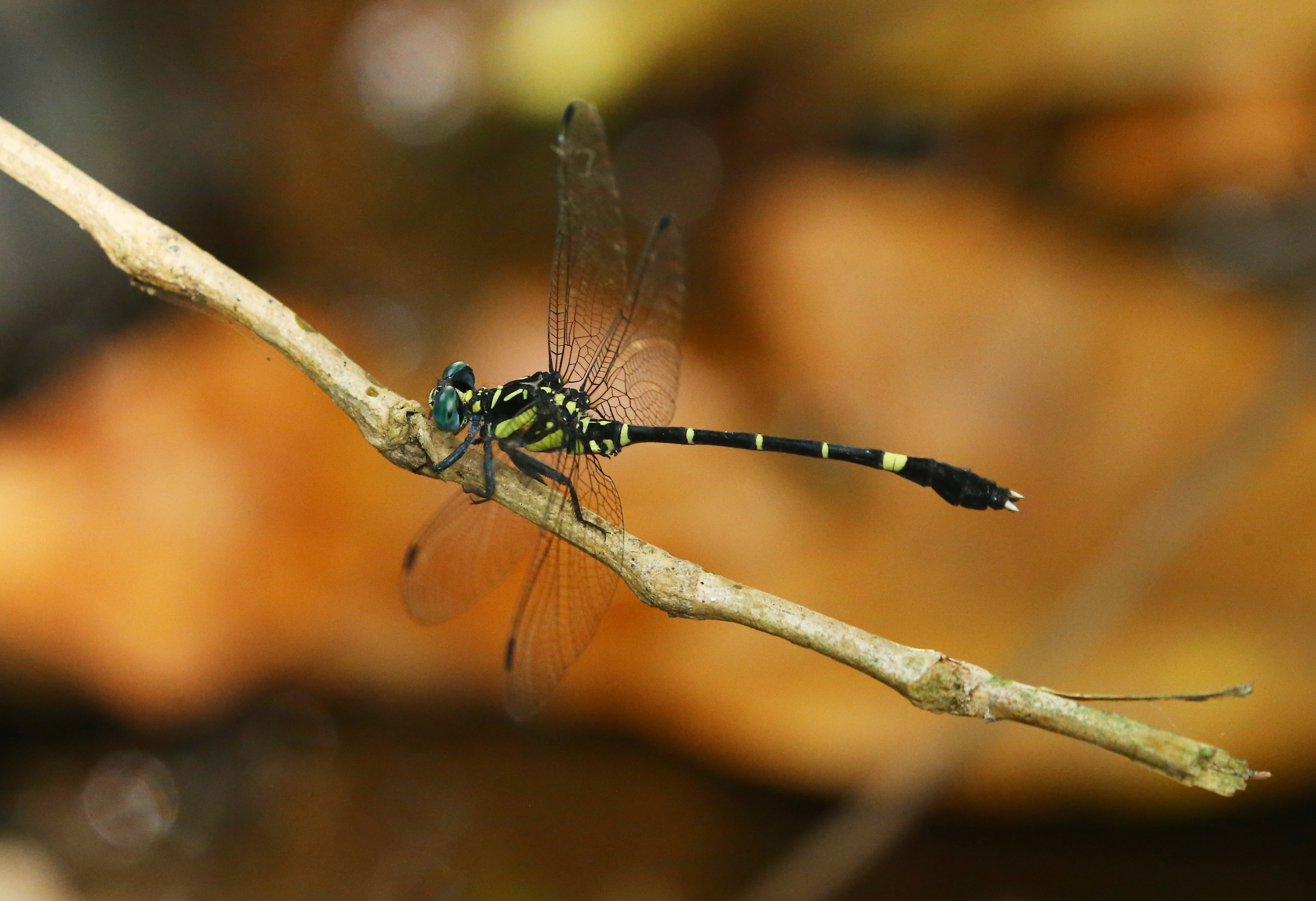
- from Thattekkad, Kerala

Conservation status
- Data Deficient (IUCN 3.1)

Scientific classification
- Kingdom: Animalia
- Phylum: Arthropoda
- Class: Insecta
- Order: Odonata
- Infraorder: Anisoptera
- Family: Gomphidae
- Genus: Davidioides
- Species: D. martini

Binomial name
- Davidioides martini Fraser, 1924

= Davidioides martini =

Species of dragonfly

Davidioides martini, the Syrandiri clubtail, is a species of dragonfly in the family Gomphidae. It is known only from the Western Ghats of India.

== Description and habitat ==
It is a medium-sized dragonfly with thorax black on dorsum, and yellow on the sides. There is a slightly oblique ante-humeral stripe and two narrow parallel black stripes on the sutures enclosing an equally narrow yellow line. Abdomen is black, marked with yellow. Segment 1 has a large spot on the dorsum and the sides. Segment 2 has a mid-dorsal spot. Segment 3 to 7 have basal rings, narrow on 3 to 6, occupying the basal half on segment 7. Segment 8 to 10 are unmarked. Anal appendages are yellow, black on the base.

This species is found in banks of montane forest streams where it breeds.

== See also ==
- List of odonates of India
- List of odonata of Kerala
