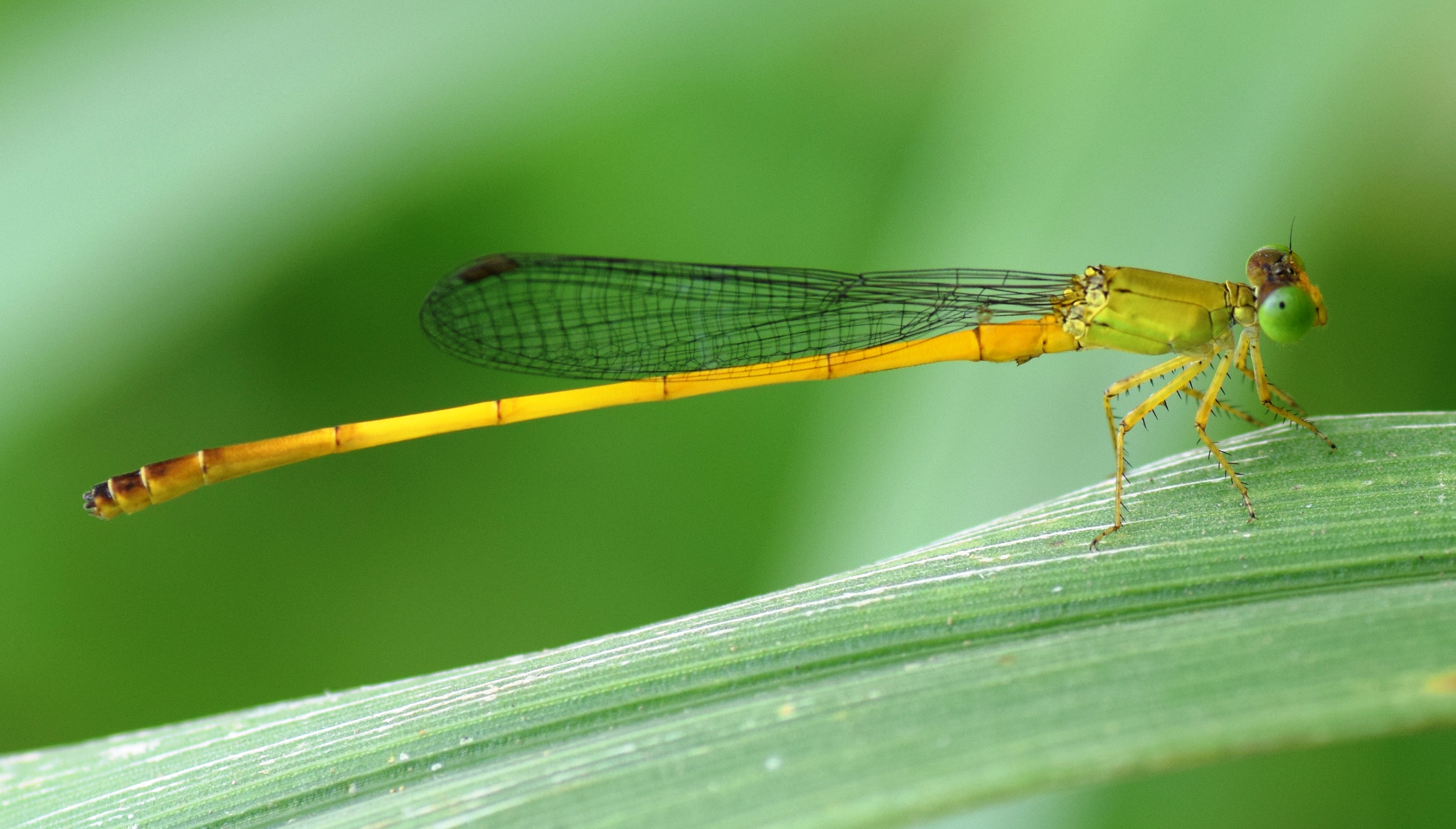
- male

Scientific classification
- Kingdom: Animalia
- Phylum: Arthropoda
- Clade: Pancrustacea
- Class: Insecta
- Order: Odonata
- Suborder: Zygoptera
- Family: Coenagrionidae
- Genus: Ceriagrion
- Species: C. chromothorax

Binomial name
- Ceriagrion chromothorax Joshi & Sawant, 2019

= Ceriagrion chromothorax =

Species of damselfly

Ceriagrion chromothorax is a species of damselfly in the family Coenagrionidae. it is commonly known as Sindhudurg marsh dart. This species can be found in South India.

This species is similar to Ceriagrion coromandelianum and Ceriagrion indochinense, but can be distinguished from them by its chrome yellow synthorax, structure of the prothorax, and the shape of caudal appendages. The name chromothorax is given for the bright yellow thoracic coloration. C. chromothorax is a larger species with a slimmer abdomen as compared to C. coromandelianum. Its abdomen is yellowish brown with black markings on the dorsum of the last few segments.

== See also ==
- List of odonates of India
- List of odonata of Kerala
