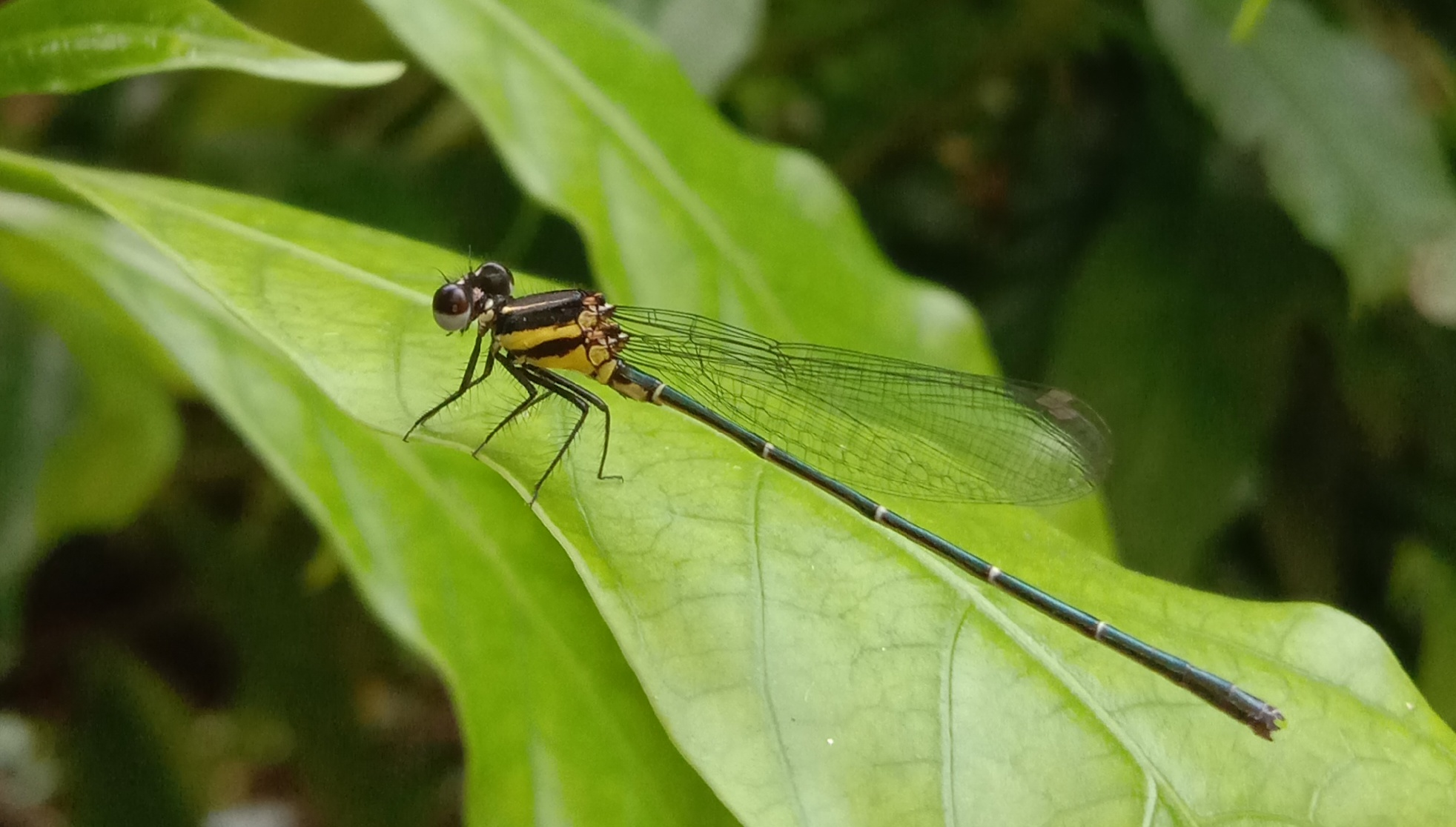

Scientific classification
- Kingdom: Animalia
- Phylum: Arthropoda
- Clade: Pancrustacea
- Class: Insecta
- Order: Odonata
- Suborder: Zygoptera
- Family: Platystictidae
- Genus: Protosticta
- Species: P. monticola

Binomial name
- Protosticta monticola Emiliyamma & Palot, 2016

= Protosticta monticola =

Species of damselfly

Protosticta monticola, monticola reedtail, is a damselfly species in the family Platystictidae. It is endemic to southern Western Ghats in India. The species is named monticola (mountain dweller) considering the natural habitat where the species was discovered.

The genus Protosticta has fifteen species reported from India, of which twelve are known from Western Ghats.

This species was first found in 2014 in high altitudes (above 1600m) of the Anaimalai Hills of Idukki district, Kerala, southern Western Ghats. The study found the presence of this species in highland shola forest ecosystems of Kambilipparachola and Nagamalachola of Marayur forest division and Mathikettan Shola National Park. The males were found away from the forest streams, in shaded areas among the shola forest undergrowth at Kambilipparachola. A few females and males were also found frequenting the sides of streams covered with forest canopy near Nagamalachola in Marayur forests. A few female specimens were found in a forest stream inside the shola forest. Other species observed with them were Euphaea cardinalis and Esme cyaneovittata. This is the only species found within the high altitude shola forests of the southern Western Ghats.

This is one of the small-sized Protosticta like Protosticta hearseyi. This species can be distinguished from other Protosticta species based on the completely black dorsal surface of its abdomen, 7th and 8th abdominal segments without yellow or blue color dorsally, and its distinct anal appendages.

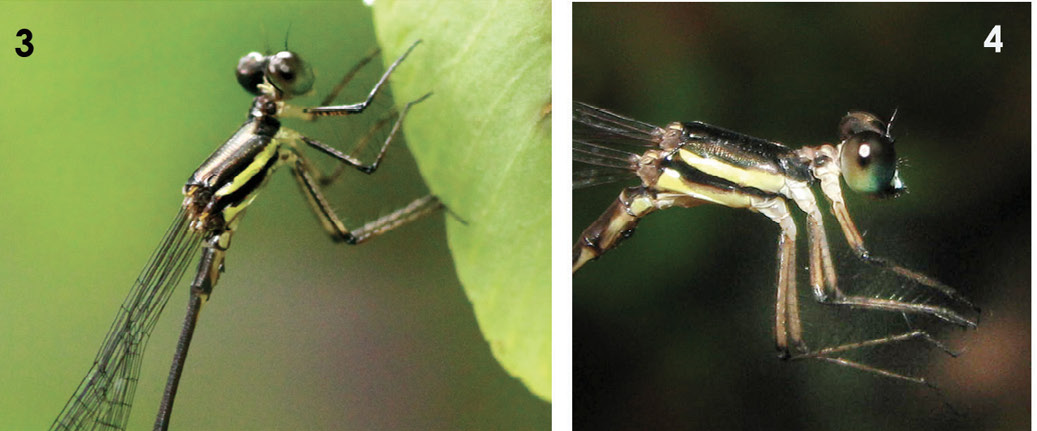
Head (male)

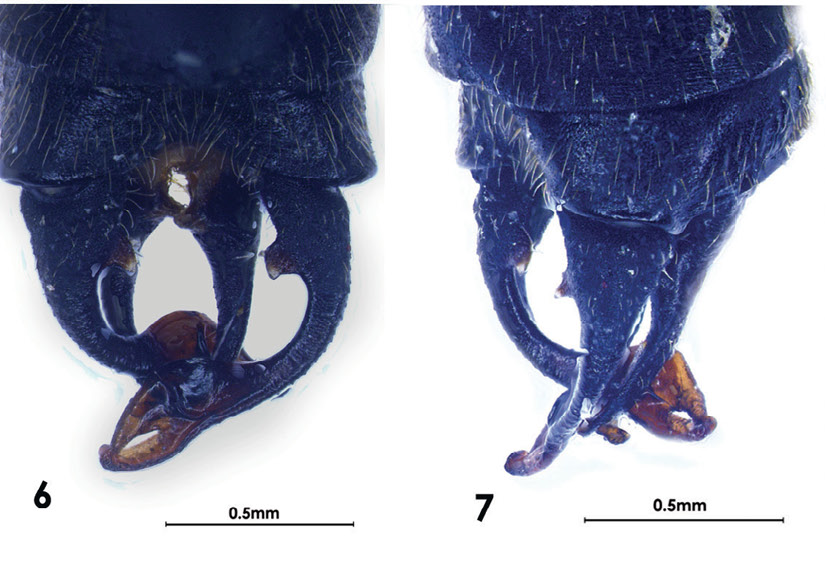
Anal appendages (male)

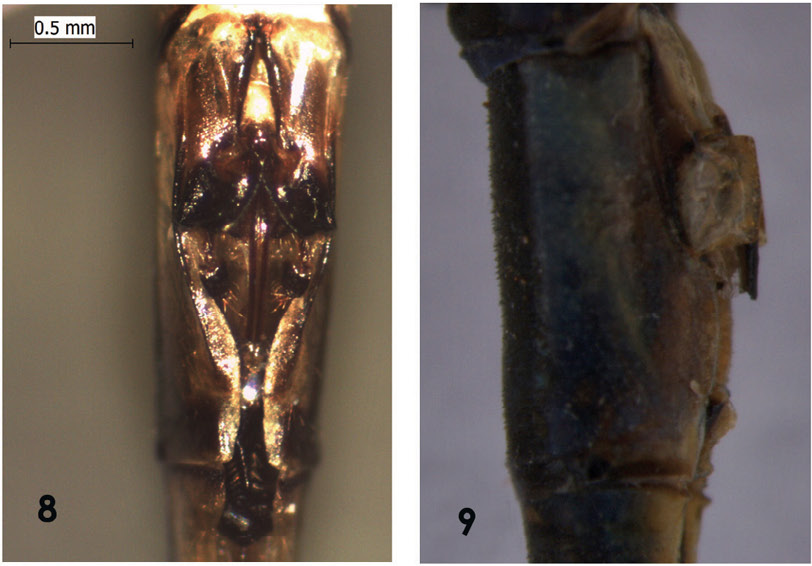
Genitalia (male)

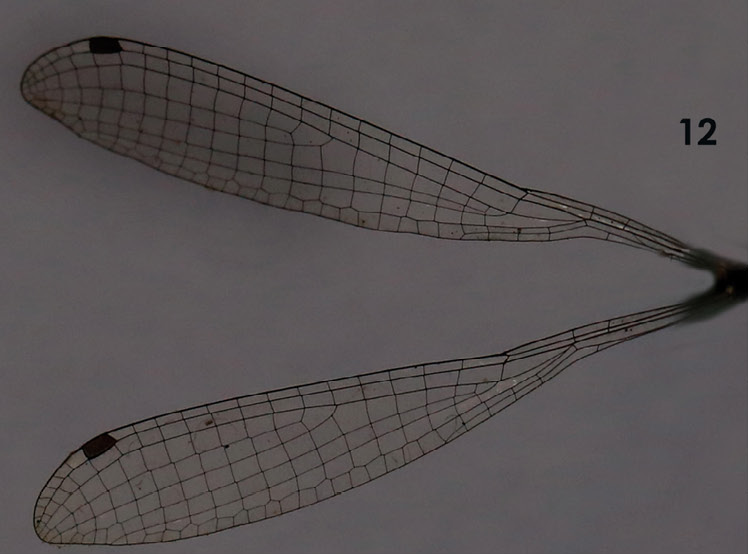
Wings (male)

== See also ==
- List of odonates of India
- List of odonata of Kerala
