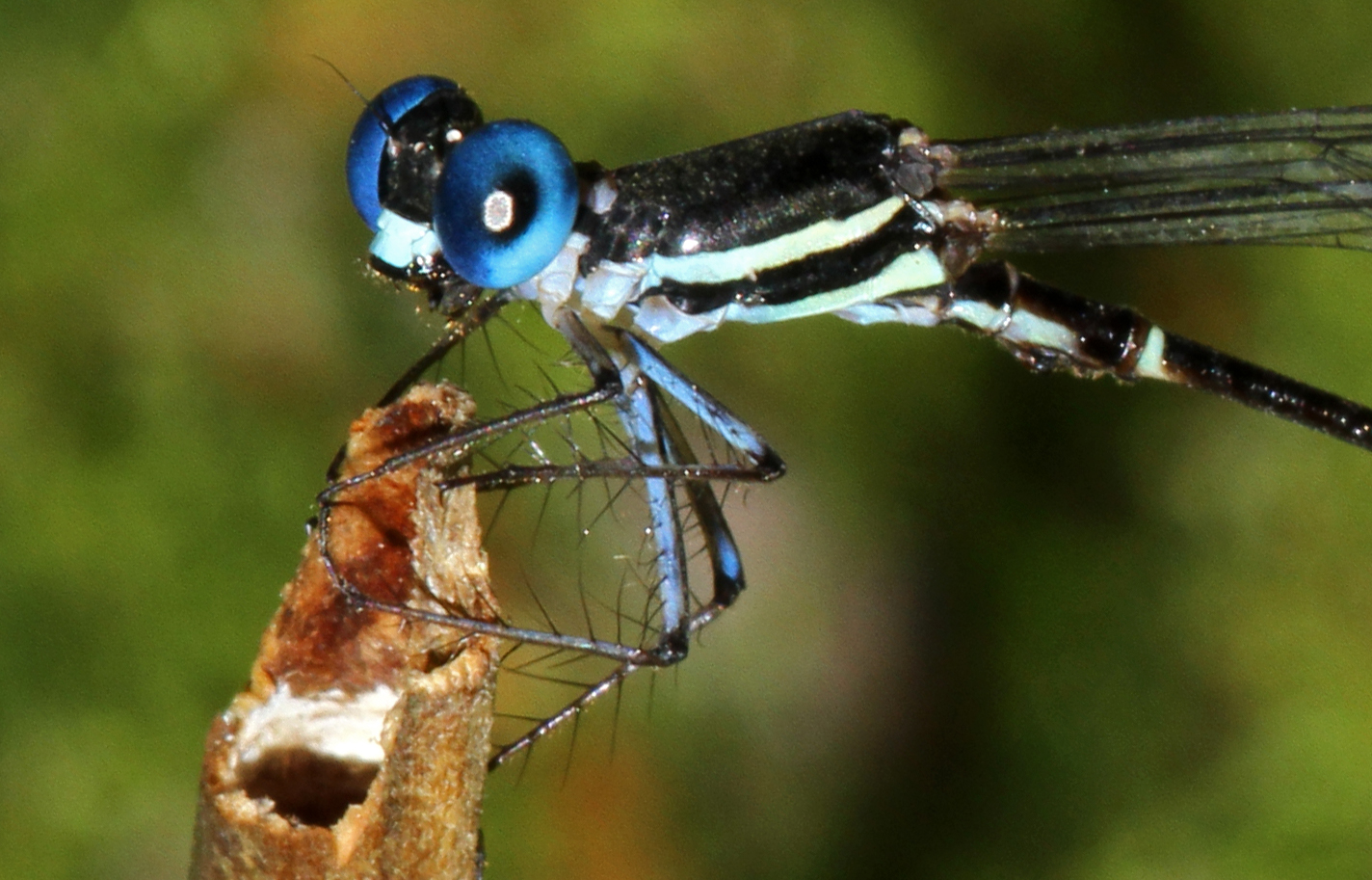

Scientific classification
- Kingdom: Animalia
- Phylum: Arthropoda
- Clade: Pancrustacea
- Class: Insecta
- Order: Odonata
- Suborder: Zygoptera
- Family: Platystictidae
- Genus: Protosticta
- Species: P. cyanofemora

Binomial name
- Protosticta cyanofemora Joshi, Subramanian, Babu & Kunte, 2020

= Protosticta cyanofemora =

Species of insect

Protosticta cyanofemora is a damselfly species in the family Platystictidae. It is endemic to southern Western Ghats in India. The species is named cyanofemora considering its bright blue femur.

The genus Protosticta has fifteen species reported from India, of which twelve are known from Western Ghats.

It is a black damselfly with bright blue eyes. Its prothorax is purple, marked with black. Its thorax is black, marked with creamy yellow stripes. The inner sides of the femur of the legs are blue. Wings are transparent with dark brown pterostigma. Its abdomen is black, marked with yellowish white. Segments 1 and 2 are white laterally. Segments 3 to 8 are with broad basal annules. Segment 8 is with its basal two-third yellowish-white and segments 9 and 10 are unmarked. Anal appendages are black with dark brown apices. Female is very similar to the male, but shorter and more robustly built.

This species can be distinguished from other Protosticta species based on its bright-blue facial markings, eyes, prothoracic markings, and femora.

This species was first observed at Pandimotta, Shendurney Wildlife Sanctuary, Kerala. Later it is found in Kalakkad Mundanthurai Tiger Reserve, Tirunelveli too.

== See also ==
- List of odonates of India
- List of odonata of Kerala
