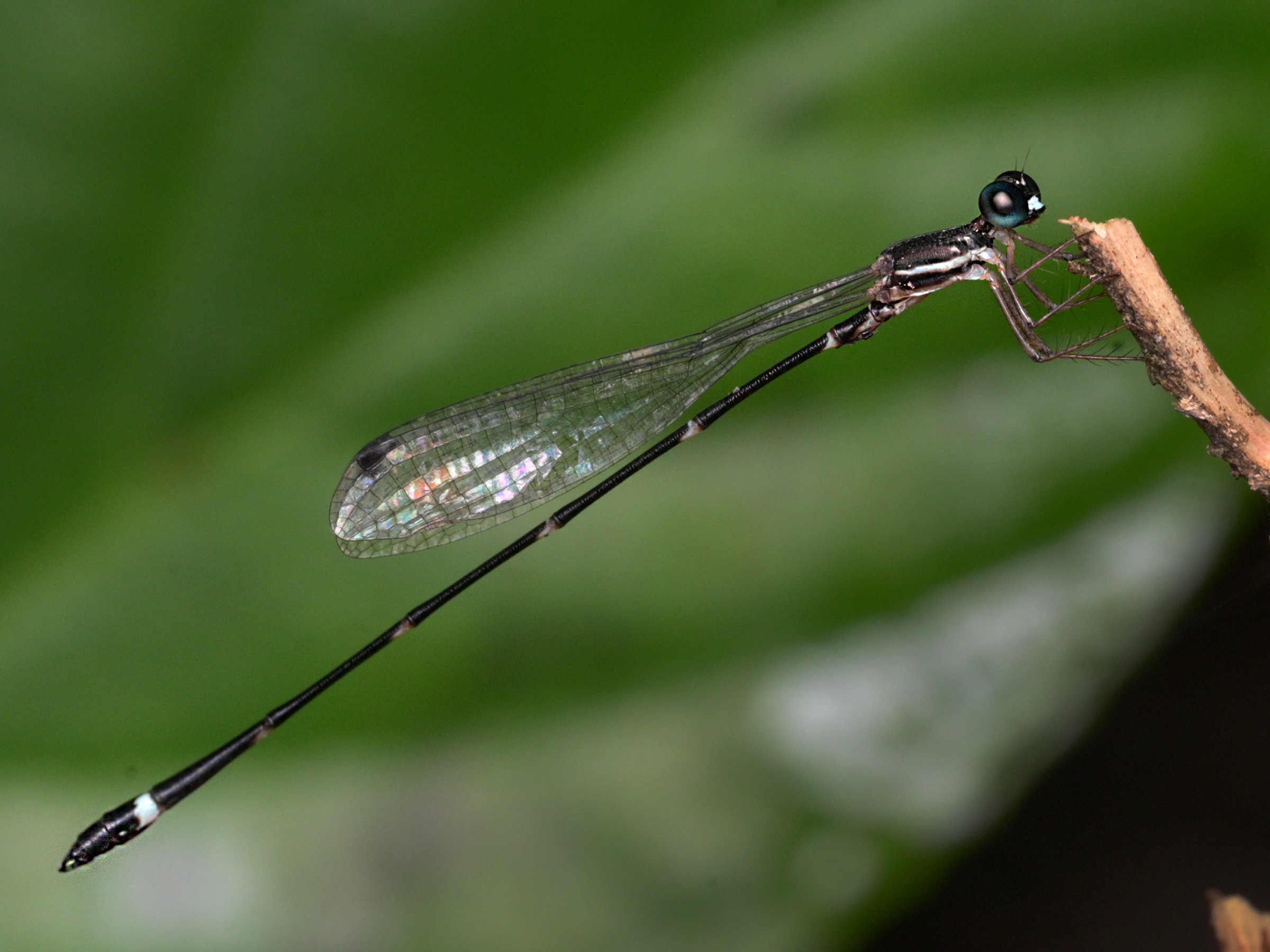

Scientific classification
- Kingdom: Animalia
- Phylum: Arthropoda
- Clade: Pancrustacea
- Class: Insecta
- Order: Odonata
- Suborder: Zygoptera
- Family: Platystictidae
- Genus: Protosticta
- Species: P. armageddonia

Binomial name
- Protosticta armageddonia Chandran, Payra, Deshpande & Koparde 2023

= Protosticta armageddonia =

Species of damselfly

Protosticta armageddonia, the armageddon reedtail, is a damselfly species in the family Platystictidae. It is endemic to Western Ghats in India.

== Discovery ==
P. armageddonia was first photographed on 7 December 2022 in Thiruvananthapuram, Kerala and was described in 2023.

== See also ==
- List of odonates of India
- List of odonata of Kerala
