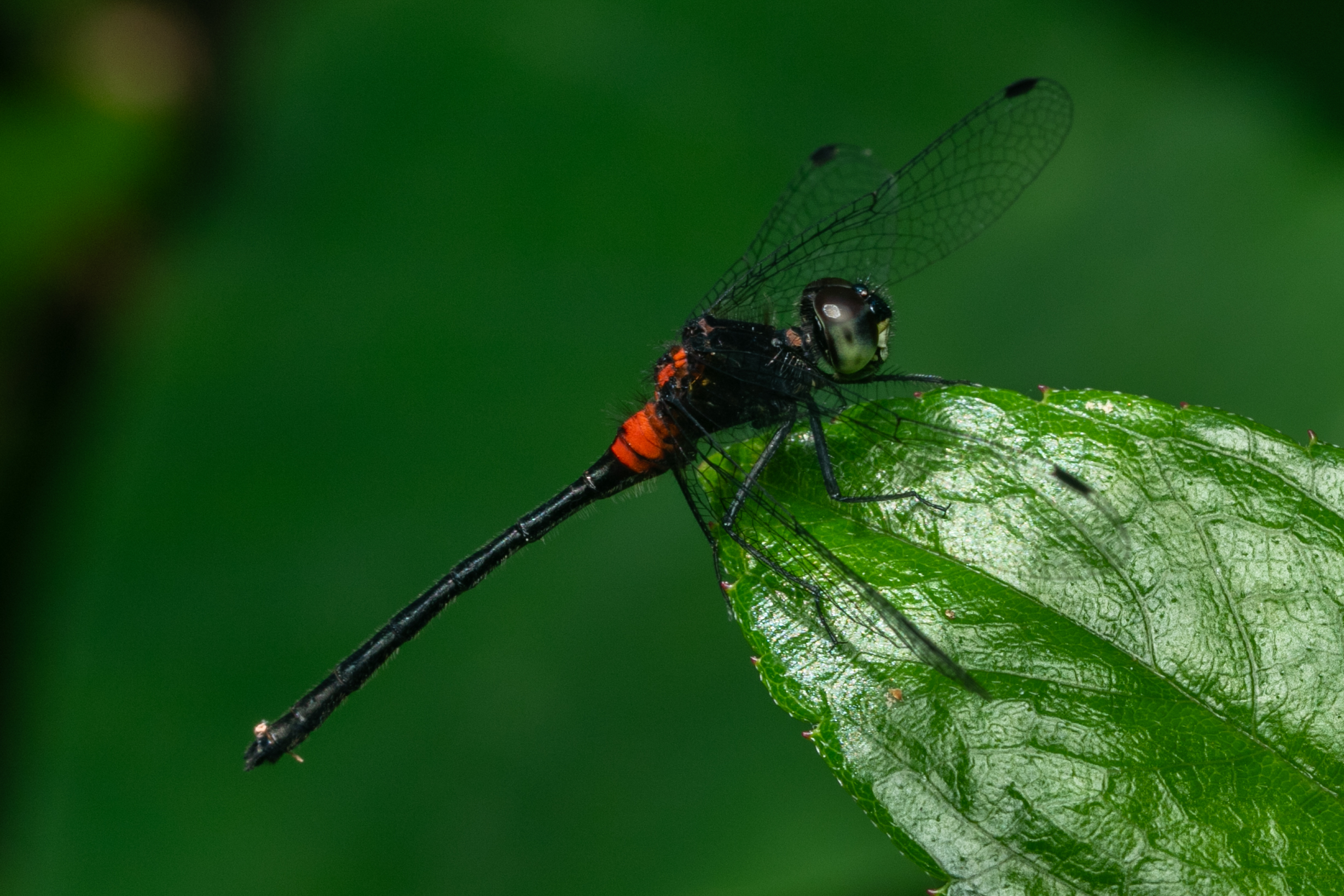
- Epithemis wayanadensis

Scientific classification
- Domain: Eukaryota
- Kingdom: Animalia
- Phylum: Arthropoda
- Class: Insecta
- Order: Odonata
- Infraorder: Anisoptera
- Family: Libellulidae
- Genus: Epithemis
- Species: E. wayanadensis

Binomial name
- Epithemis wayanadensis Chandran, Raju, Jose and Mirza, 2023

= Epithemis wayanadensis =

Species of dragonfly

Epithemis wayanadensis is a species of dragonfly in the family Libellulidae. It is endemic to the Western Ghats, India. Epithemis mariae is a very similar species found in south India.
