= Protosticta antelopoides =

Conservation status
- Data Deficient (IUCN 3.1)

Scientific classification
- Kingdom: Animalia
- Phylum: Arthropoda
- Clade: Pancrustacea
- Class: Insecta
- Order: Odonata
- Suborder: Zygoptera
- Family: Platystictidae
- Genus: Protosticta
- Species: P. antelopoides

Binomial name
- Protosticta antelopoides Fraser, 1931

Species of damselfly

Protosticta antelopoides, the spiny reedtail, is a damselfly species in the family Platystictidae. It is endemic to Western Ghats in India.

== Description and habitat ==
It is a large slender damselfly with bottle-green eyes. Its thorax is bluish-black on dorsum and sides are pale blue with a black stripe on the hinder border of the mesepimeron. Abdomen is black with pale yellow on the lower parts of sides. Segments 3 to 6 to have narrow yellow basal rings. Remaining segments are unmarked. It is bigger than any other known species of this genus. Female is similar to the male.

It is known to occur in Munnar, Idukki district and Kozhikode district of the Kerala. It is restricted to hill streams with good riparian forest cover.

== See also ==
- List of odonates of India
- List of odonata of Kerala
