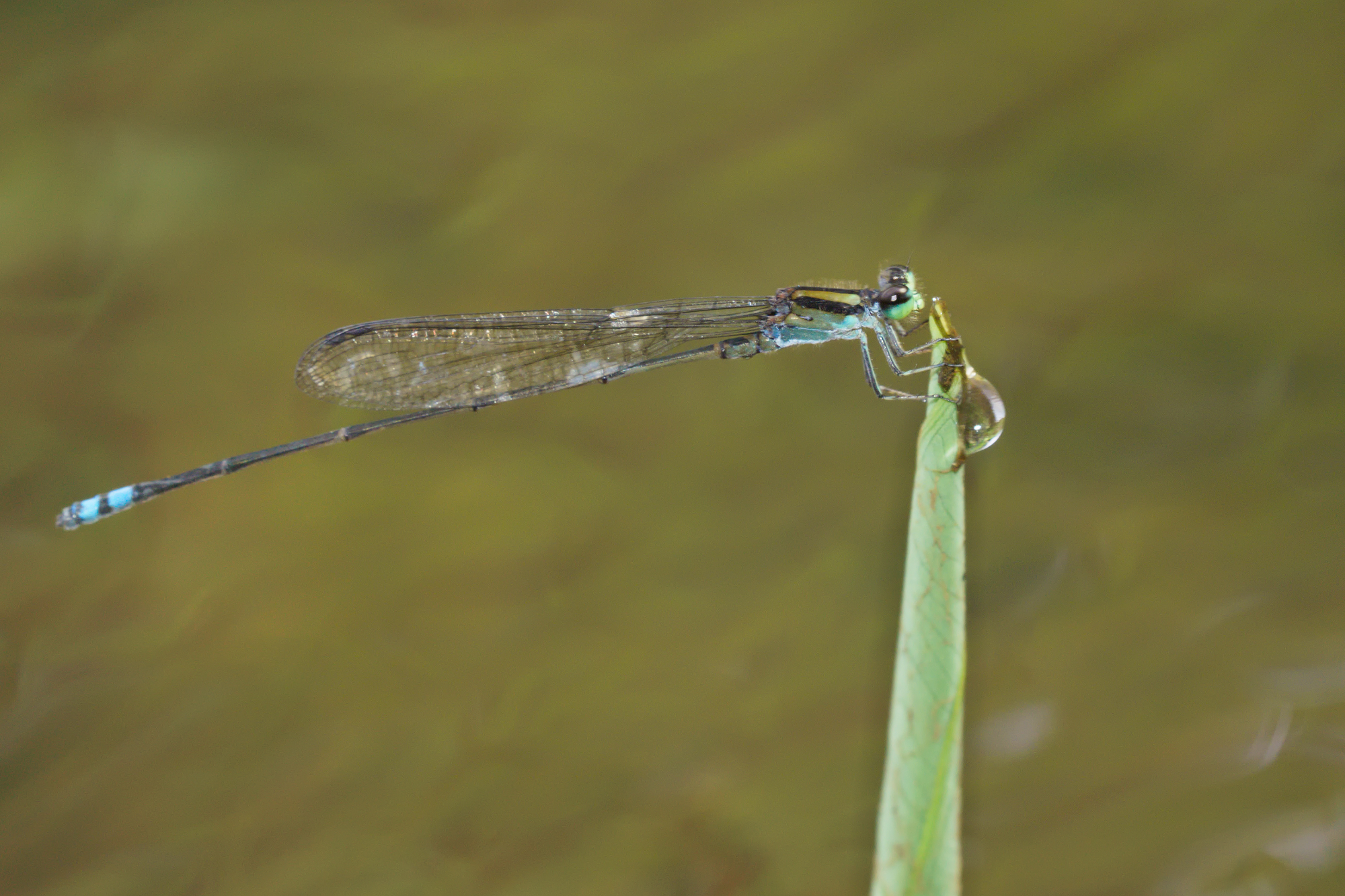
- male
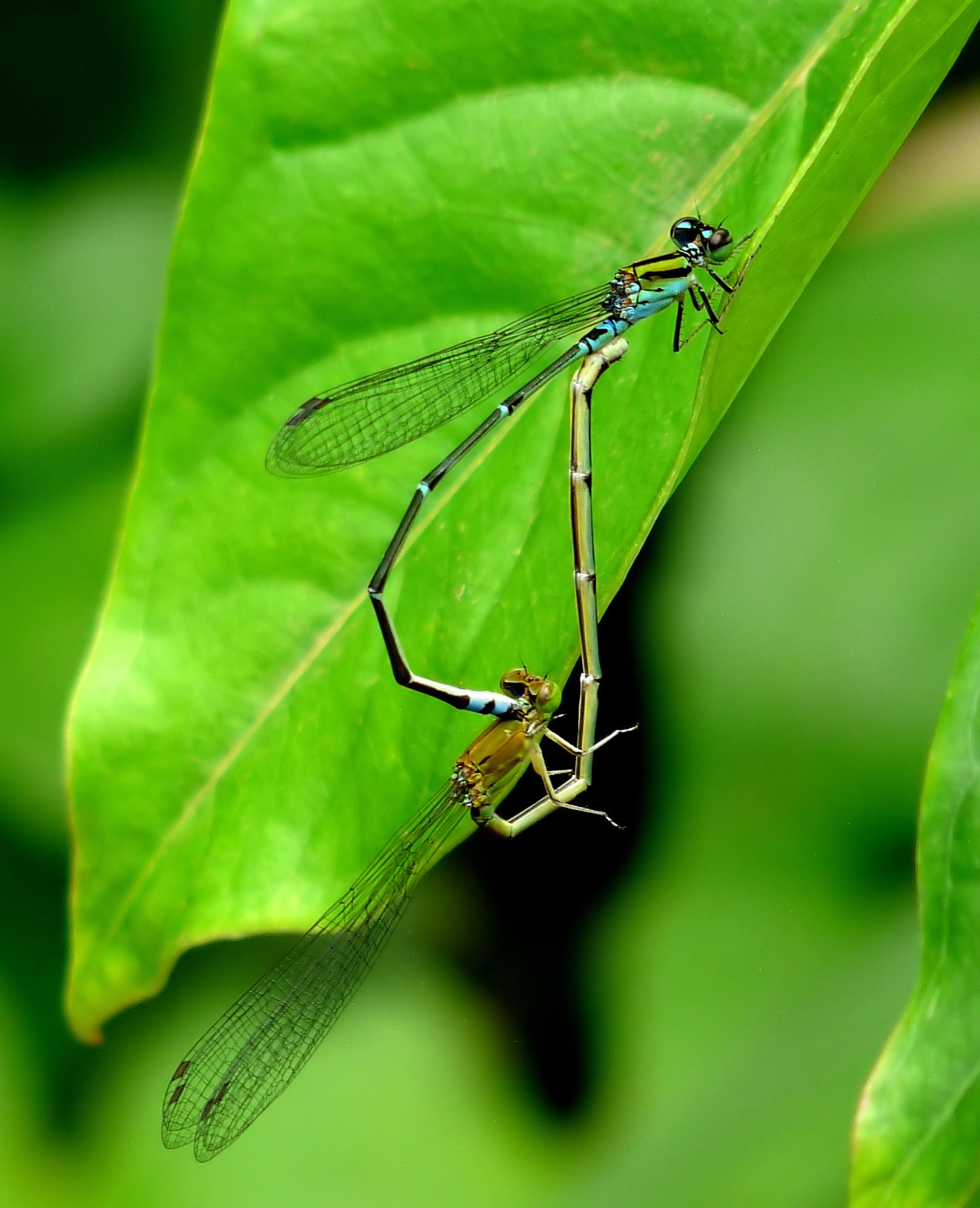
- mating pair

Conservation status
- Least Concern (IUCN 3.1)

Scientific classification
- Kingdom: Animalia
- Phylum: Arthropoda
- Clade: Pancrustacea
- Class: Insecta
- Order: Odonata
- Suborder: Zygoptera
- Family: Coenagrionidae
- Genus: Pseudagrion
- Species: P. indicum

Binomial name
- Pseudagrion indicum Fraser, 1924

= Pseudagrion indicum =

Species of damselfly

Pseudagrion indicum, yellow-striped blue dart or yellow-striped dart, is a species of damselfly in the family Coenagrionidae. It is found only in Western Ghats of India.

== Description and habitat ==
It is a medium sized damselfly with black-capped greenish eyes. Its thorax is black on dorsum with black humeral stripes; the area between them is pale green. The lateral sides are azure blue. Abdominal segments 1 and 2 are azure blue with black marks on the dorsum. Mark on segment 2 looks like a chalice or thistle-head. Segments 3 to 7 are black on dorsum and pale green on the sides. Segments 8 and 9 are azure blue with black apical annules. Segment 10 is black.

Female has yellowish green thorax and green eyes capped with yellowish green. Color of the abdomen is similar to the male; but paler. Segments 8 and 9 are also black with fine apical blue rings. Segment 10 is blue.

It breeds in small streams and associated marshes in sub-montane and montane areas of the Western Ghats.

== See also ==
- List of odonates of India
- List of odonata of Kerala
