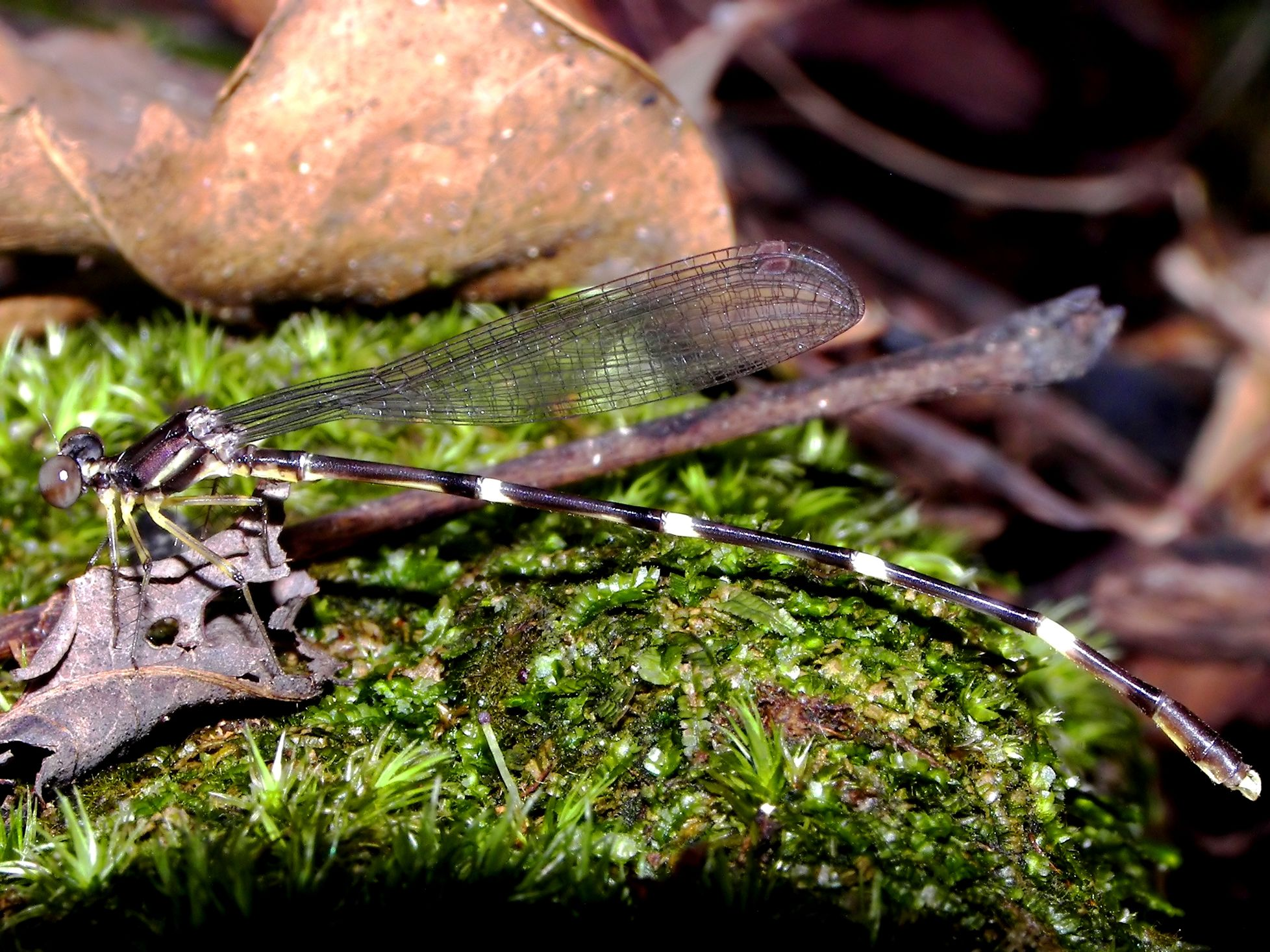
- Protosticta taipokauensis

Scientific classification
- Kingdom: Animalia
- Phylum: Arthropoda
- Clade: Pancrustacea
- Class: Insecta
- Order: Odonata
- Suborder: Zygoptera
- Family: Platystictidae
- Subfamily: Protostictinae
- Genus: Protosticta; Selys, 1885

= Protosticta =

Genus of damselflies

Protosticta is a genus of shadowdamsels in the damselfly family Platystictidae, and subfamily Protostictinae. There are more than 50 described species in Protosticta.

== Species ==
These 58 species belong to the genus Protosticta:

- Protosticta anamalaica Sadasivan, Nair & Samuel, 2022
- Protosticta antelopoides Fraser, 1931
- Protosticta armageddonia Chandran, Payra, Deshpande & Koparde, 2023
- Protosticta beaumonti Wilson, 1997
- Protosticta binhi Phan, To, Trinh & Dinh, 2019
- Protosticta bivittata Lieftinck, 1939
- Protosticta caroli van Tol, 2008
- Protosticta coomansi van Tol, 2000
- Protosticta cyanofemora Joshi, Subramanian, Babu & Kunte, 2020
- Protosticta damacornu Terzani & Carletti, 1998
- Protosticta davenporti Fraser, 1931
- Protosticta foersteri Laidlaw, 1902
- Protosticta francyi Sadivan, Vibhu, Nair & Palot in Vibhu et al., 2022
- Protosticta fraseri Kennedy, 1936
- Protosticta geijskesi van Tol, 2000
- Protosticta gracilis Kirby, 1889
- Protosticta grandis Asahina, 1985
- Protosticta gravelyi Laidlaw, 1915
- Protosticta hearseyi Fraser, 1922
- Protosticta himalaiaca Laidlaw, 1917
- Protosticta himalaica Laidlaw, 1917
- Protosticta joepani Dow, Phan & Choong, 2020
- Protosticta khaosoidaoensis Asahina, 1984
- Protosticta khasia Joshi & Sarkar, 2024
- Protosticta kiautai Zhou, 1986
- Protosticta kinabaluensis Laidlaw, 1915
- Protosticta lepteca van Tol, 2005
- Protosticta linduensis van Tol, 2000
- Protosticta linnaei van Tol, 2008
- Protosticta marenae van Tol, 2000
- Protosticta maurenbrecheri van Tol, 2000
- Protosticta medusa Fraser, 1934
- Protosticta monticola Emiliyamma & Palot, 2016
- Protosticta mortoni Fraser, 1924
- Protosticta myristicaensis Joshi & Kunte, 2020
- Protosticta ngoai Phan & Kompier, 2016
- Protosticta nigra Kompier, 2017
- Protosticta pariwonoi van Tol, 2000
- Protosticta plicata van Tol, 2005
- Protosticta ponmudiensis Kiran, Kalesh & Kunte, 2015
- Protosticta proboscis Kompier, 2016
- Protosticta pseudocuriosa Phan & Kompier, 2016
- Protosticta reslae van Tol, 2000
- Protosticta robusta Fraser, 1933
- Protosticta rozendalorum van Tol, 2000
- Protosticta rufostigma Kimmins, 1958
- Protosticta samtsensis Gurung & Phan, 2023
- Protosticta sanguinostigma Fraser, 1922
- Protosticta satoi Asahina, 1997
- Protosticta sholai Subramanian & Babu, 2020
- Protosticta simplicinervis Selys, 1885
- Protosticta socculus Phan & Kompier, 2016
- Protosticta sooryaprakashi Haneef, Chandran, Sawant, Beevi & Kunte, 2025
- Protosticta spinosa Phan & Kompier, 2016
- Protosticta taipokauensis Asahina & Dudgeon, 1987
- Protosticta trilobata Fraser, 1933
- Protosticta uncata Fraser, 1931
- Protosticta vanderstarrei van Tol, 2000
- Protosticta versicolor Laidlaw, 1913
