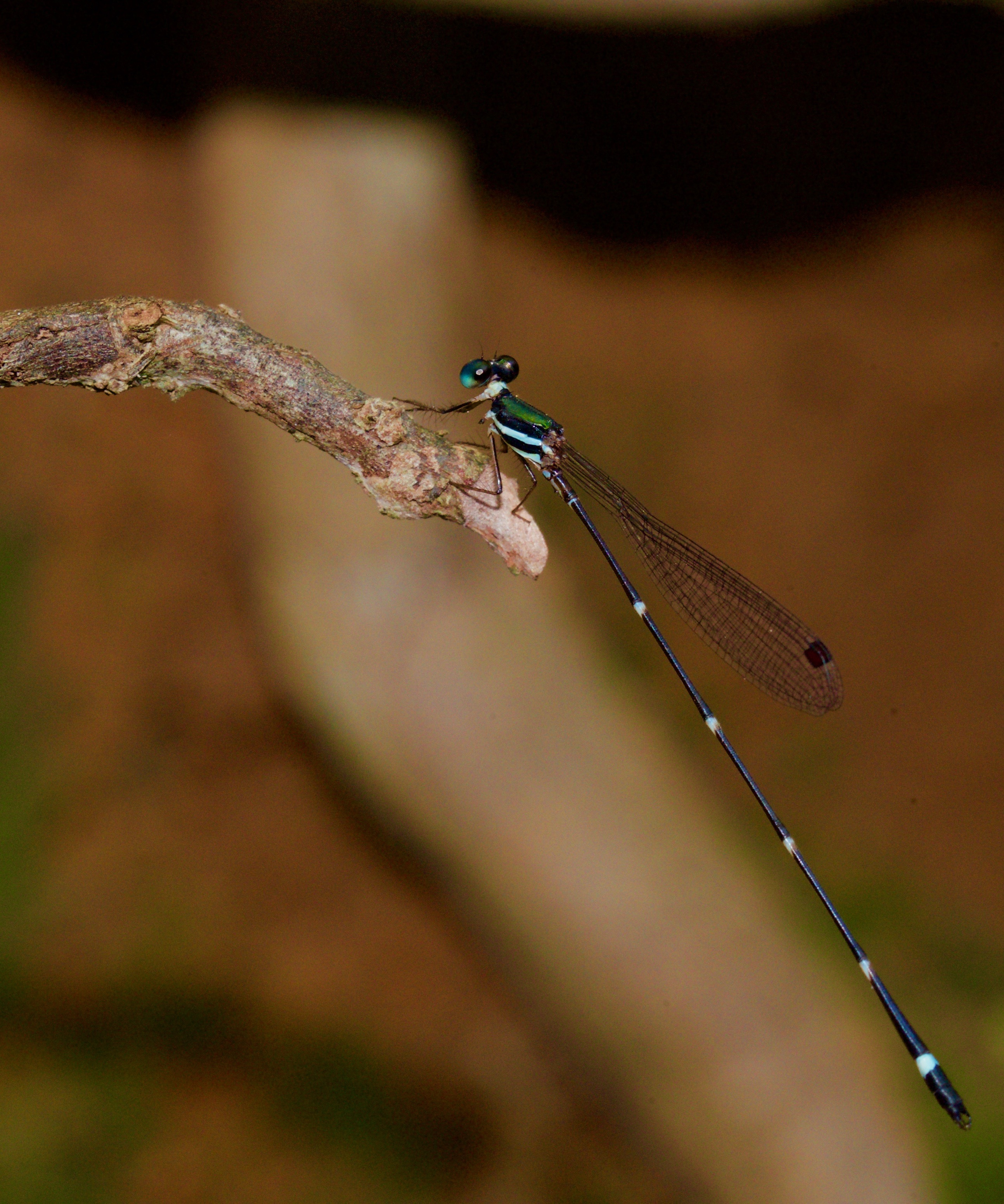
- Male

Conservation status
- Least Concern (IUCN 3.1)

Scientific classification
- Kingdom: Animalia
- Phylum: Arthropoda
- Clade: Pancrustacea
- Class: Insecta
- Order: Odonata
- Suborder: Zygoptera
- Family: Platystictidae
- Genus: Protosticta
- Species: P. davenporti

Binomial name
- Protosticta davenporti Fraser, 1931

= Protosticta davenporti =

Species of damselfly

Protosticta davenporti, the Anamalai reedtail, is a damselfly species in the family Platystictidae. It is endemic to Western Ghats in India.

== Description and habitat ==
It is a large slender damselfly with bottle-green eyes. Its head, prothorax, and thorax are similar to Protosticta gravelyi; but the markings are more bluish. Abdomen is black, with the sides of segments 1 and 2 and the base of 3 bluish-white. Segments 4 to 7 are with narrow white basal annules. Segment 8 has its basal third pale blue. Segments 9 and 10 are without any marks and similar in length of P. gravelyi. The shape of the anal appendages will serve to distinguish this species from all other Protosticta species.

It is relatively common in hill streams of southern Western Ghats, south of the Palakkad Gap. It is found in forest streams with good riparian cover. It flies close to the ground and rests among riparian vegetation.

== See also ==
- List of odonates of India
- List of odonata of Kerala
