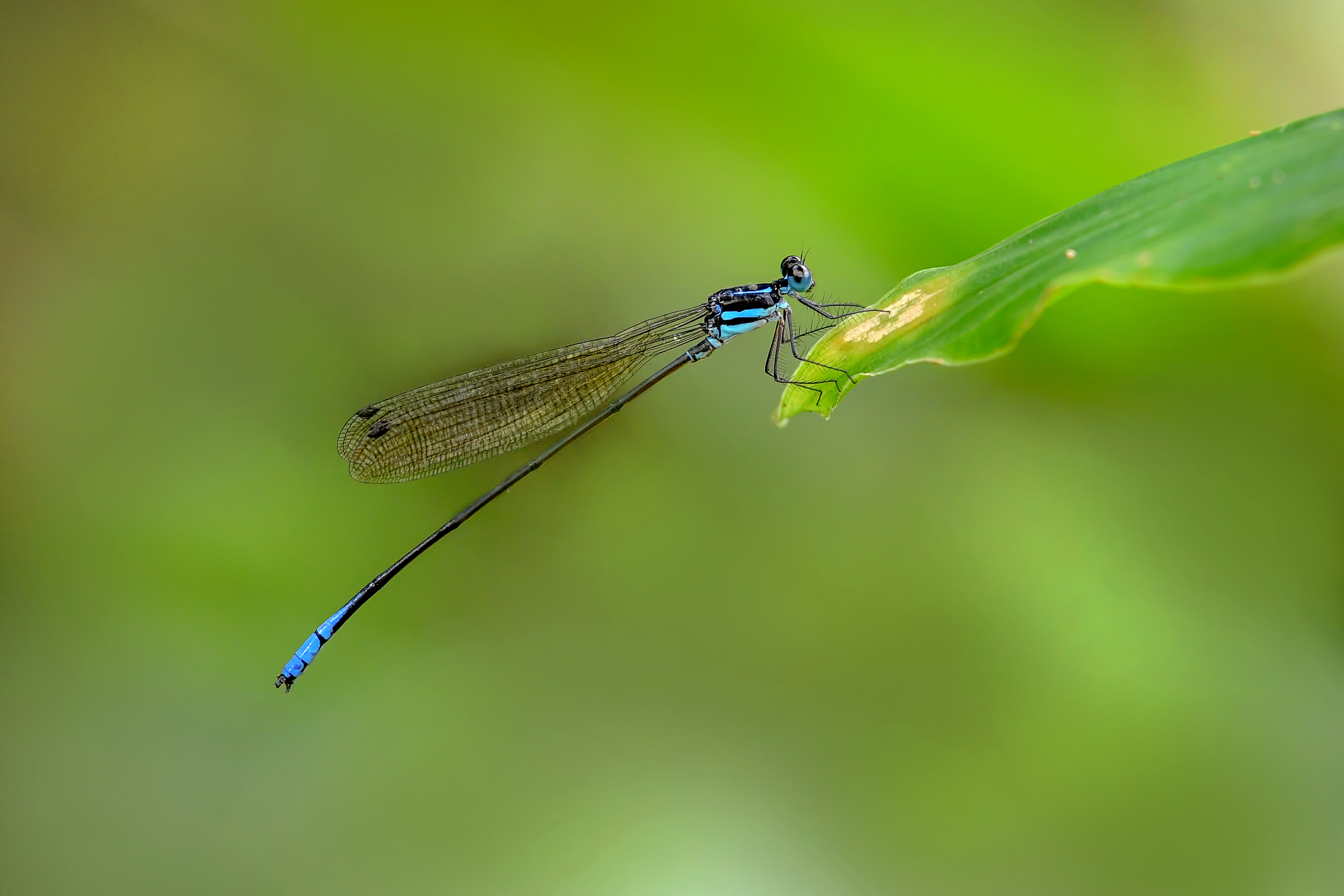
- Male

Scientific classification
- Kingdom: Animalia
- Phylum: Arthropoda
- Class: Insecta
- Order: Odonata
- Suborder: Zygoptera
- Family: Platycnemididae
- Genus: Phylloneura
- Species: P. rupestris

Binomial name
- Phylloneura rupestris Chandran, Chandran and Jose, 2024

= Phylloneura rupestris =

Species of damselfly

Phylloneura rupestris is a species of damselfly endemic to the Western Ghats region of India. Its common name is cliffside bambootail.

== Description ==
Male Phylloneura rupestris can be distinguished from P. westermanni by extensive blue markings on the seventh abdominal segments, while females have a distinct apical blue ring on seventh abdominal segments. Male specimens also differ in thicker cerci and rounded tips of paraprocts. Range overlap is absent between the two species.

== Range ==
Phylloneura rupestris is currently only from the type locality (Ponmudi Hills, southern Western Ghats), but it could be present in similar habitats (seasonal streams flowing over rocky cliffs at mid-altitudes) in the Agasthyamalai Hills, as these form a continuous chain of forested hills in the southern Western Ghats.

== Habitat and ecology ==
In the type locality, a population of 30 individuals of Phylloneura rupestris was seen perched on vegetation around a steep rocky cliff over which rills of a seasonal stream flowed. The sky was overcast and there was light drizzle. Most of the observed individuals were males, and females were seen only while mating. They occasionally made short, slow flights, probably chasing flying insect prey, before returning to their perches.

== Reproduction ==
In observed instances of reproductive behavior, oviposition was witnessed in six pairs of Phylloneura rupestris. The sequence of events unfolded as follows: the male descended slowly from its perch, dipped its abdomen in the water, then returned to catch a female in tandem. Intra-male sperm translocation followed, then the pair flew around before descending for oviposition. The female laid eggs on submerged moss mats twice, with the male in tandem. Following these oviposition events, the pair perched on streamside vegetation before separating. The entire reproductive activity spanned approximately 15.51 minutes.

== Etymology ==
The species epithet "rupestris" is derived from Latin and signifies "that lives on cliffs or rocks", in reference to the habitat predilection of Phylloneura rupestris.
