= Protosticta sooryaprakashi =

Scientific classification
- Kingdom: Animalia
- Phylum: Arthropoda
- Clade: Pancrustacea
- Class: Insecta
- Order: Odonata
- Suborder: Zygoptera
- Family: Platystictidae
- Genus: Protosticta
- Species: P. sooryaprakashi

Binomial name
- Protosticta sooryaprakashi Haneef, Chandran, Sawant, Beevi & Kunte, 2025

Species of damselfly

Protosticta sooryaprakashi, known as the Kodagu shadowdamsel, is a species of damselfly described from India in 2025.

== Range ==
P. sooryaprakashi is only found in Karnataka, India.

== Habitat ==
Type specimens were observed in areca nut plantations and adjacent areas along the banks of a River.

== Etymology ==
The species epithet sooryaprakashi is a Latinised noun of Sooryaprakash in genitive case, honouring Sooryaprakash Shenoy. He was an eminent botanist and the Head Scientist of the Botany Division at the Dr. Shivaram Karanth Nisargadhama (biological park) in Pilikula, Karnataka, India. He is widely regarded for his dedicated efforts towards biodiversity conservation in the Western Ghats.
