= Protosticta anamalaica =

Scientific classification
- Domain: Eukaryota
- Kingdom: Animalia
- Phylum: Arthropoda
- Class: Insecta
- Order: Odonata
- Suborder: Zygoptera
- Family: Platystictidae
- Genus: Protosticta
- Species: P. anamalaica

Binomial name
- Protosticta anamalaica Sadasivan, Nair & Samuel, 2022

Species of insect

Protosticta anamalaica, the Anamalai reedtail, is a species of insect in the suborder Zygoptera, the damselflies. It is endemic to the Western Ghats mountain range region of India. P. anamalica typically lives in 950 meter (3116 feet) mid elevation semi-evergreen forest. The species has several pale yellow stripes on its abdomen and a dark brown pterostigma. The species was described in the year 2022 by Sadasivan, Nair and Samuel.
