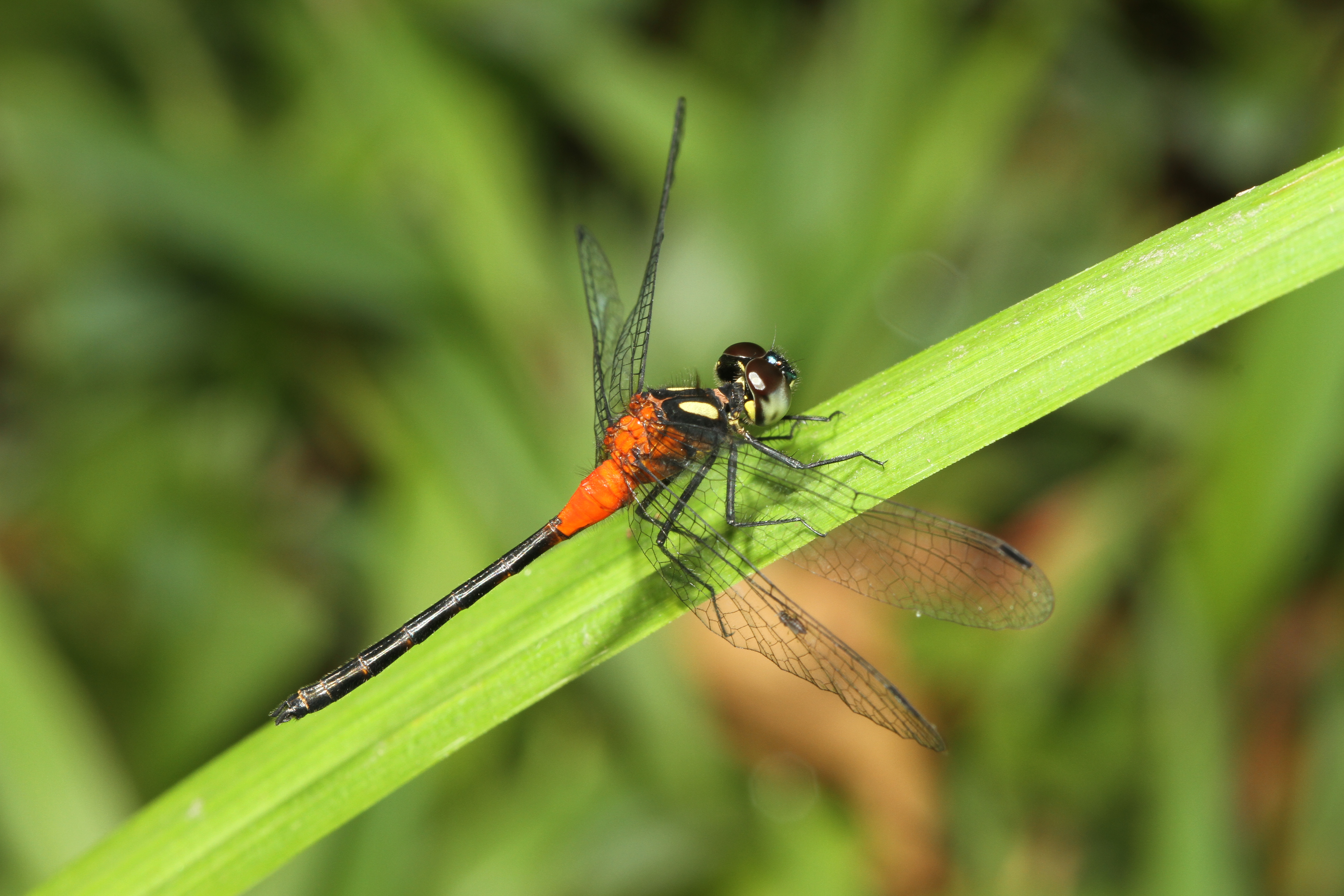
- Male
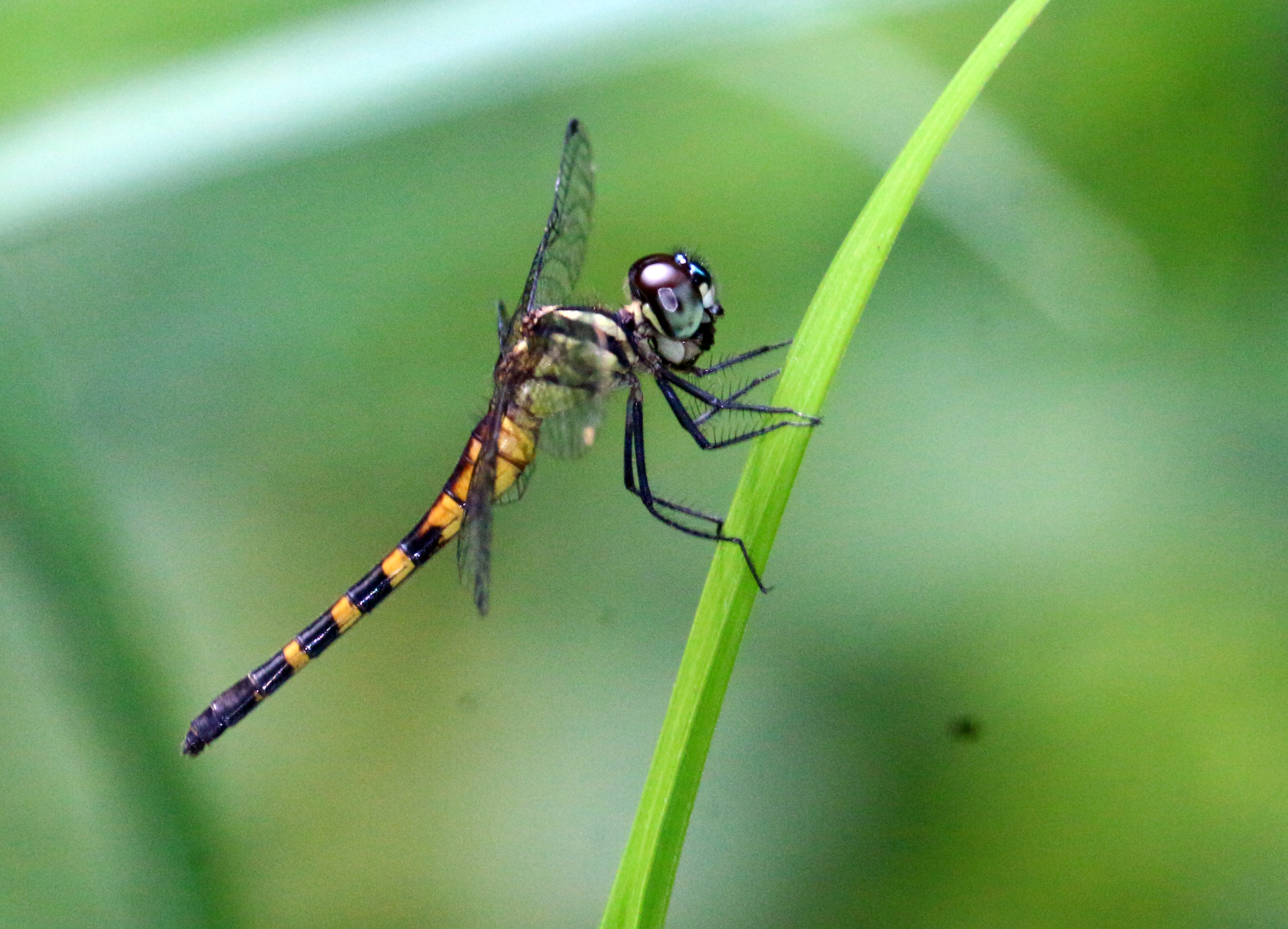
- Female

Conservation status
- Least Concern (IUCN 3.1)

Scientific classification
- Kingdom: Animalia
- Phylum: Arthropoda
- Clade: Pancrustacea
- Class: Insecta
- Order: Odonata
- Infraorder: Anisoptera
- Superfamily: Libelluloidea
- Family: Libellulidae
- Genus: Epithemis
- Species: E. mariae

Binomial name
- Epithemis mariae (Laidlaw, 1915)

Synonyms
- Amphithemis mariae Laidlaw, 1915

= Epithemis mariae =

Species of dragonfly

Epithemis mariae is a species of dragonfly in the family Libellulidae known commonly as the rubytailed hawklet. It is endemic to the Western Ghats, India. The species is found in small colonies closely associated with forested marshes.

== Description and habitat ==
It is a small dragonfly having black pro-thorax and thorax with a broad greenish yellow humeral stripe on either side. Segments 1-3 of the abdomen are brick-red, the remaining segments are black; segments 4-7 have a basal yellow ring. Female is golden yellow with black markings.

This species occurs in small colonies in bogs at the foot of the hills where it breeds.

== See also ==
- List of odonates of India
- List of odonata of Kerala
