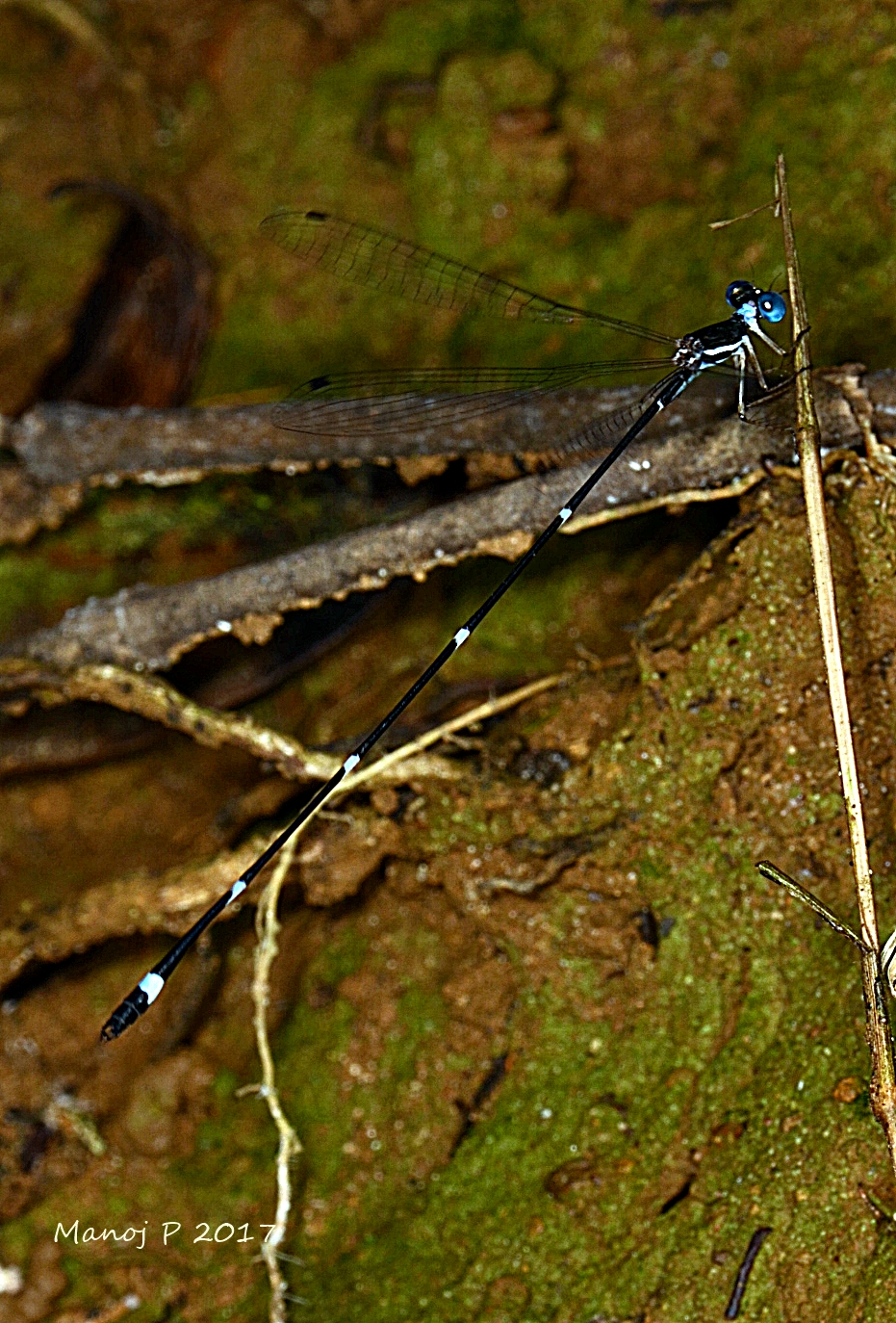
- Male, Wayanad, Kerala

Conservation status
- Data Deficient (IUCN 3.1)

Scientific classification
- Kingdom: Animalia
- Phylum: Arthropoda
- Clade: Pancrustacea
- Class: Insecta
- Order: Odonata
- Suborder: Zygoptera
- Family: Platystictidae
- Genus: Protosticta
- Species: P. hearseyi

Binomial name
- Protosticta hearseyi Fraser, 1922

= Protosticta hearseyi =

Species of damselfly

Protosticta hearseyi, the little reedtail, is a damselfly species in the family Platystictidae. It is endemic to Western Ghats in India.

== Description and habitat ==
It is a small slender damselfly with blue eyes. Its thorax is copper-brown on the dorsum and pale blue laterally. There is a broad black stripe on the postero-lateral suture and anterior part of metepimeron. Abdomen is copper-brown, marked with pale blue. segments 1 and 2 are bluish-white on the sides. Segments 3 to 7 have narrow basal annules extending more broadly along the sides. Segment 8 is turquoise-blue, with a narrow black apical annule. Segments 9 and 10 are black. The small size of the species and its copper-brown colours will help to identify it from all other species in the same genus. It is the only species in which the two sexes are approximately of the same length.

It is known to occur in first order streams with good riparian forest cover.

== See also ==
- List of odonates of India
- List of odonata of Kerala
