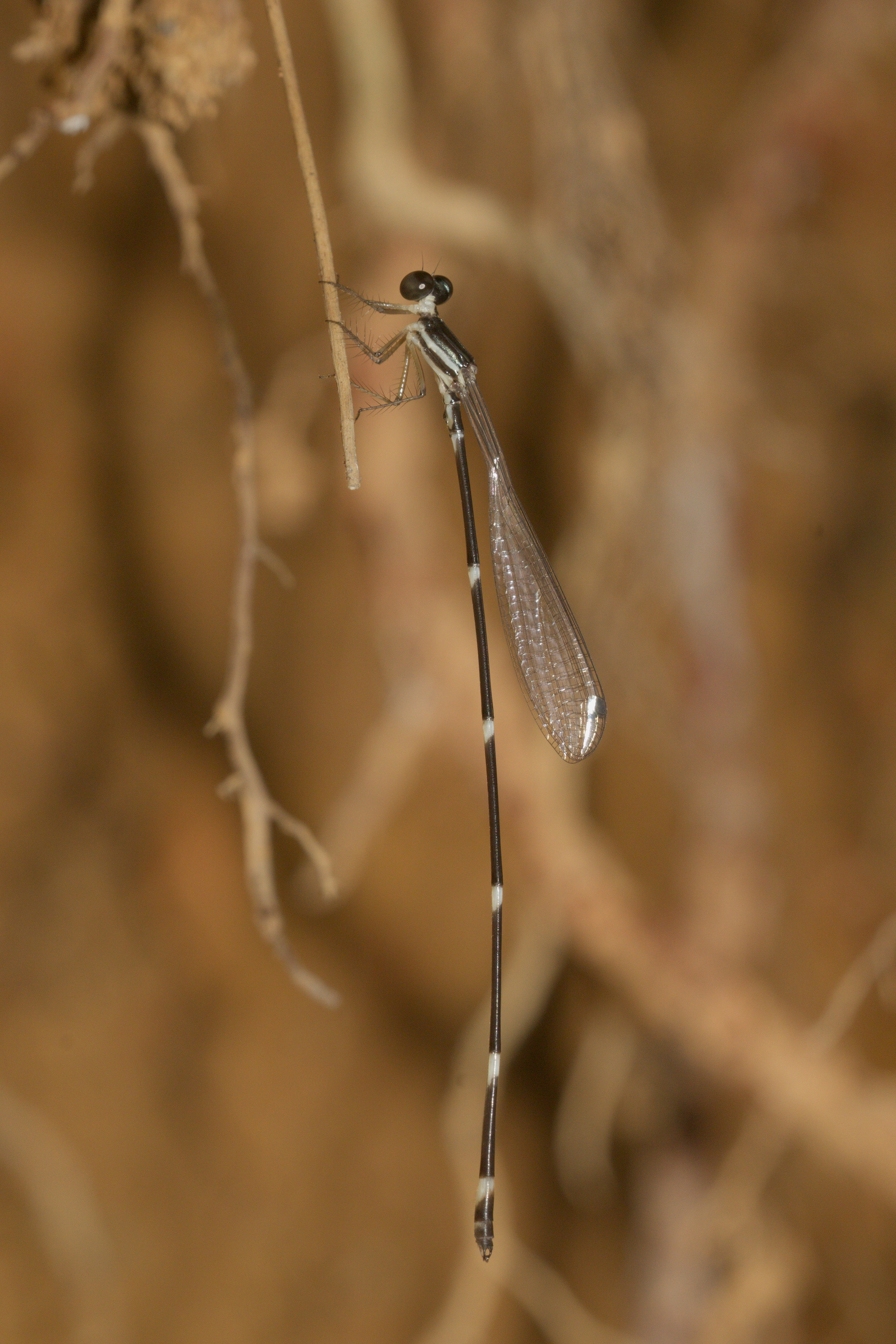
- Male
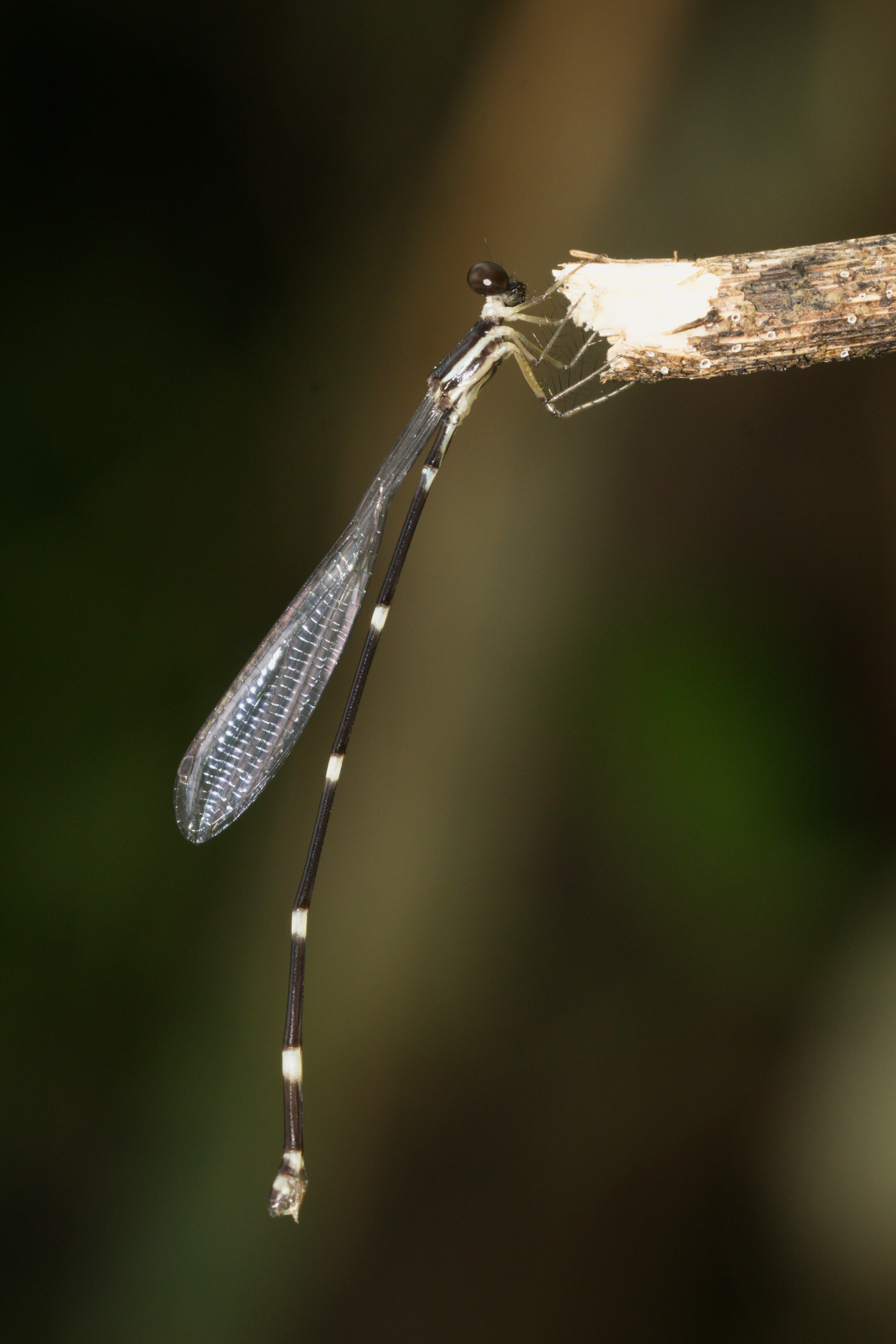
- Female

Conservation status
- Least Concern (IUCN 3.1)

Scientific classification
- Kingdom: Animalia
- Phylum: Arthropoda
- Clade: Pancrustacea
- Class: Insecta
- Order: Odonata
- Suborder: Zygoptera
- Family: Platystictidae
- Genus: Protosticta
- Species: P. gravelyi

Binomial name
- Protosticta gravelyi Laidlaw, 1915

Synonyms
- Protosticta stevensi Fraser, 1922

= Protosticta gravelyi =

Species of damselfly

Protosticta gravelyi, the pied reedtail is a damselfly species in the family Platystictidae. It is endemic to Western Ghats in India. It is very widely distributed in hill streams of Western Ghats from Goa to Agasthyamala hills in Thirunelveli district of South India.

== Description and habitat ==
It is a large slender damselfly with bottle-green eyes. Its thorax is glossy black, marked with a broad, creamy-white stripe on each side. There is a similar stripe on the posterior part of metepimeron. Abdomen is black, marked with white and blue. Segments 1 and 2 are white laterally. Segment 3 is with a narrow basal annule. Segments 4 to 7 are with broad basal annules. Segment 8 is with its basal half turquoise-blue and segments 9 and 10 are unmarked. Anal appendages are black. Female is very similar to the male, but shorter and more robustly built.

It is usually found in first and second order streams with good riparian forest cover. Adults fly very low and rest in riparian vegetation.

== See also ==
- List of odonates of India
- List of odonata of Kerala
