= Tiger tail =

A tiger tail is the tail of a tiger.

Tiger tail may also refer to:

- Tiger Tail (19th century), Seminole leader
- Tiger Tail (play), a 1970 stage play by Tennessee Williams based on his screenplay for Baby Doll
- Tiger tail banding of hair, a symptom of trichothiodystrophy
- Tiger tail donut, a donut that is twisted with another ingredient so that it looks like the tail of a tiger
- Tiger tail ice cream, orange-flavoured ice cream with black licorice swirl
- Tiger Tail Peninsula, a nonexistent land form in southeast Asia found in medieval world maps
- Tiger tail seahorse (Hippocampus comes), a species of fish
- Tiger tail wire, a kind of thin wire encased in nylon
- Tiger Tail, the title of the reissue of jazz saxophonist Stanley Turrentine's album Stan "The Man" Turrentine
- The striped banner below a stop sign

== See also ==
- Tiger by the Tail (disambiguation)
- Tigertail (disambiguation)
- Tiger Tale, a 2002 children's picture book
- Tail of a Tiger, a 1984 Australian film
- The Tiger's Tail, a 2006 Irish film
