= Gomphidia podhigai =

Scientific classification
- Domain: Eukaryota
- Kingdom: Animalia
- Phylum: Arthropoda
- Class: Insecta
- Order: Odonata
- Infraorder: Anisoptera
- Family: Gomphidae
- Genus: Gomphidia
- Species: G. podhigai

Binomial name
- Gomphidia podhigai Babu & Subramanian, 2019

Species of dragonfly

Gomphidia podhigai is a species of dragonfly in the family Gomphidae. It is known only from the Western Ghats of India.

It is described based on a male specimen found in the National Zoological Collections of the Zoological Survey of India in Chennai. It was collected from the Kanyakumari Wildlife Sanctuary in Tamil Nadu. The species epithet podhigai is named after the ancient Tamil name for the Aghastyamalai were the type locality is situated.

== Description and habitat ==
Gomphidia podhigai is similar to other Gomphidia species found in the hill streams of Western Ghats and Sri Lanka in general coloration and markings. However it can be easily distinguished from G. platyceps by the presence of a pair of horns in vertex, from G. pearsoni by the presence of prominent yellow markings in S10, and from G. kodaguensis by the absence of yellow markings in S8–S9.

== See also ==
- List of odonates of India
