= Ictinogomphus dobsoni =

Pilbara tiger

Conservation status
- Near Threatened (IUCN 3.1)

Scientific classification
- Kingdom: Animalia
- Phylum: Arthropoda
- Clade: Pancrustacea
- Class: Insecta
- Order: Odonata
- Suborder: Anisoptera
- Family: Gomphidae
- Genus: Ictinogomphus
- Species: I. dobsoni

Binomial name
- Ictinogomphus dobsoni (Watson, 1969)

Synonyms
- Indictinogomphus australis dobsoni Watson, 1969

Species of dragonfly

Ictinogomphus dobsoni is a species of dragonfly in the family Gomphidae. and known as the Pilbara tiger. It is a medium to large, black dragonfly with yellow markings and clear wings. Ictinogomphus dobsoni is endemic to the Pilbara region in Western Australia, where it inhabits rivers, lakes and ponds.

Ictinogomphus dobsoni appears similar to Ictinogomphus australis.

== Etymology ==
The genus name Ictinogomphus is derived from the Greek ἴκτινος (iktinos, "kite"), combined with Gomphus, a genus name derived from the Greek γόμφος (gomphos, "peg" or "nail"). The name likely refers to the large size of the genus, emphasised by the distinctive large flaps near the end of the abdomen in both males and females.

In 1969, Tony Watson named this species dobsoni, an eponym honouring Roderick Dobson, who collected specimens used in research on this species.

== Gallery ==
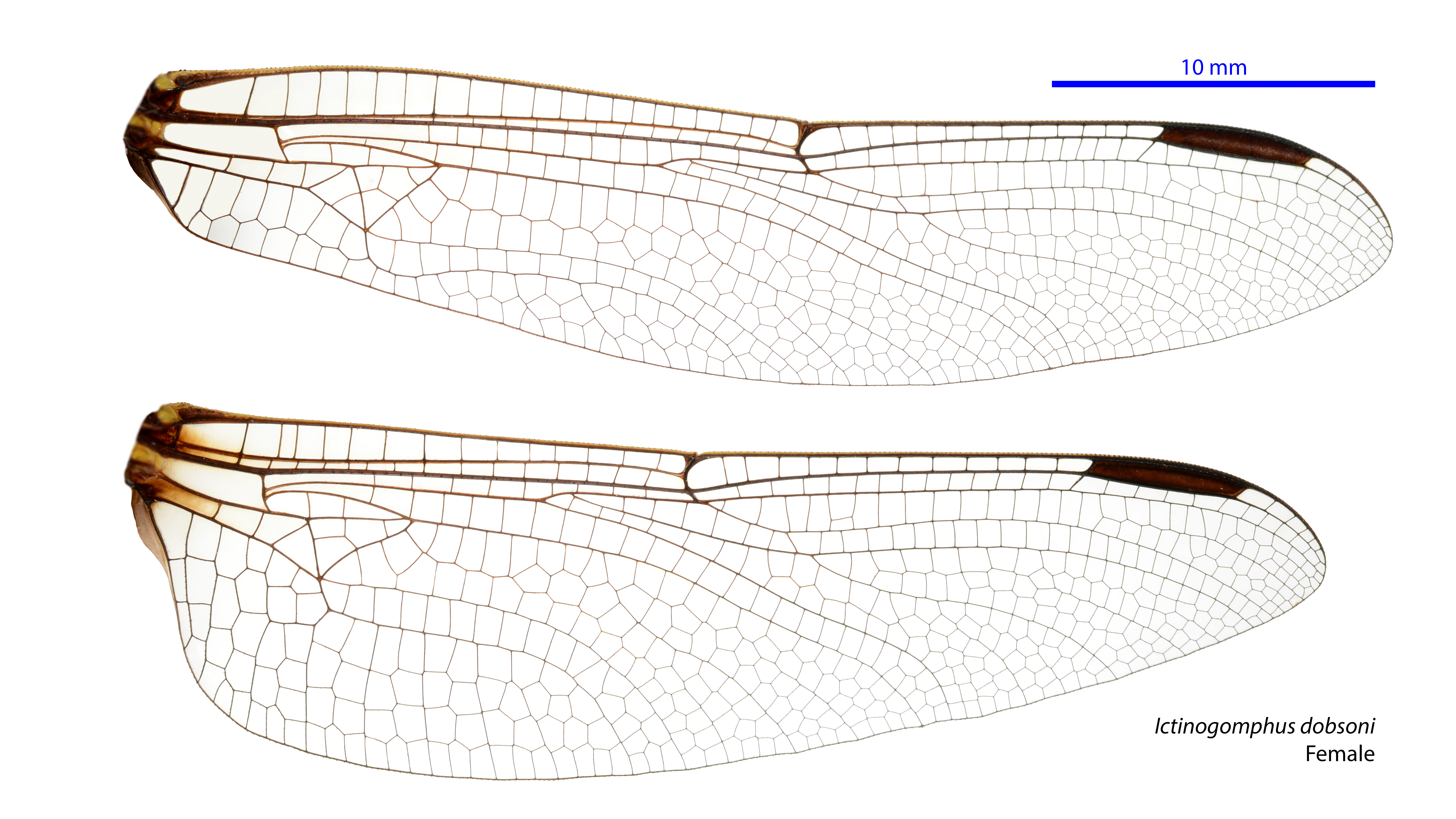
Female wings

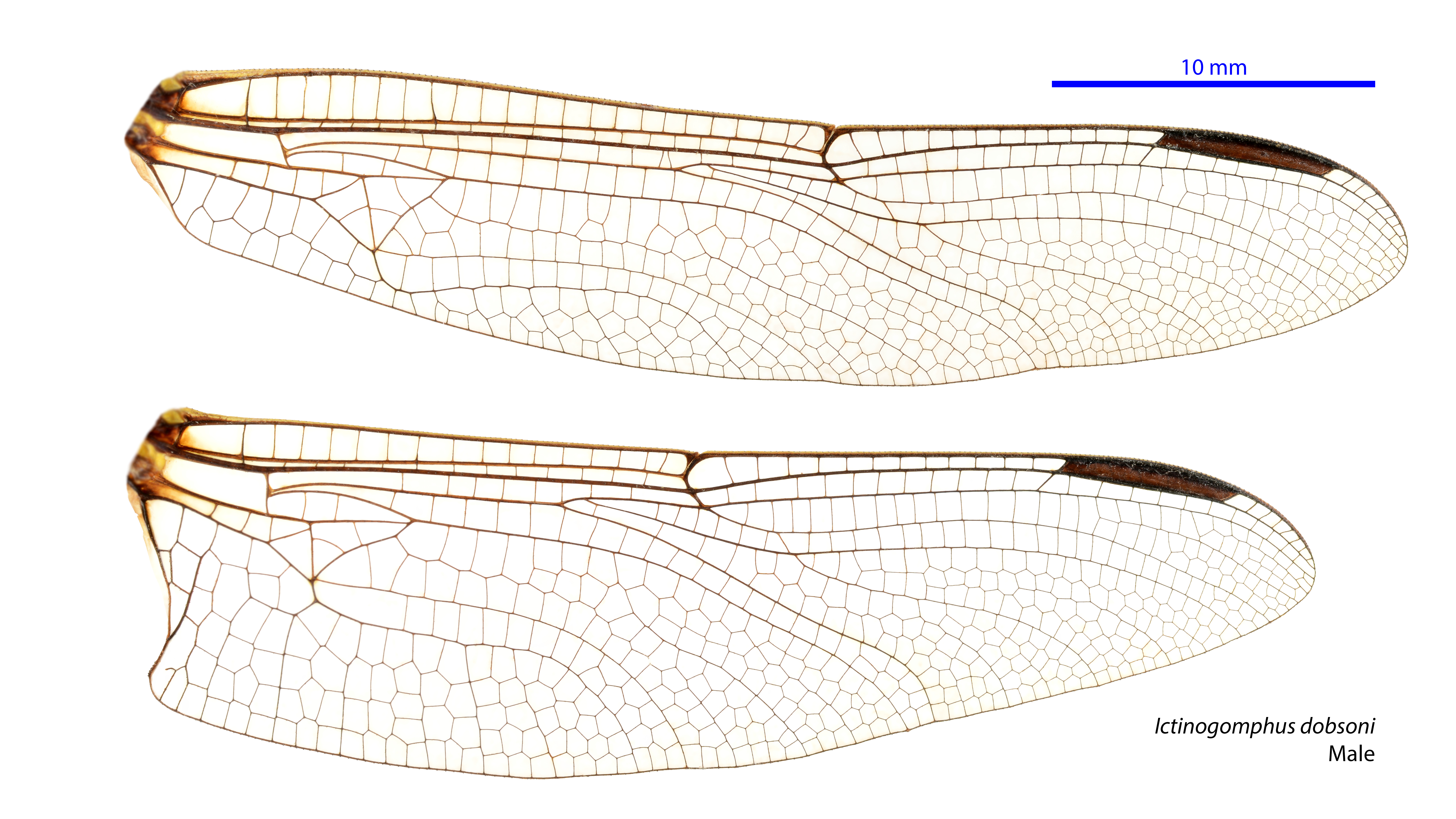
Male wings

== See also ==
- List of Odonata species of Australia
