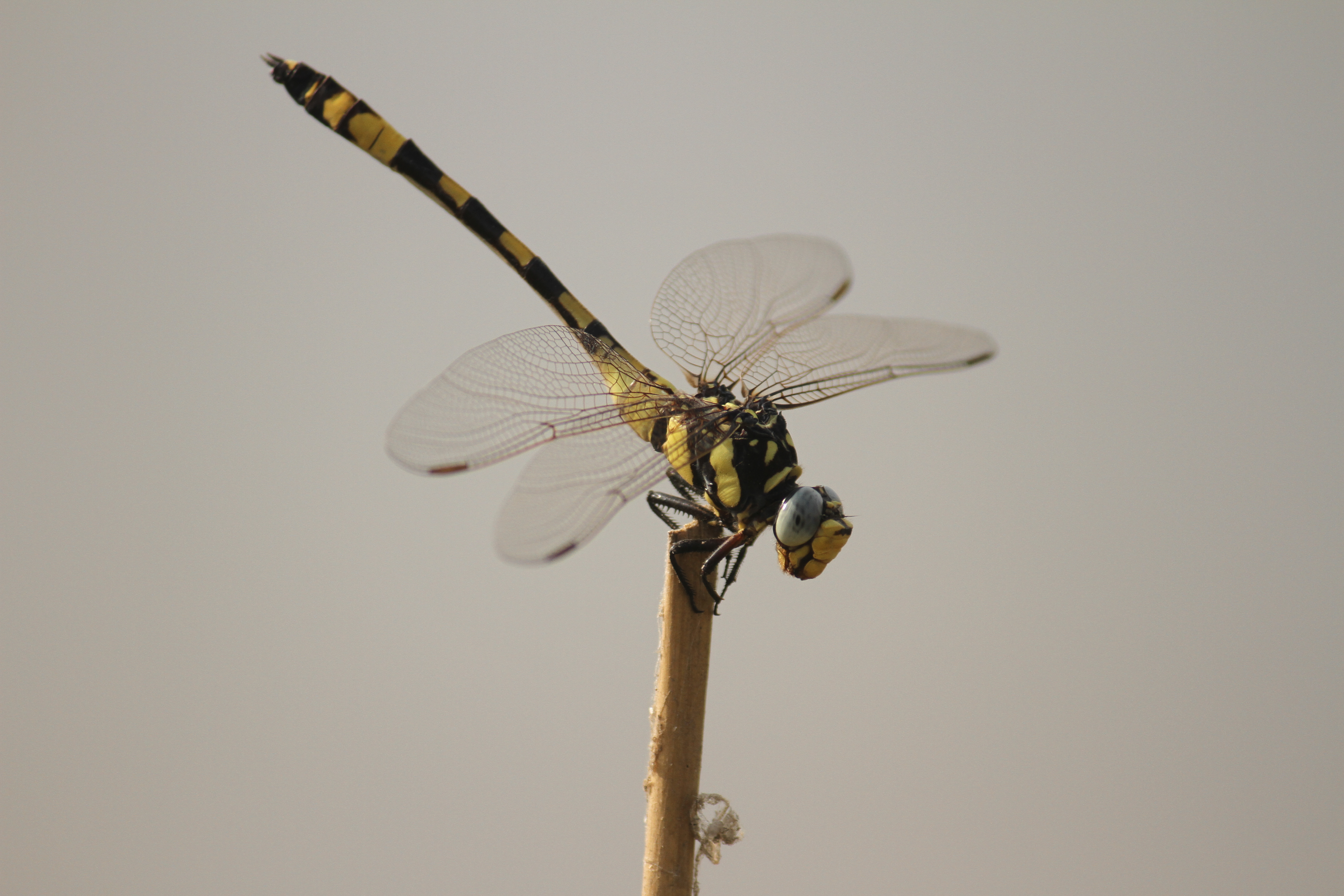
- Male

Conservation status
- Least Concern (IUCN 3.1)

Scientific classification
- Kingdom: Animalia
- Phylum: Arthropoda
- Clade: Pancrustacea
- Class: Insecta
- Order: Odonata
- Suborder: Anisoptera
- Family: Gomphidae
- Genus: Gomphidia
- Species: G. t-nigrum

Binomial name
- Gomphidia t-nigrum Selys, 1854

= Gomphidia t-nigrum =

Species of insect

Gomphidia t-nigrum, the T-marked clubtail or T-marked river clubtail, is a dragonfly (anisoptera) species in the genus Gomphidia and family Gomphidae. It is known from India, Pakistan and Nepal.

== Description ==
Male: Head and thorax: Eyes are bluish-grey; lips, face and frons are bright citron yellow. Upper surface of frons are marked with black line, which forms 'T' mark by meeting another black mark at front frons. Prothorax is brownish-black. Thorax is black and interrupted by a broad yellow mesothoracic collar; two broad, short, dorsal oblique yellow stripes, pointed below and not meeting the mesothoraoie collar; the sides broadly yellow, with a broad median black stripe marked above and below with a small upper and a large inferior spot of yellow. Legs are black. Abdomen: Abdomen is black broadly marked with yellow and segment 7 and 8 with narrow apical rings, which broad at segment 8. Segment 9 with a fine lateral stripe at the base. Anal appendages brownish; superiors are longer than segment 9 and broad at base. Female: very similar to the male. Mandibles marked with black at the base; labrum is all yellow. Anal appendages short, conical, brownish. In the flight both male and female looks like Ictinogomphus, but its bright yellow color is sufficient to distinguish it from Ictinogomphus.

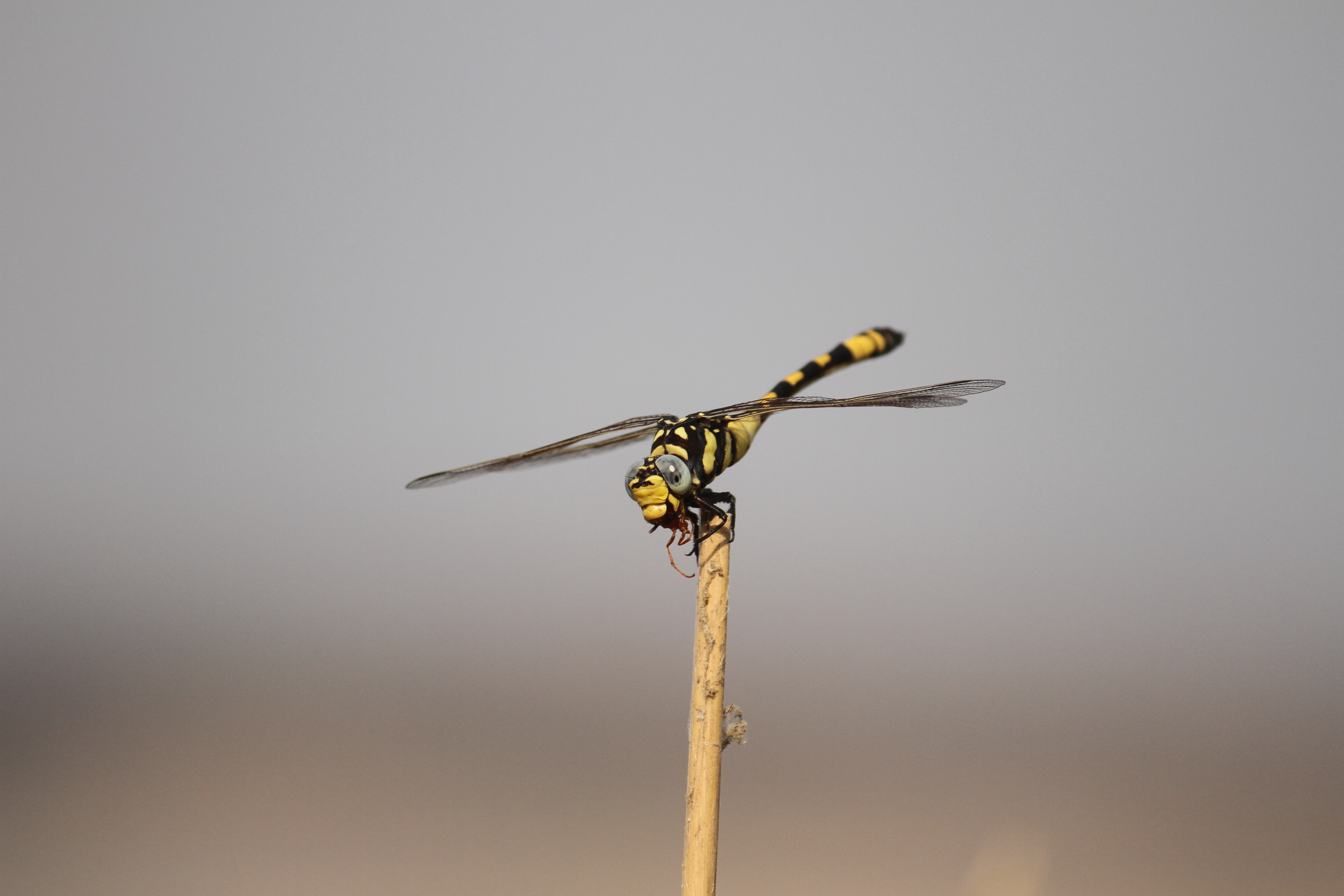
Note the 'T' mark on frons.

== Range and ecology ==
Widespread species throughout Indian subcontinent, but rarely seen. Records from India are known Gopala (Chikkamagaluru district, Karnataka state), Pune (Maharashtra state), Andaman and Nicobar Islands, Assam, Himachal Pradesh, Odisha, Tamil Nadu and Uttar Pradesh. Nymphs were also found from Sindh province of Pakistan and exuviae (remains of exoskeleton) from Phewa Tal lake at Pokhara, Nepal. The species found in lakes, rivers and canals, where the males patrol the lake or river for long distances and combat with other males as they pass.
