= Australian tiger =

Australian tiger may refer to:

- Ictinogomphus australis, a species of clubtail dragonfly in the genus Ictinogomphus
- Thylacine, known as the Australian tiger or Tasmanian tiger
