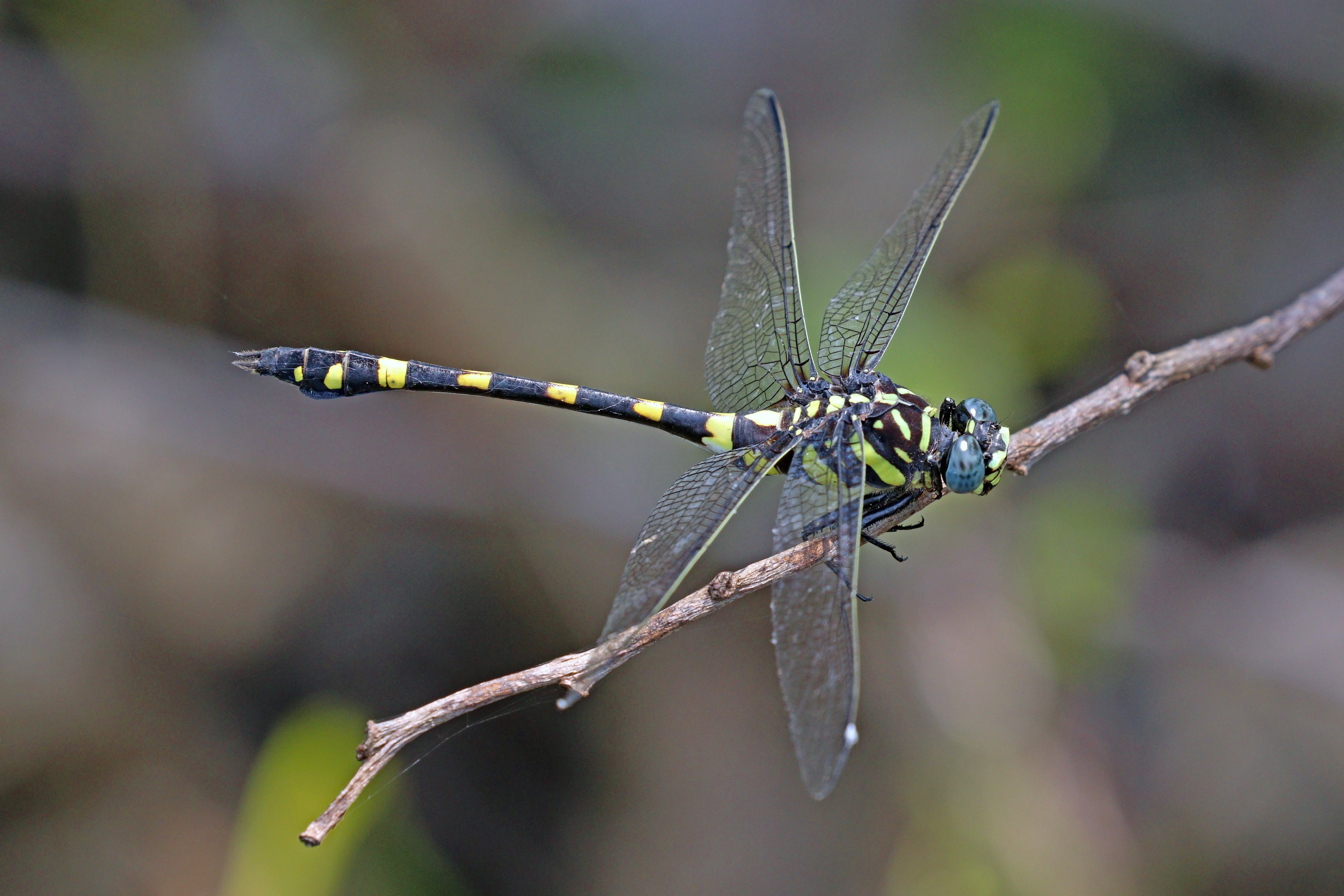
- Male
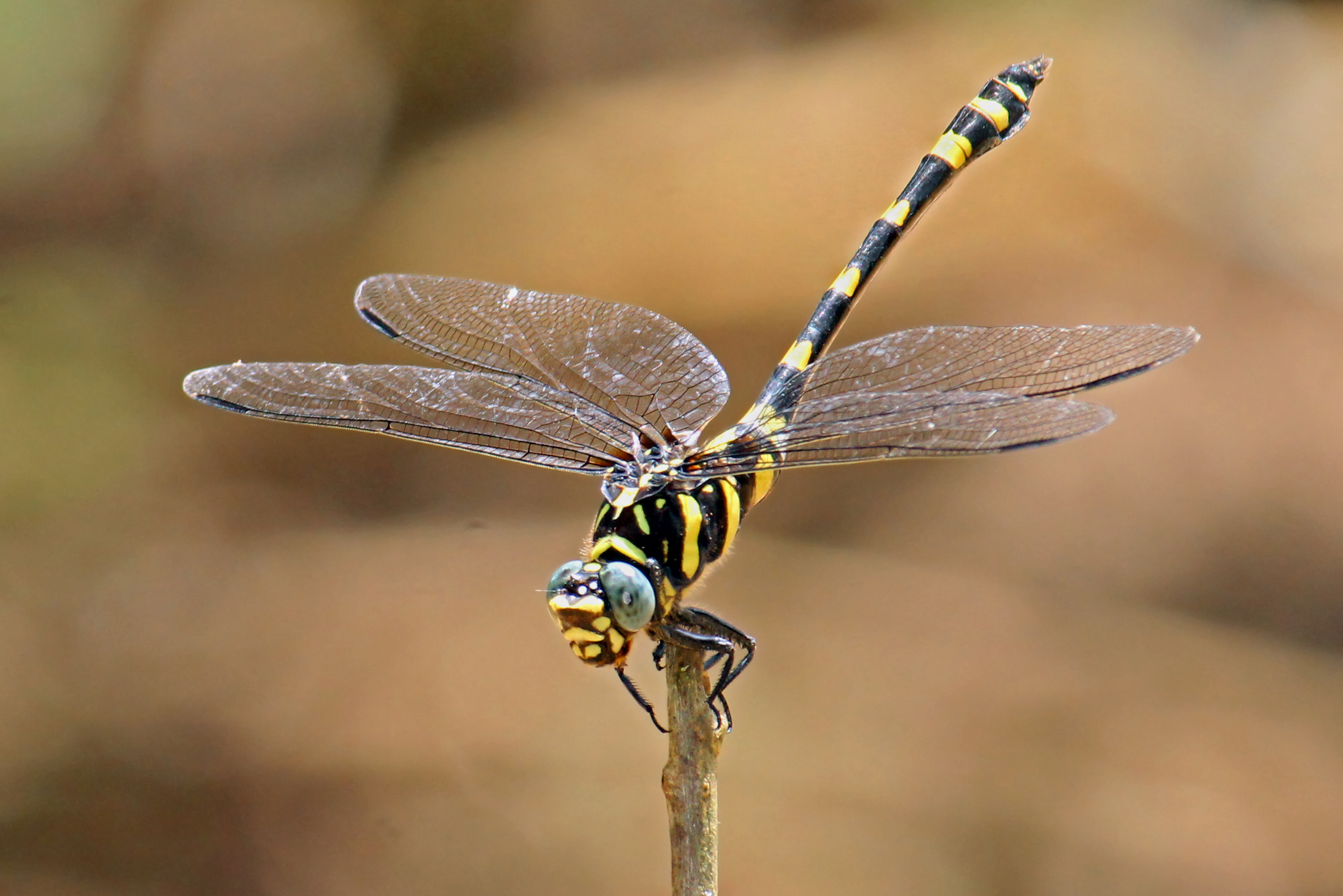
- Female

Conservation status
- Least Concern (IUCN 3.1)

Scientific classification
- Kingdom: Animalia
- Phylum: Arthropoda
- Class: Insecta
- Order: Odonata
- Infraorder: Anisoptera
- Family: Gomphidae
- Genus: Ictinogomphus
- Species: I. rapax

Binomial name
- Ictinogomphus rapax (Rambur, 1842)

Synonyms
- Ictinus mordax Selys, 1857; Ictinus praecox Selys, 1854; Ictinus vorax Rambur, 1842

= Ictinogomphus rapax =

Species of dragonfly

Ictinogomphus rapax, the common clubtail, is a species of dragonfly in the family Gomphidae. It is found throughout the Indomalayan region.

== Description and habitat ==
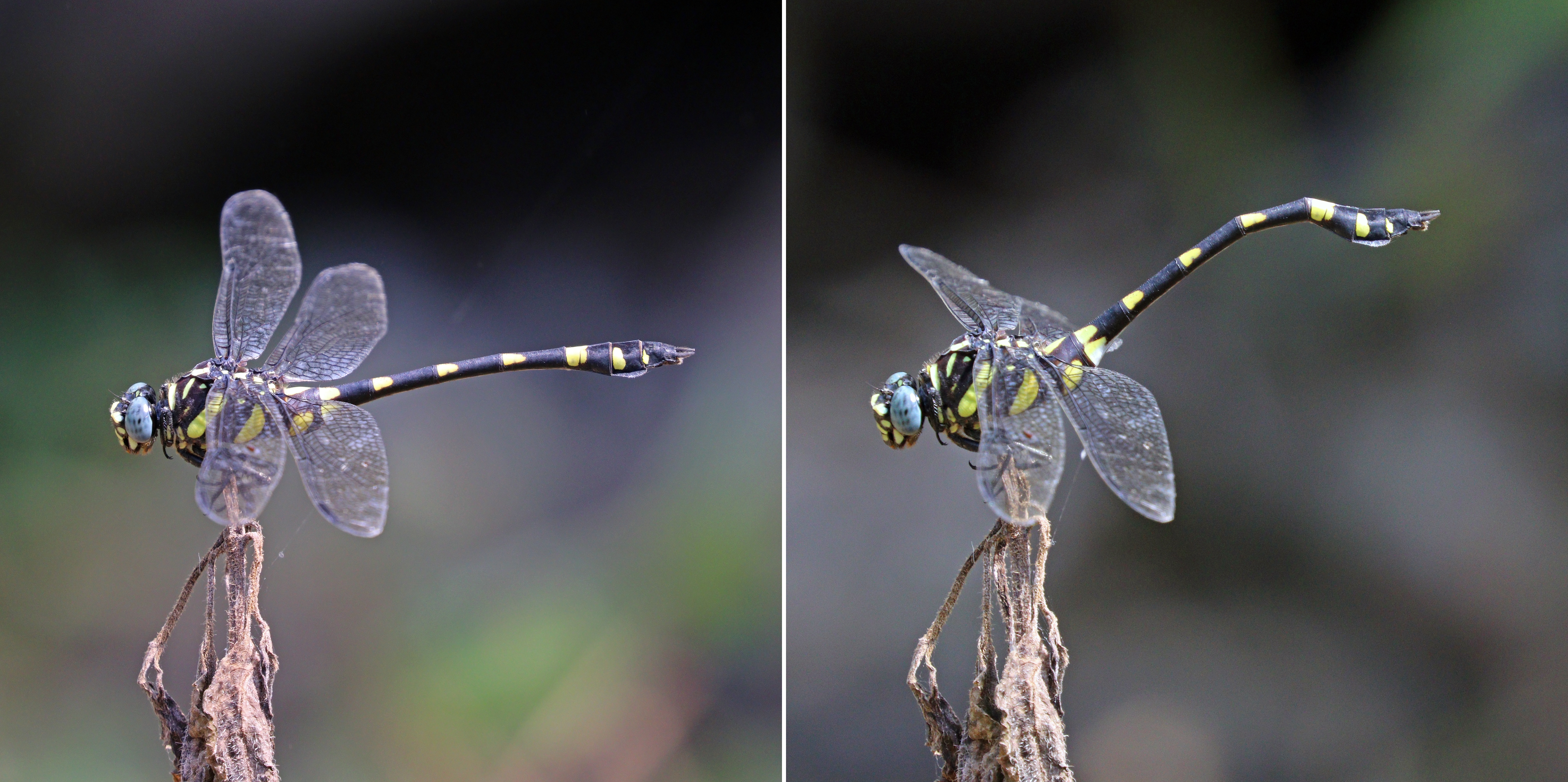
Flexibility of the abdomen

It is a large yellow and black colored dragonfly with bluish-grey eyes. The thorax is black, marked with yellow or greenish-yellow stripes. The abdomen is also black with bright yellow marks. There is a leaf-like expansion in both sides of segment 8.

This species usually perches on a bare twig facing the water, commonly found in ponds, tanks and rivers. It breeds in running and still water.

== See also ==
- List of odonates of India
