= Ictinogomphus paulini =

Cape York tiger

Conservation status
- Data Deficient (IUCN 3.1)

Scientific classification
- Kingdom: Animalia
- Phylum: Arthropoda
- Clade: Pancrustacea
- Class: Insecta
- Order: Odonata
- Suborder: Anisoptera
- Family: Gomphidae
- Genus: Ictinogomphus
- Species: I. paulini

Binomial name
- Ictinogomphus paulini Watson, 1991

Species of dragonfly

Ictinogomphus paulini is a species of dragonfly in the family Gomphidae, known as the Cape York tiger. It is a medium to large, black dragonfly with yellow markings and clear wings. Ictinogomphus paulini is endemic to Cape York, Queensland, Australia, where it inhabits rivers.

== Etymology ==
The genus name Ictinogomphus is derived from the Greek ἴκτινος (iktinos, "kite"), combined with Gomphus, a genus name derived from the Greek γόμφος (gomphos, "peg" or "nail"). The name likely refers to the large size of the genus, emphasised by the distinctive large flaps near the end of the abdomen in both males and females.

In 1969, Tony Watson named this species paulini, an eponym honouring Paulinus of York, the first Archbishop of York, in AD 625.

== Gallery ==
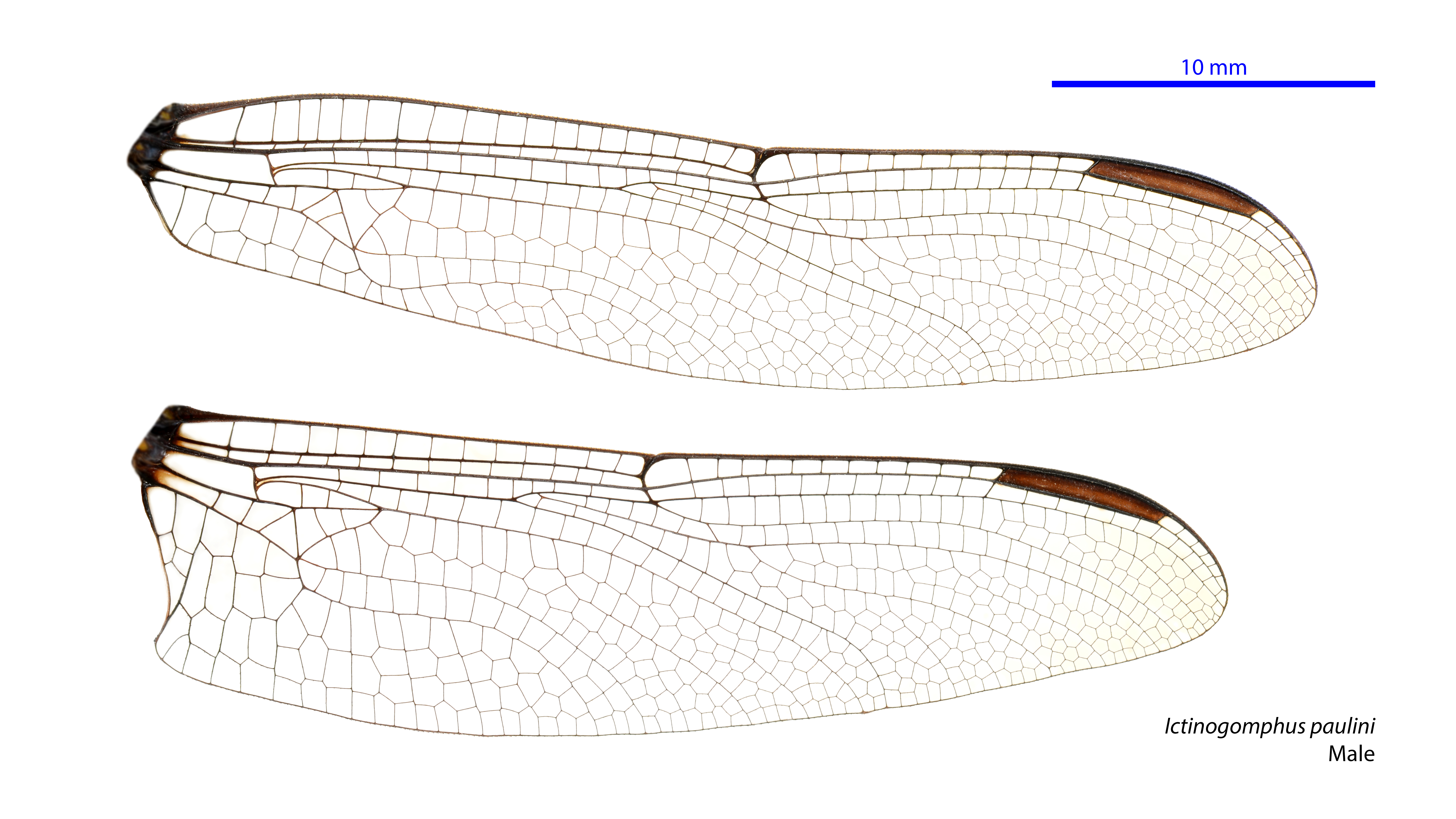
Male wings

== See also ==
- List of Odonata species of Australia
