= Bead stringing =

Method of stringing beads

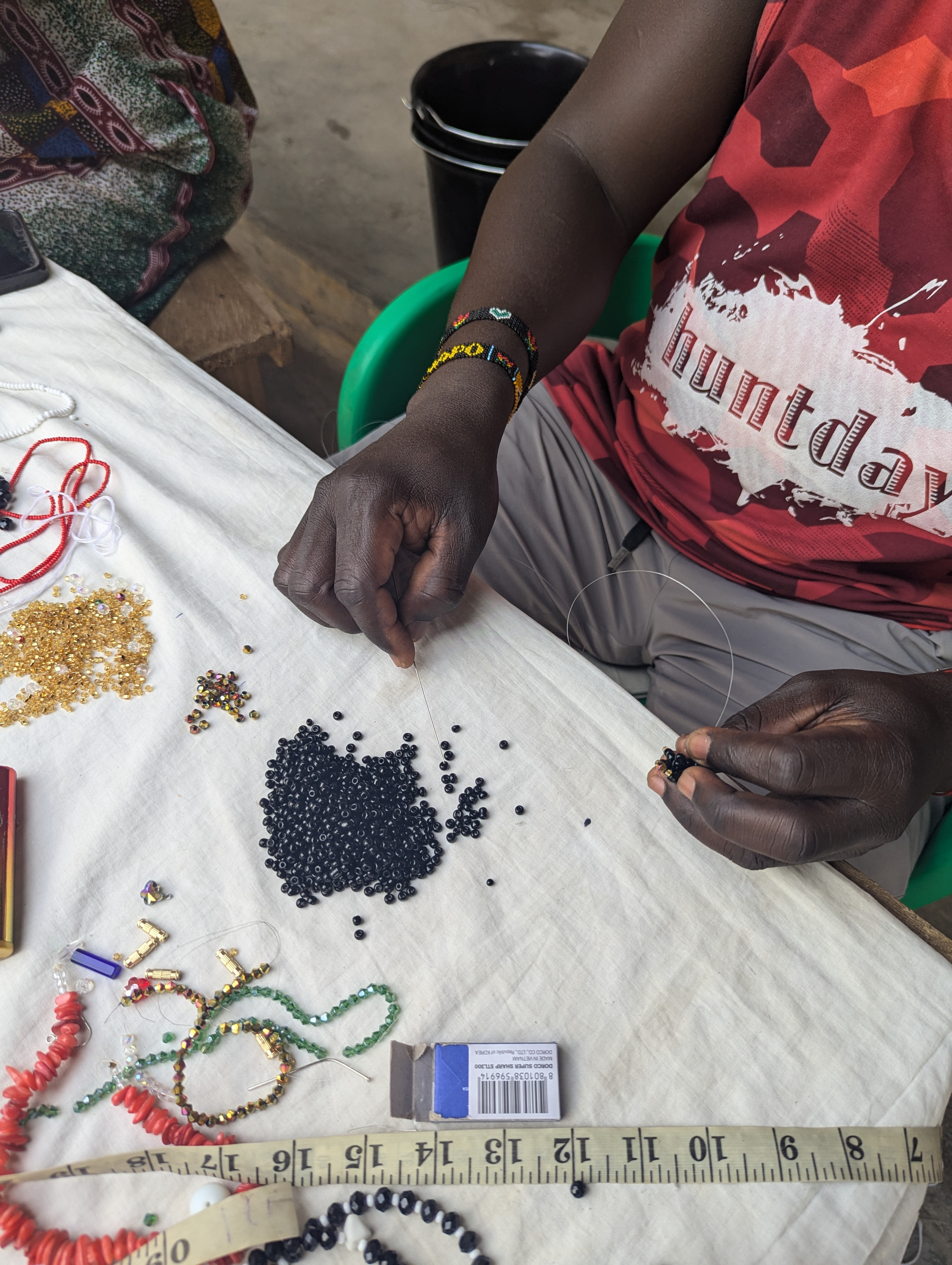
Stringing beads on a needle

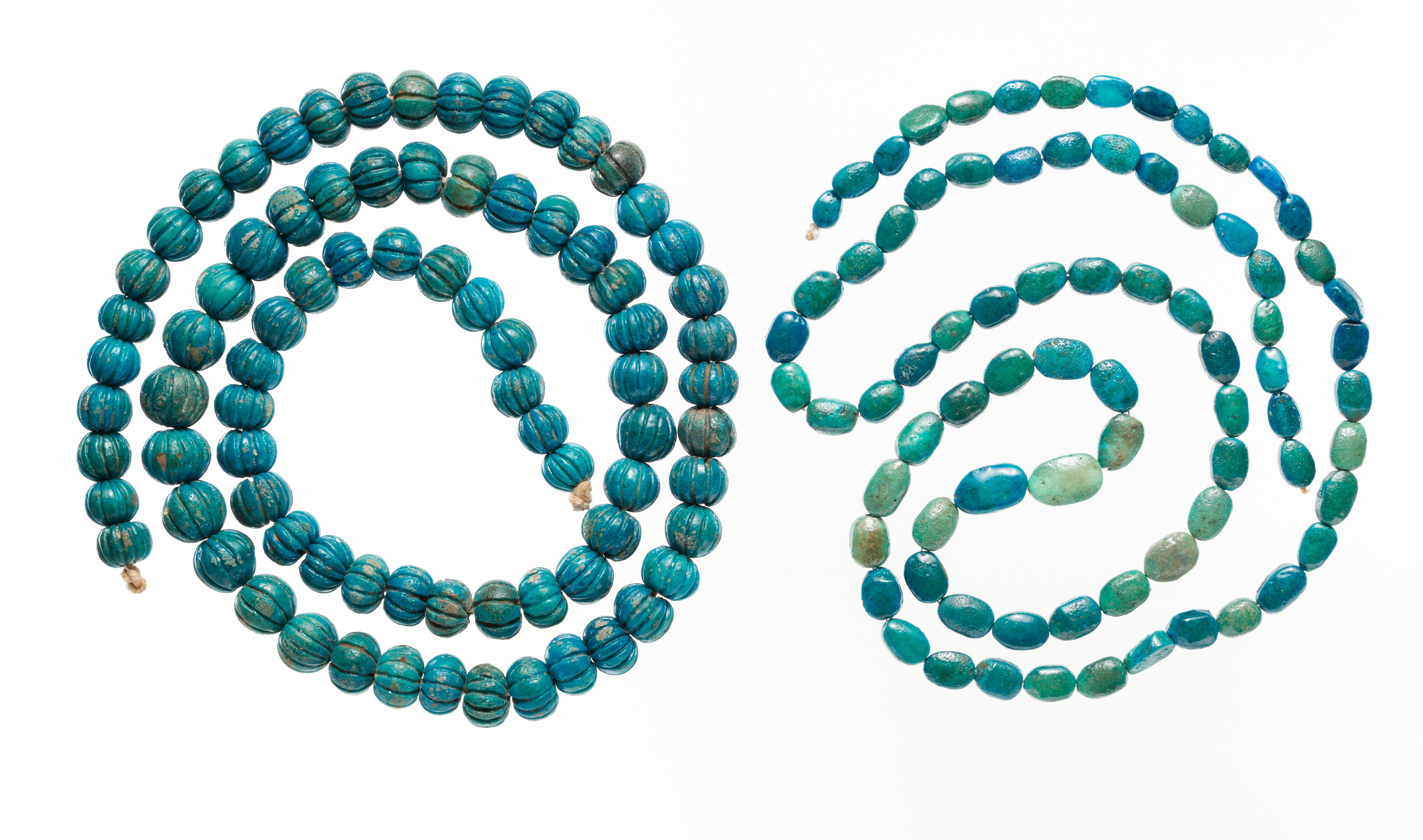
A pair of beaded necklaces

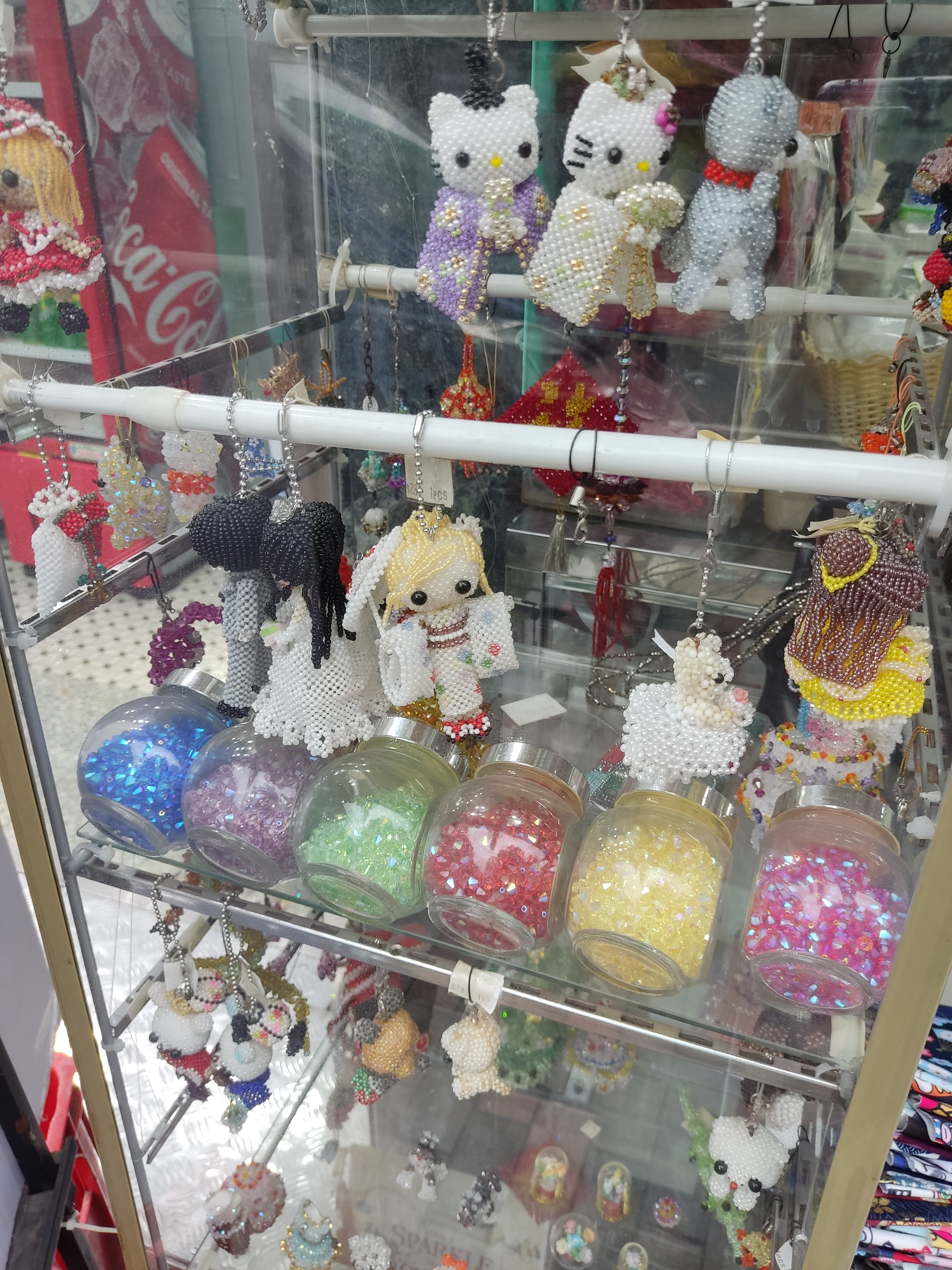
Beaded figures in Hong Kong

Bead stringing is a type of beadwork which involves putting beads on a string. It can range from simply sliding a single bead onto any thread-like medium (string, silk thread, leather thong, thin wire, multi-stranded beading wire, or a soft, flexible wire) to complex creations that have multiple strands or interwoven levels. The choice of stringing medium can be an important point in the overall design, since string-type mediums might be subject to unwanted stretching if the weight of the beads is considerable. Similarly, certain bead types with sharp edges, such as hollow metal beads or some varieties of stone or glass beads, might abrade the string and cause the strand to eventually break. Among the types of wire used for bead stringing, tiger tail wire is the most common.

The simplest design is a single bead centred as a concentrated point on the string medium. The ends of the string can be simply knotted together or components of a clasp may be attached to each end.

Next in complexity would be stringing multiple beads onto a single strand. Here alone are numerous opportunities for adding elements to the design concept. All of the beads might be identical, or varied (in shape, colour, type or any combination thereof) and used either in a random assortment or in a deliberate repeating pattern. Items not strictly defined as beads, such as pendants or "drops", might be placed within the strand to serve as focal points or accent elements in the design.

== Methods ==
=== Knotting ===
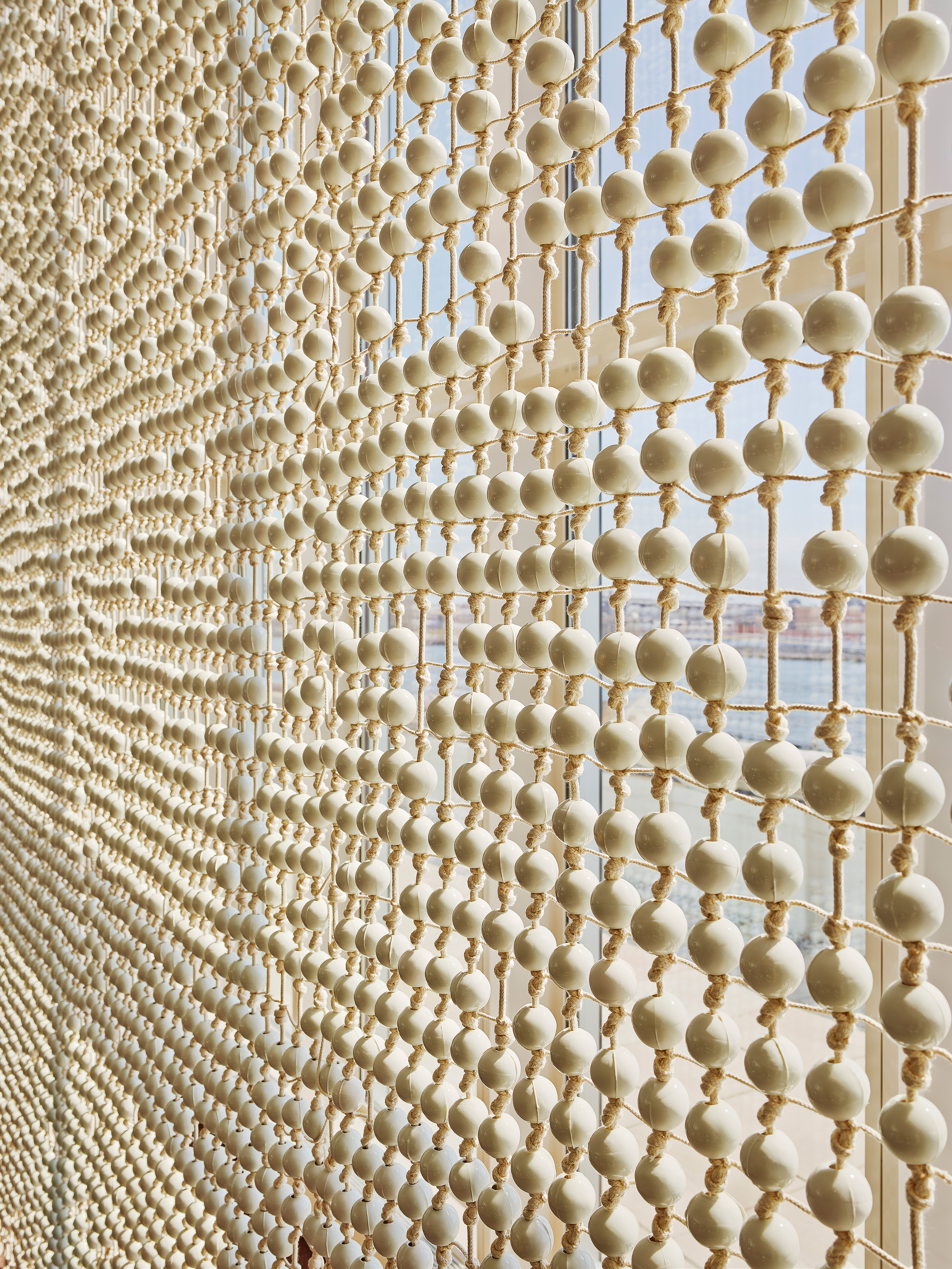
Knotted bead curtain in the UN Headquarters Delegates' Lounge, New York City, 2013

Knotting is a next level of proficiency in creating strands. Here the stringing medium (traditionally silk thread or synthetic fiber with similar properties) has knots tied into it as a means of separating the individual beads from each other. The traditional string of pearls is a well-known example of this technique. Pearls are threaded onto silk, and a knot is tied between each one to not only space them for greater individual prominence but to also keep them from rubbing directly against each other and risking the abrasion of the nacre that gives them their luster. This classic design can be varied by adding or substituting the pearls with other varieties of beads or varying the number and placement of knots used.

Multiple strands can be created using either the simple stringing or the knotting technique. Here, depending on the overall design, more planning may be called for. If the bead pattern is random, the only concern is that one strand be sized shorter than the next, so they will all lie flat and not interfere with each other when worn or displayed. However, if a specific repeating pattern is planned, then careful planning will be required so that the placement of matching portions of the pattern between the strands is aligned properly. A beading board, generally a flat panel with measured curved indentations in several staggered lengths, is a useful tool for spacing the beads to work out the desired pattern. Once the design has been worked out, joining the strands together might require special multiple-strand clasp fixtures unless there is a single knotting point or specific design element that will accommodate it.

=== Motikaari ===
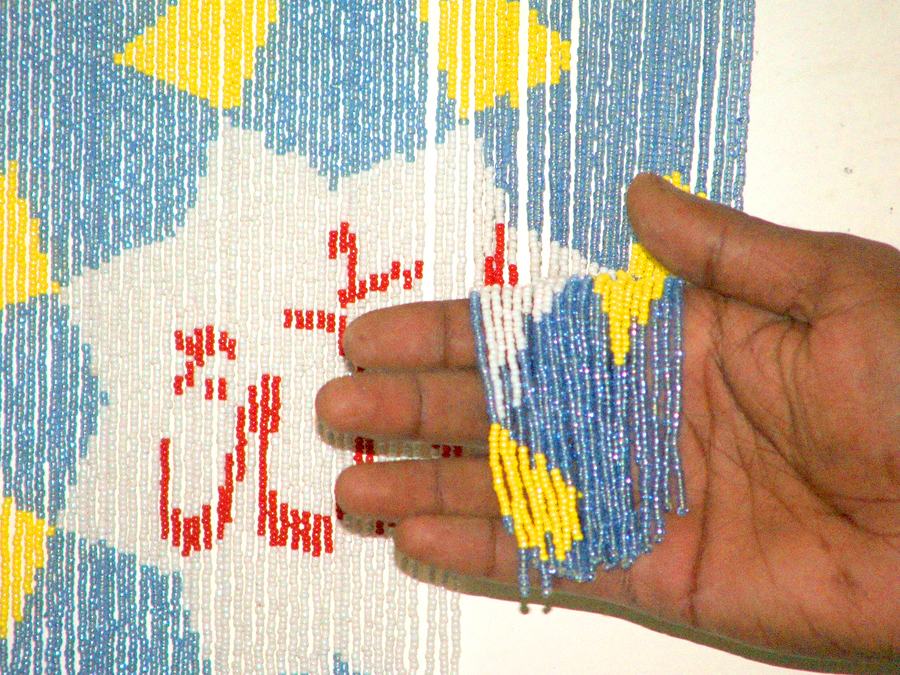
Motikaari artwork

Pakistani artist Nisar Ahmed Malik, a member of the Pakistan National Council of the Arts, developed a bead stringing method called Motikaari (an Urdu word for "beadwork"). It is a medium for artistic expression, including calligraphy or portraiture, by arranging patterns of seed beads of different textures and hues in the length of adjoined strings to create an image, such as a portrait or calligraphic design. The method involves three stages. The first stage is to prepare a desired pattern on paper. Then it is pasted on a flat panel hardboard sheet. In the third stage, the artist uses a needle to string the beads together into parallel columns according to the sketched pattern. When it is complete, the piece is removed from the hardboard and displayed as a hanging artwork.

== History ==
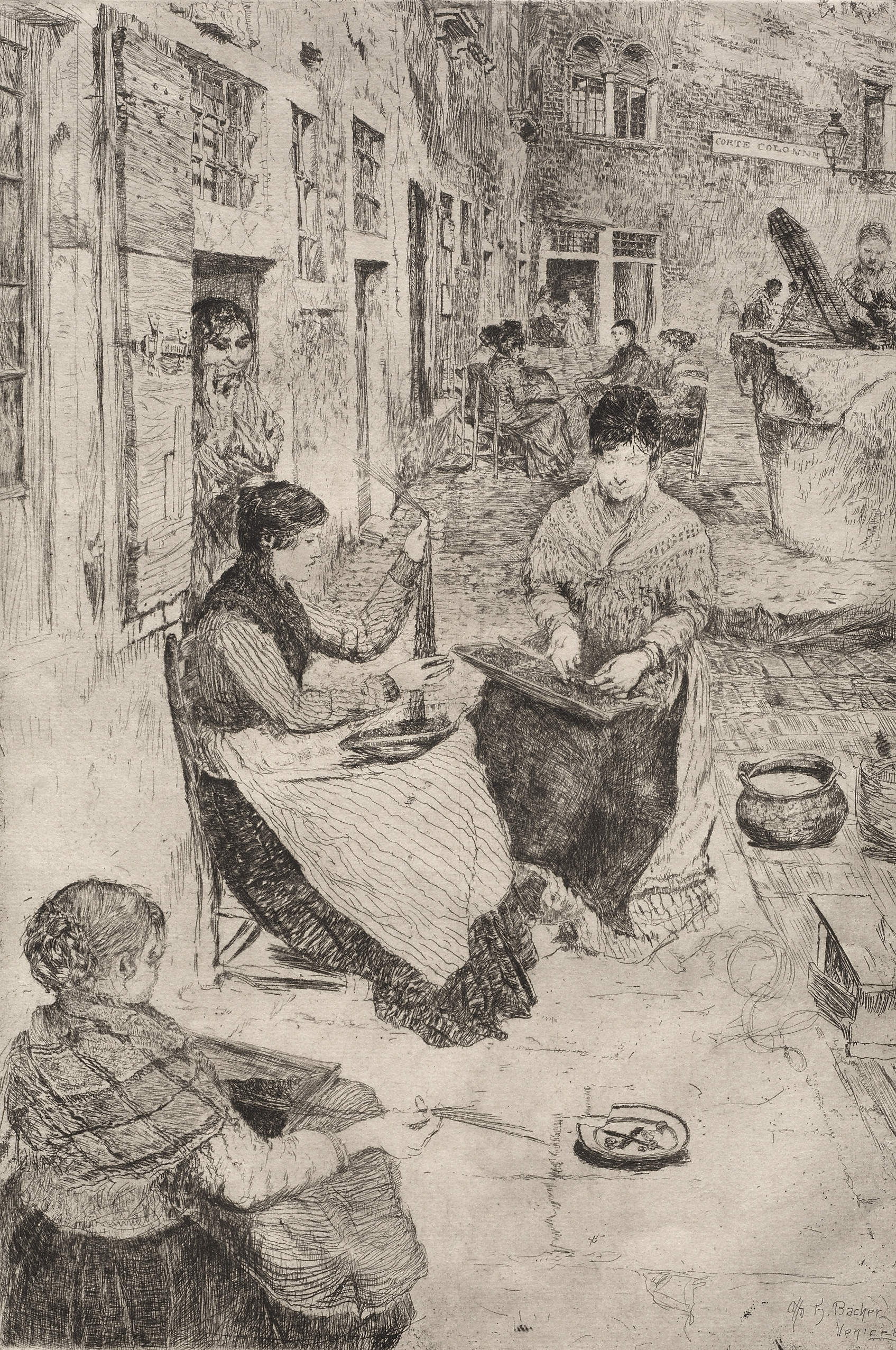
Etching of impiraresse by Otto H. Bacher, 1888

Until the early 20th century, Venetian women and girls commonly worked as impiraresse (bead stringers), preparing Venetian glass beads–especially seed beads–for transport and use as trade beads. The loose beads were difficult to recover if dropped, so the impiraresse strung the beads onto cotton or flax thread to create bead strings measuring 10 to 18 inches (25 to 46 cm), which could be transported more easily than loose beads. A single impiraressa would use 24 to 30 long, thin needles to quickly gather the beads from a tray held on her lap; this way, she could create many parallel bead strings at the same time. The profession became rare in the early- to mid-20th century, but due to cultural conservation efforts there are still some who practice the craft today.

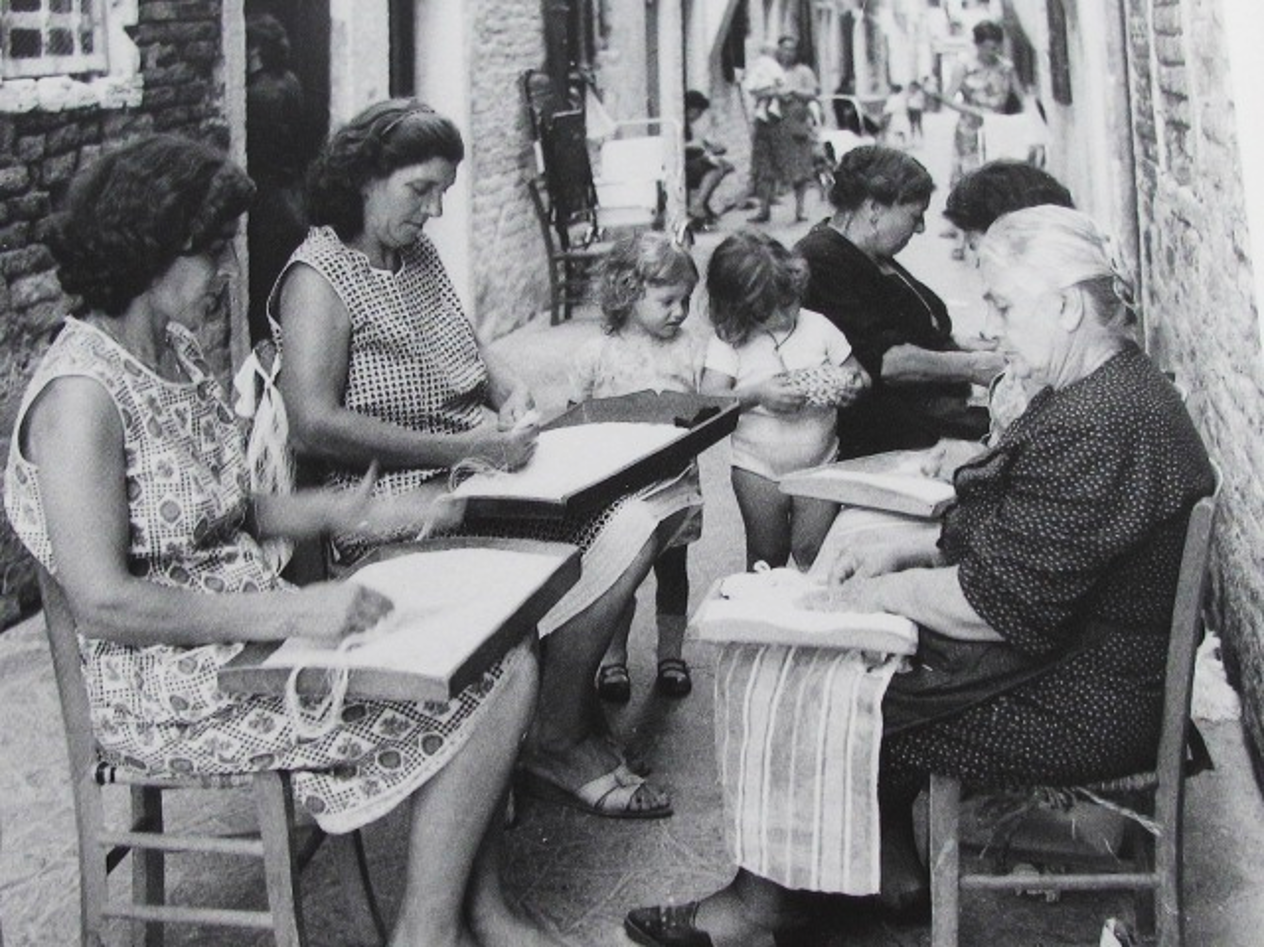
Impiraresse at work, 1960

These strings of beads were traded widely during the early modern period and were used in the Atlantic slave trade and European colonization of the Americas.
