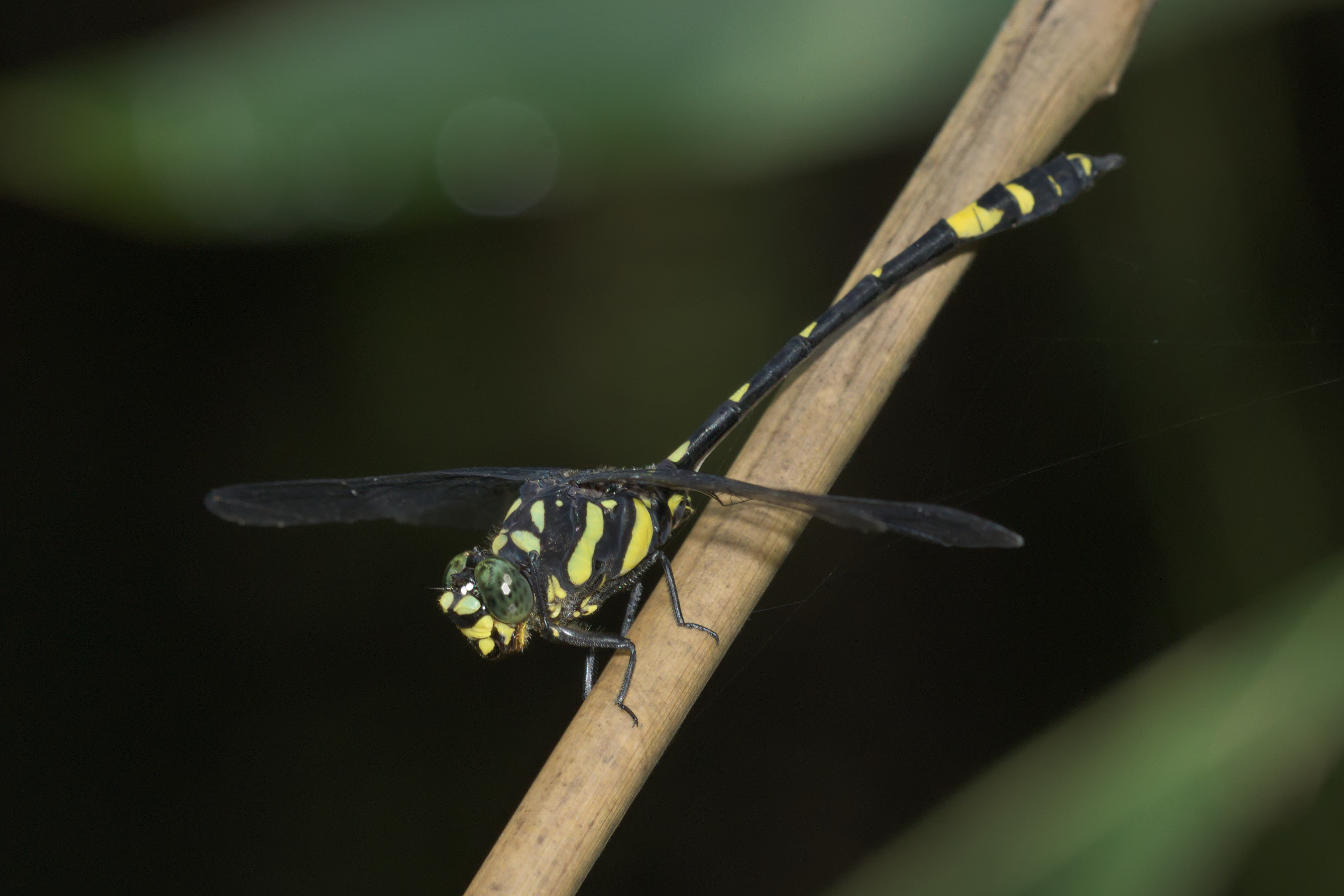
- Gomphidia kodaguensis

Scientific classification
- Kingdom: Animalia
- Phylum: Arthropoda
- Class: Insecta
- Order: Odonata
- Infraorder: Anisoptera
- Family: Gomphidae
- Genus: Gomphidia; Selys, 1854

Type species
- Gomphidia t-nigrum Selys, 1854

= Gomphidia =

Genus of dragonflies

Gomphidia is a genus of dragonfly in the family Gomphidae. It contains the following species:

- Gomphidia abbotti Williamson, 1907
- Gomphidia bredoi (Schouteden, 1934)
- Gomphidia caesarea Lieftinck, 1929
- Gomphidia confluens Selys, 1878
- Gomphidia flechteri Fraser, 1923
- Gomphidia fukienensis Chao, 1955
- Gomphidia gamblesi Gauthier, 1987
- Gomphidia ganeshi Chhotani, Lahiri & Mitra, 1983
- Gomphidia javanica Förster, 1889
- Gomphidia kelloggi Needham, 1930 - Chinese tiger
- Gomphidia kirschii Selys, 1878
- Gomphidia kodaguensis Fraser, 1923
- Gomphidia kruegeri Martin, 1904
- Gomphidia leonorae Mitra, 1994
- Gomphidia maclachlani Selys, 1873
- Gomphidia pearsoni Fraser, 1933 - rivulet riger
- Gomphidia platyceps Fraser, 1953
- Gomphidia podhigai Babu & Subramanian, 2019
- Gomphidia quarrei (Schouteden, 1934) - Quarre's tiger, Quarre's Fingertail
- Gomphidia t-nigrum Selys, 1854
- Gomphidia williamsoni Fraser, 1923
