= Lindeniidae =

Scientific classification
- Kingdom: Animalia
- Phylum: Arthropoda
- Clade: Pancrustacea
- Class: Insecta
- Order: Odonata
- Infraorder: Anisoptera
- Superfamily: Gomphoidea
- Family: Lindeniidae; Jacobson and Bianchi, 1905

Obsolete family of dragonflies

Up until recently, Lindeniidae was considered a family of dragonflies occurring in Australia. It is no longer recognised.

== Genera ==
The family included the following genus which has now been assigned to the family Gomphidae:

- Ictinogomphus Cowley, 1934

The family also included the following fossil genera, which have also been assigned to Gomphidae.

- †Burmalindenia Schädel and Bechly 2016 Burmese amber, Cenomanian
- †Cratolindenia Bechly 2000 Crato Formation, Brazil, Aptian
