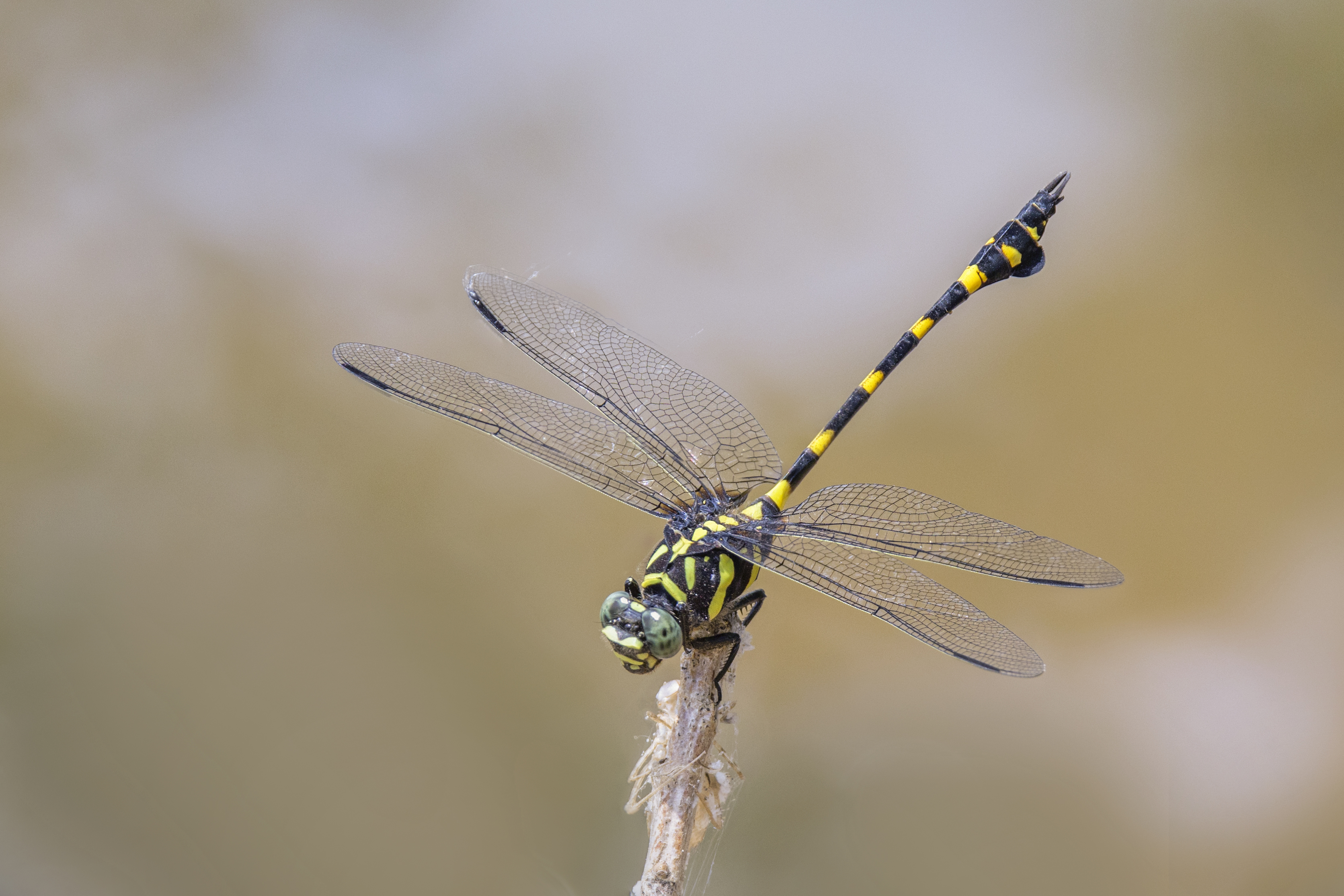
- Male, Cambodia

Conservation status
- Least Concern (IUCN 3.1)

Scientific classification
- Kingdom: Animalia
- Phylum: Arthropoda
- Clade: Pancrustacea
- Class: Insecta
- Order: Odonata
- Infraorder: Anisoptera
- Family: Gomphidae
- Genus: Ictinogomphus
- Species: I. decoratus

Binomial name
- Ictinogomphus decoratus (Selys, 1854)

= Ictinogomphus decoratus =

Species of dragonfly

Ictinogomphus decoratus, the common flangetail, is a species of clubtail dragonfly found in Southeast Asia.

Two subspecies of Ictinogomphus decoratus are recognized: I. d. decoratus, found on the Indonesian islands of Sumatra and Java, and I. d. melaenops, found from Borneo and the Philippines north to Thailand.

The species is considered of least concern on the IUCN Red List.
