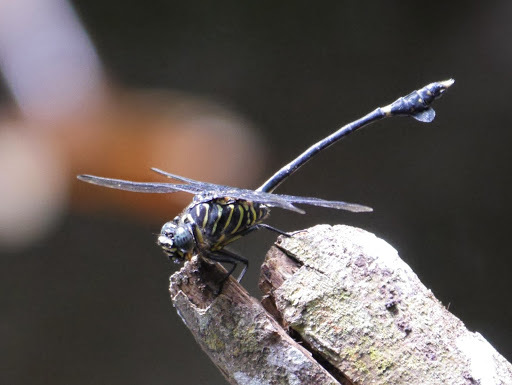

Conservation status
- Least Concern (IUCN 3.1)

Scientific classification
- Kingdom: Animalia
- Phylum: Arthropoda
- Class: Insecta
- Order: Odonata
- Infraorder: Anisoptera
- Family: Gomphidae
- Genus: Ictinogomphus
- Species: I. regisalberti

Binomial name
- Ictinogomphus regisalberti (Schouteden, 1934)

= Ictinogomphus regisalberti =

Species of dragonfly

Ictinogomphus regisalberti is a species of dragonfly in the family Gomphidae. It is found in Angola, Uganda, and possibly the Democratic Republic of the Congo. Its natural habitats are subtropical or tropical moist lowland forests and rivers. It is threatened by habitat loss.
