= Tigertail (disambiguation) =

Tigertail is a family of dragonflies.

Tigertail may also refer to:

- Common Tigertail, a species of dragonfly
- Tigertail (book), a book by Emma Trelles
- Tigertail (film), a 2020 film

== Fictional characters ==
- Josie Tigertail
- Sammy Tigertail

== See also ==
- Tigertails
- Tigertailz
- The Tiger's Tail
