= Tiger by the Tail =

Tiger by the Tail may refer to:

== Books ==
- "Tiger by the Tail" (short story), a 1961 science fiction short story by Alan E. Nourse
- Medusa: A Tiger by the Tail, a 1983 science fiction novel by Jack L. Chalker
- Tiger by the Tail (Chase novel), a 1954 thriller novel by James Hadley Chase
- Tiger by the Tail (Coelho novel), a 2013 novel by Indian author Venita Coelho

== Film and TV ==
- Tiger by the Tail (1955 film), a British crime film directed by John Gilling and starring Larry Parks, Constance Smith and Donald Stewart
- Tiger by the Tail (1970 film), an American crime film starring Christopher George and Tippi Hedren

== See also ==
- "I've Got a Tiger By the Tail," a 1964 country-western song by Buck Owens
