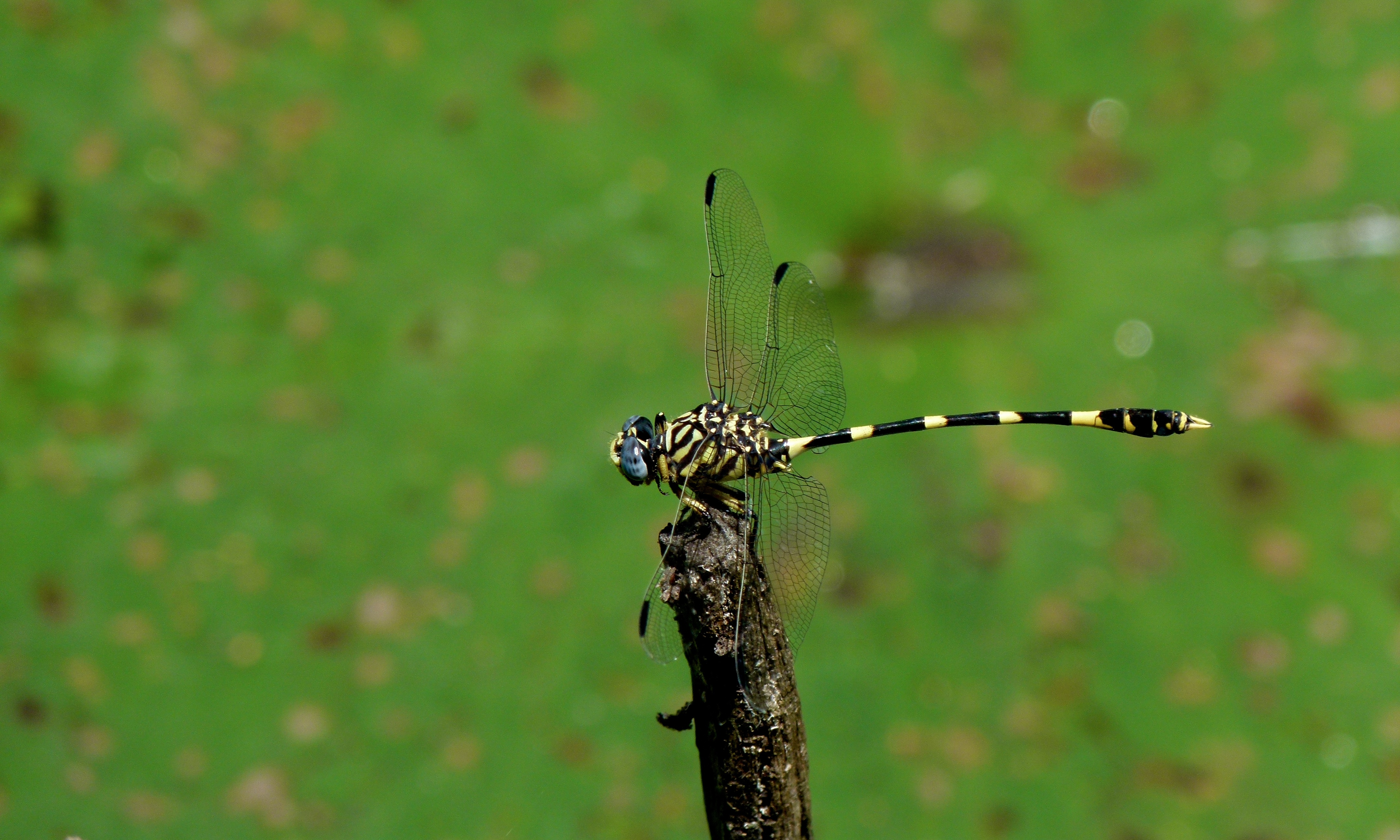

Conservation status
- Least Concern (IUCN 3.1)

Scientific classification
- Kingdom: Animalia
- Phylum: Arthropoda
- Class: Insecta
- Order: Odonata
- Infraorder: Anisoptera
- Family: Gomphidae
- Genus: Gomphidia
- Species: G. quarrei

Binomial name
- Gomphidia quarrei (Schouteden, 1934)

= Gomphidia quarrei =

Species of dragonfly

Gomphidia quarrei is a species of dragonfly in the family Gomphidae. It is found in Angola, Botswana, the Democratic Republic of the Congo, Kenya, Malawi, Mozambique, Namibia, South Africa, Tanzania, Zambia, and Zimbabwe. Its natural habitats are subtropical or tropical moist lowland forests, subtropical or tropical dry shrubland, subtropical or tropical moist shrubland, and rivers.
