= Gomphidia bredoi =

Conservation status
- Least Concern (IUCN 3.1)

Scientific classification
- Kingdom: Animalia
- Phylum: Arthropoda
- Class: Insecta
- Order: Odonata
- Infraorder: Anisoptera
- Family: Gomphidae
- Genus: Gomphidia
- Species: G. bredoi

Binomial name
- Gomphidia bredoi (Schouteden, 1934)

Species of dragonfly

Gomphidia bredoi is a species of dragonfly in the family Gomphidae. It is found in Angola, the Democratic Republic of the Congo, Ivory Coast, Ghana, Nigeria, and Uganda. Its natural habitats are subtropical or tropical moist lowland forests and rivers. It is threatened by habitat loss.
