= Tiger by the Tail (Coelho novel) =

2013 book by Venita Coelho

First edition

Tiger by the Tail is a 2013 novel by Indian author Venita Coelho (also the author of the story collection Dungeon Tales). It has been illustrated by Priya Kuriyan and published by Hachette India. The novel tells the story of Rana, an eleven-and-a-half-year-old boy, who is on a mission to save the tigers from disappearing from various Indian forests.

== Plot ==
Rana is eleven and a half years old, and is a sickly and allergic child. He has a grandfather who is an inventor, and who keeps trying to make various remedies for Rana's problems, and also carries out experiments. But one day, he discovers a tiger on their doorstep, who demands breakfast and turns out to be Bagha, a friend of Rana's grandfather. Rana discovers that he can speak to animals, and his parents had started an intelligence agency called the AIA (Animal Intelligence Agency). Its aim was to capture poachers and ensure protection for all sorts of wildlife. However, it was destroyed by an attack on the headquarters which killed Rana's parents. Bagha has come to Rana's grandfather to seek guidance as tigers are disappearing all over India. It is the dreaded enemy of all animals, the Taker, who is the poacher responsible for the death of Rana's parents. Rana convinces Bagha to let him accompany him on his mission, as he desires revenge. After a misadventure involving notorious gangster called Muchchhad Master, they reach the Red Fort in Delhi, India, to seek a disgraced former agent of the AIA, called Kela, who was removed from duty after the Incident of the Exploding Mangoes. He leads them to Taklé, who is another criminal who keeps animals. From there, they learn they have to go to Kathmandu, where they meet a holy bull called Kaloji (Agent Number 27), who tells them that the Tigers are going to Tibet. After that follows a dangerous adventure to Tibet, where they are rescued from the extreme cold by the Yeti or the Abominable Snowman. From Tibet, they journey on to the Forbidden City, where they find another city underground. The missing tigers are all part of an operation to overthrow the governors of China and install the descendant of the last Emperor, 'the General', on the throne. Using the tigers, he has taken a part of their genes to make an elixir which will make its user immortal. Rana manages to save the tigers, and by mistake, receives a shot of the elixir, which makes him immortal. But the General is not the last enemy to be defeated. The Taker is still at large, and when the final confrontation comes, it is much more terrible than Rana has ever thought.

== About the author ==
Venita Coelho is a writer and an artist who lives in Goa. She has had a career in television and is also a screenwriter. As an artist, she works on glass and canvas.
