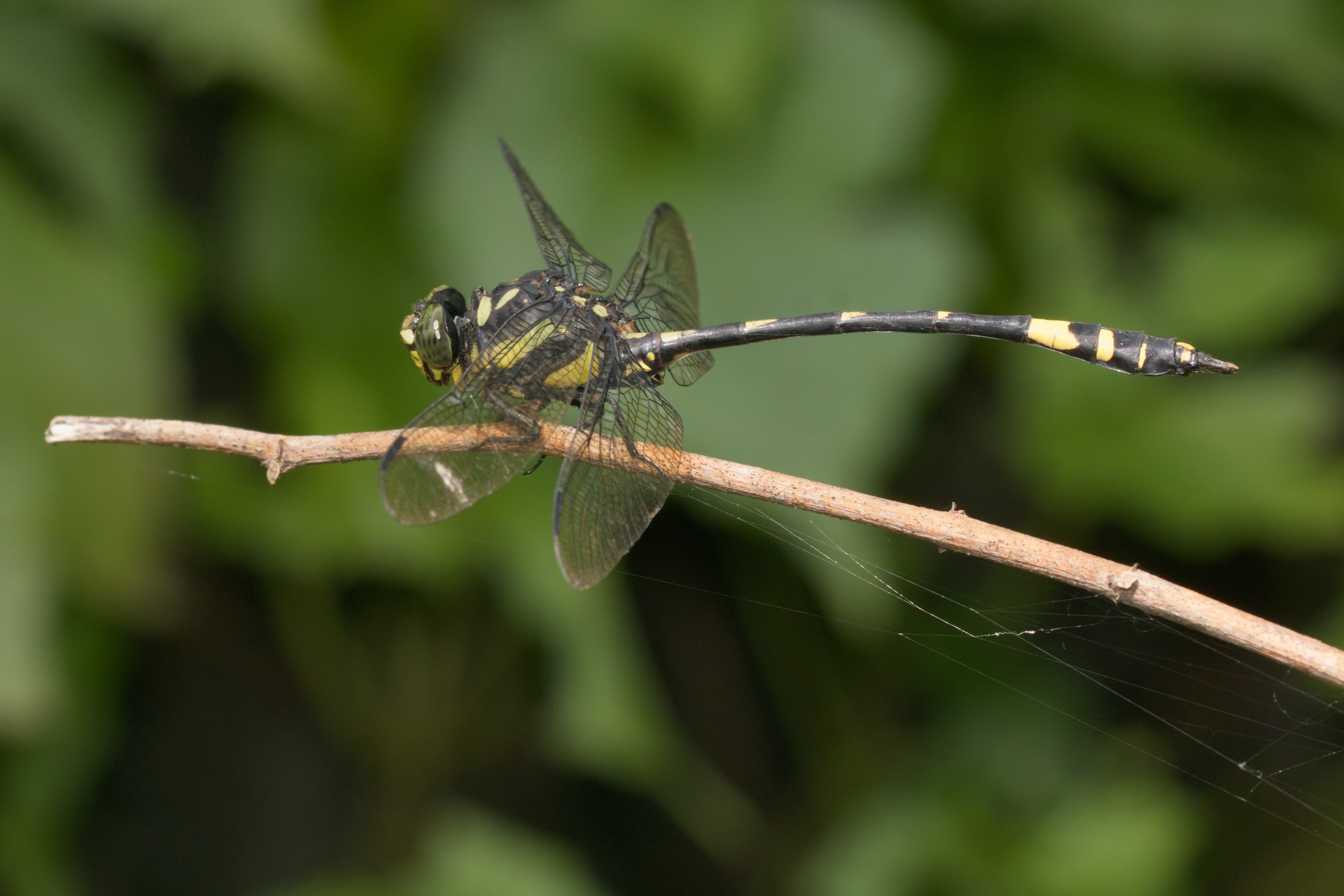
- Male

Conservation status
- Data Deficient (IUCN 3.1)

Scientific classification
- Kingdom: Animalia
- Phylum: Arthropoda
- Class: Insecta
- Order: Odonata
- Infraorder: Anisoptera
- Family: Gomphidae
- Genus: Gomphidia
- Species: G. kodaguensis

Binomial name
- Gomphidia kodaguensis Fraser, 1923

= Gomphidia kodaguensis =

Species of dragonfly

Gomphidia kodaguensis is a species of dragonfly in the family Gomphidae. It is known only from the Western Ghats of India.

== Description and habitat ==
It is a large dragonfly with bottle-green eyes. Its thorax black, marked with yellow. There are two broad and oval greenish-yellow dorsal stripes, pointed below and not nearly meeting the meso-thoracic collar. There are two broad yellow stripes separated by a broad black stripe on each side. Abdomen is black, marked with yellow. Segment 1 has a fine apical dorsal ring. Segment 2 has a small oval dorsal spot on the basal two-thirds. Segment 3 to 6 have dorsal basal spots. Segment 7 has the basal half yellow. Segment 8 has a long transverse basal spot. Segment 9 is unmarked. Segment 10 has a dorsal spot covering the entire dorsum. Anal appendages are black. Female is similar to the male.

It is commonly found in streams and rivers in hilly and mountainous areas.

== See also ==
- List of odonates of India
- List of odonata of Kerala
