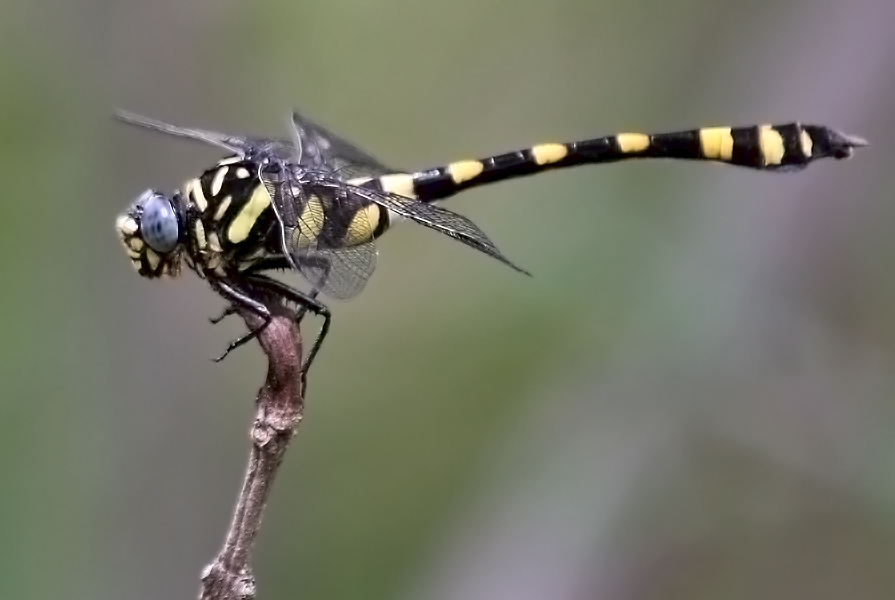
- Ictinogomphus rapax (Common Clubtail)

Scientific classification
- Kingdom: Animalia
- Phylum: Arthropoda
- Clade: Pancrustacea
- Class: Insecta
- Order: Odonata
- Infraorder: Anisoptera
- Family: Gomphidae
- Genus: Ictinogomphus; Cowley, 1934

Synonyms
- Ictinus Rambur, 1842; Indictinogomphus Fraser, 1939; Austrictinogomphus Fraser, 1940

= Ictinogomphus =

Ictinogomphus Temporal range: Late Oligocene–present

Genus of dragonflies

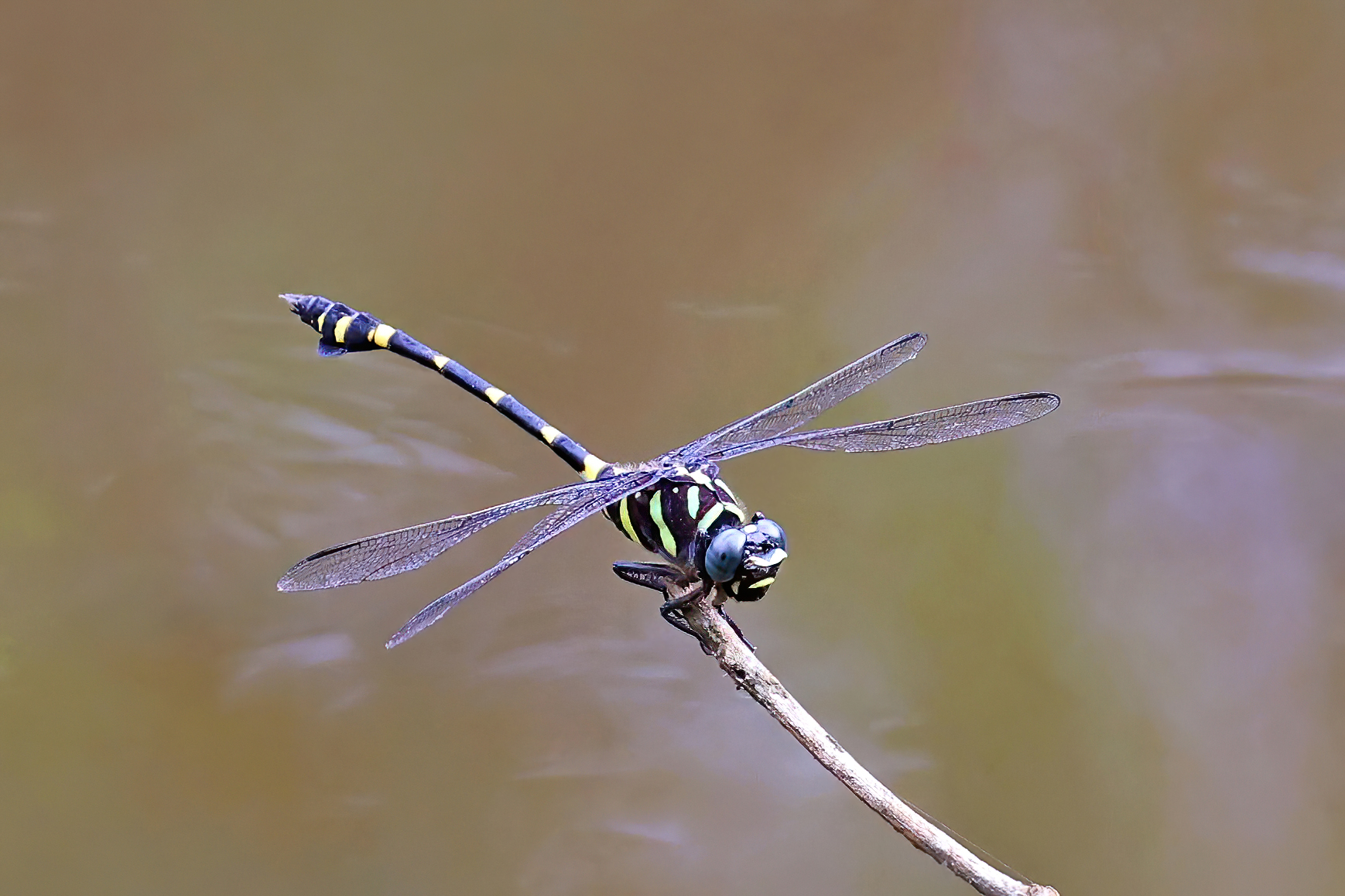
Common flangetail I. decoratus melaenops male Thailand

Ictinogomphus is a genus of dragonflies in the family Gomphidae. They are medium to large, yellow and black with clear wings. Species occur in Africa, Asia and Australia. Fossil species are also known from Europe.

== Species ==
The genus Ictinogomphus includes the following species:

- Ictinogomphus alaquopterus Yousuf & Yunus, 1976
- Ictinogomphus angulosus (Selys, 1854)
- Ictinogomphus australis (Selys, 1873) - Australian tiger
- Ictinogomphus celebensis (Schmidt, 1934)
- Ictinogomphus decoratus (Selys, 1854) - common flangetail
- Ictinogomphus dobsoni Watson, 1969 - Pilbara tiger
- Ictinogomphus (Cinitogomphus) dundoensis (Pinhey, 1961) - Swamp Tigertail
- Ictinogomphus ferox (Rambur, 1842) - common tiger, common tigertail
- Ictinogomphus fraseri Kimmins, 1958
- Ictinogomphus kishori Ram, 1985
- Ictinogomphus paulini Watson, 1991 - Cape York tiger
- Ictinogomphus pertinax (Hagen in Selys, 1854)
- Ictinogomphus pugnovittatus Yousuf & Yunus, 1976
- Ictinogomphus rapax (Rambur, 1842) - common clubtail
- Ictinogomphus regisalberti (Schouteden, 1934)
- Ictinogomphus tenax (Hagen in Selys, 1854)

The following fossil species are also known:

- †Ictinogomphus engelorum Nel, Poschmann & Wedmann, 2020 (Late Oligocene of Germany)
- †Ictinogomphus hassleri Schädel & Lechner, 2017 (Middle Miocene of Austria)

The former fossil species †Ictinogomphus fur Hagen, 1863 from the Oligocene of Germany is thought to no longer belong to this genus, due to differences in the wing structure.

== Notes on taxonomy ==
Jules Rambur originally described this genus as Ictinus in 1842. However, at the time there already existed a genus of beetle also named Ictinus described by François Laporte in 1834. In 1934, John Cowley, an English entomologist, renamed this species to Ictinogomphus in deference to Rambur's original name. Cowley is now regarded as the authority, and this genus can be formally written as: Ictinogomphus Cowley, 1934.

Up until recently, species of Ictinogomphus were sometimes considered to be in the family Lindeniidae. Lindeniidae is no longer recognised as a family, and Ictinogomphus is now found in the family, Gomphidae.

== Etymology ==
The genus name Ictinogomphus is derived from the Greek ἴκτινος (iktinos, "kite"), combined with Gomphus, a genus name derived from the Greek γόμφος (gomphos, "peg" or "nail"). The name likely refers to the large size of the genus, emphasised by the distinctive large flaps near the end of the abdomen in both males and females.
