= Tiger tail wire =

Thin nylon-encased wire used for beadwork

Tiger tail wire (also called tiger tail or tiger-tail) is a thin wire encased in nylon often used in beaded jewellery, and particularly suited to stringing heavy beads and sharp beads, which tend to fray other kinds of thread. For this reason, tiger tail is the thread of choice for gemstones.

Some tiger tail has multiple intertwined wire threads under the nylon coating. The wire threads are made of stainless steel.

Tiger tail cannot be fashioned into a knot in order to end a sequence of beads as other kinds of thread can; instead, crimp beads are often used for this purpose. Crimp beads are also used as spacers between other beads strung on tiger tail.

Among the types of wire used for bead stringing, tiger tail is the most common. Tiger tail is easier to use than many other kinds of thread, and it does not require the use of a sewing needle. Tiger tail has high ultimate tensile strength and is therefore extremely difficult to tear, but if it is creased or twisted, tiger tail has a tendency to kink and then become brittle in the kinked area.

== Bibliography ==
- Georgene Lockwood (1988). The Complete Idiot's Guide to Crafts With Kids. Penguin Books. ISBN 1101198621.
