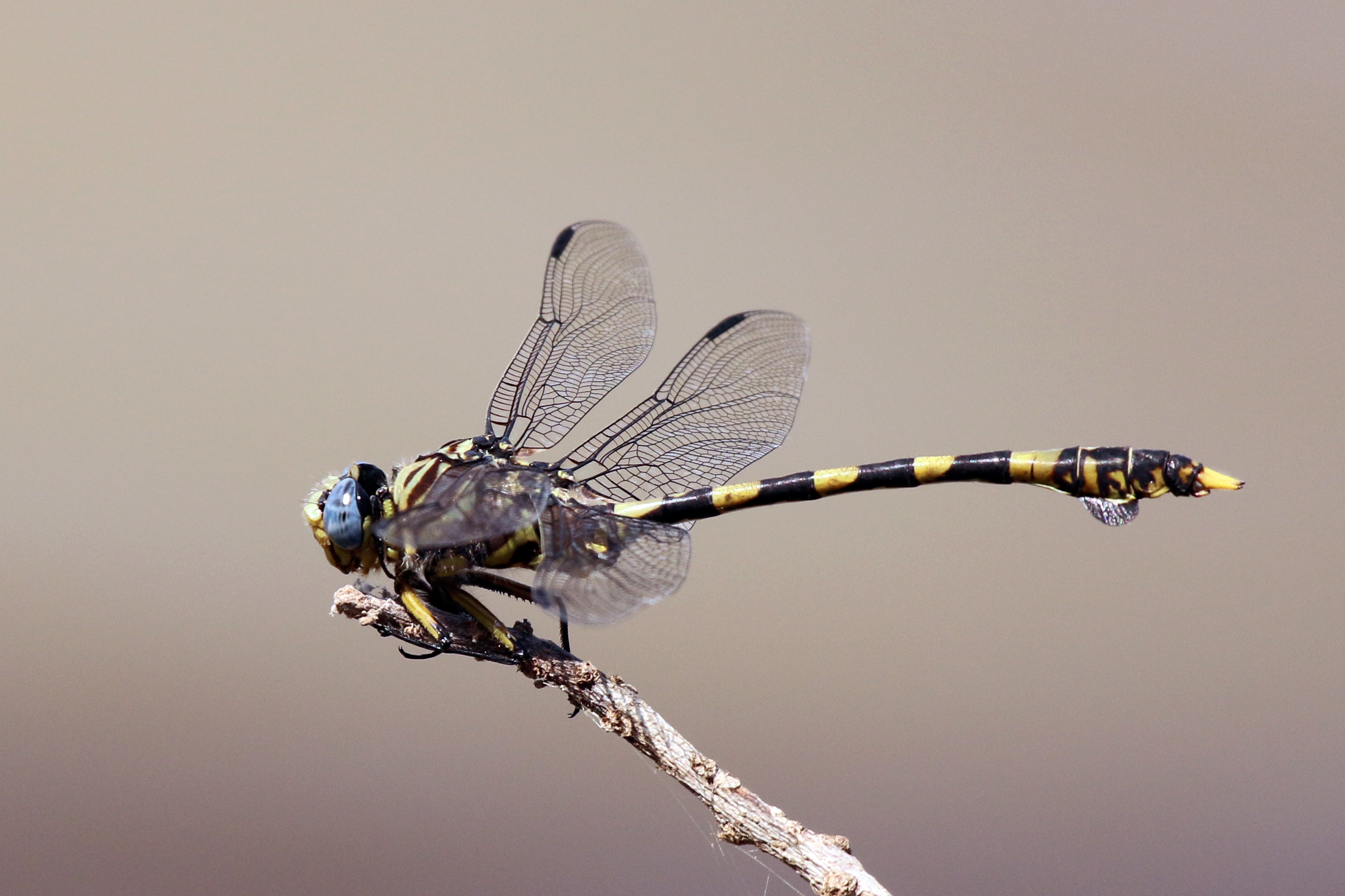
- Male, iSimangaliso Wetland Park, KwaZulu Natal, South Africa

Conservation status
- Least Concern (IUCN 3.1)

Scientific classification
- Kingdom: Animalia
- Phylum: Arthropoda
- Clade: Pancrustacea
- Class: Insecta
- Order: Odonata
- Infraorder: Anisoptera
- Family: Gomphidae
- Genus: Ictinogomphus
- Species: I. ferox

Binomial name
- Ictinogomphus ferox (Rambur, 1842)

= Ictinogomphus ferox =

Species of dragonfly

Ictinogomphus ferox, commonly called the common tiger or the common tigertail, is a species of dragonfly in the family Gomphidae. It is found in Algeria, Angola, Botswana, Central African Republic, the Democratic Republic of the Congo, Ivory Coast, Ghana, Guinea, Kenya, Liberia, Malawi, Mozambique, Namibia, Nigeria, Senegal, Somalia, South Africa, Tanzania, Togo, Uganda, Zambia, Zimbabwe, possibly Burundi, and possibly Ethiopia. Its natural habitats are subtropical or tropical moist lowland forests, dry savanna, moist savanna, subtropical or tropical dry shrubland, subtropical or tropical moist shrubland, rivers, intermittent rivers, shrub-dominated wetlands, swamps, freshwater lakes, intermittent freshwater lakes, freshwater marshes, intermittent freshwater marshes, and freshwater springs. In Algeria, it has also been recorded in the Algerian Sahara, in Tassili n'Ajjer National Park.
