= Tiger Tale =

- Front cover illustration
- Author: Steve Isham
- Illustrator: Marion Isham
- Cover artist: Marion Isham
- Genre: Children's picture book
- Publisher: Bandicoot Books
- Publication date: 2002
- Publication place: Australia
- Media type: Hardback
- Pages: 32
- ISBN: 0-9586536-8-2
- OCLC: 60330367

Tiger Tale is a children's picture book illustrated by Marion Isham and written by Steve Isham. First published in 2002, the book retells the Aboriginal story of how the Tasmanian tiger got its stripes. Tiger Tale is illustrated using torn paper collage that gives the book a folkloric style.

== Plot ==
The story starts with the Tiger, all golden, without his stripes, singing. The Tiger walks through the forest down to the river, singing all the way. He passes the platypus and meets the Bunyip who tells him to go away and stop singing. Leaving the river he meets Kanga, who also tells him to stop singing. Finally Great Bird tells him to stop singing. As Tiger goes on his way he notices a bushfire approaching and goes back to the river to summon the other animals, however all three, Bunyip, Kanga and Great Bird all desert him. Tiger runs back and forth from the river to the fire until the fire is extinguished but the Tiger has lost his voice and the soot leaves stripes on his back.

== Sales, background and critical reaction ==
Tiger Tale is in its second printing and has been sold throughout Australia through Australian Geographic stores. The title was favorably reviewed in the Magpies magazine of children's literature in May 2003. In April 2011, it was selected to be included as part of the official gift from the Tasmanian government to Denmark's Prince Fredrick and Princess Mary, on the arrival of their twins.

== See also ==
- Tasmanian tiger
