= Gomphidia pearsoni =

Conservation status
- Vulnerable (IUCN 3.1)

Scientific classification
- Kingdom: Animalia
- Phylum: Arthropoda
- Clade: Pancrustacea
- Class: Insecta
- Order: Odonata
- Infraorder: Anisoptera
- Family: Gomphidae
- Genus: Gomphidia
- Species: G. pearsoni

Binomial name
- Gomphidia pearsoni Fraser, 1933

Species of dragonfly

Gomphidia pearsoni is a species of dragonfly in the family Gomphidae. It is endemic to Sri Lanka. Its natural habitats are subtropical or tropical moist lowland forests and rivers. It is threatened by habitat loss.
