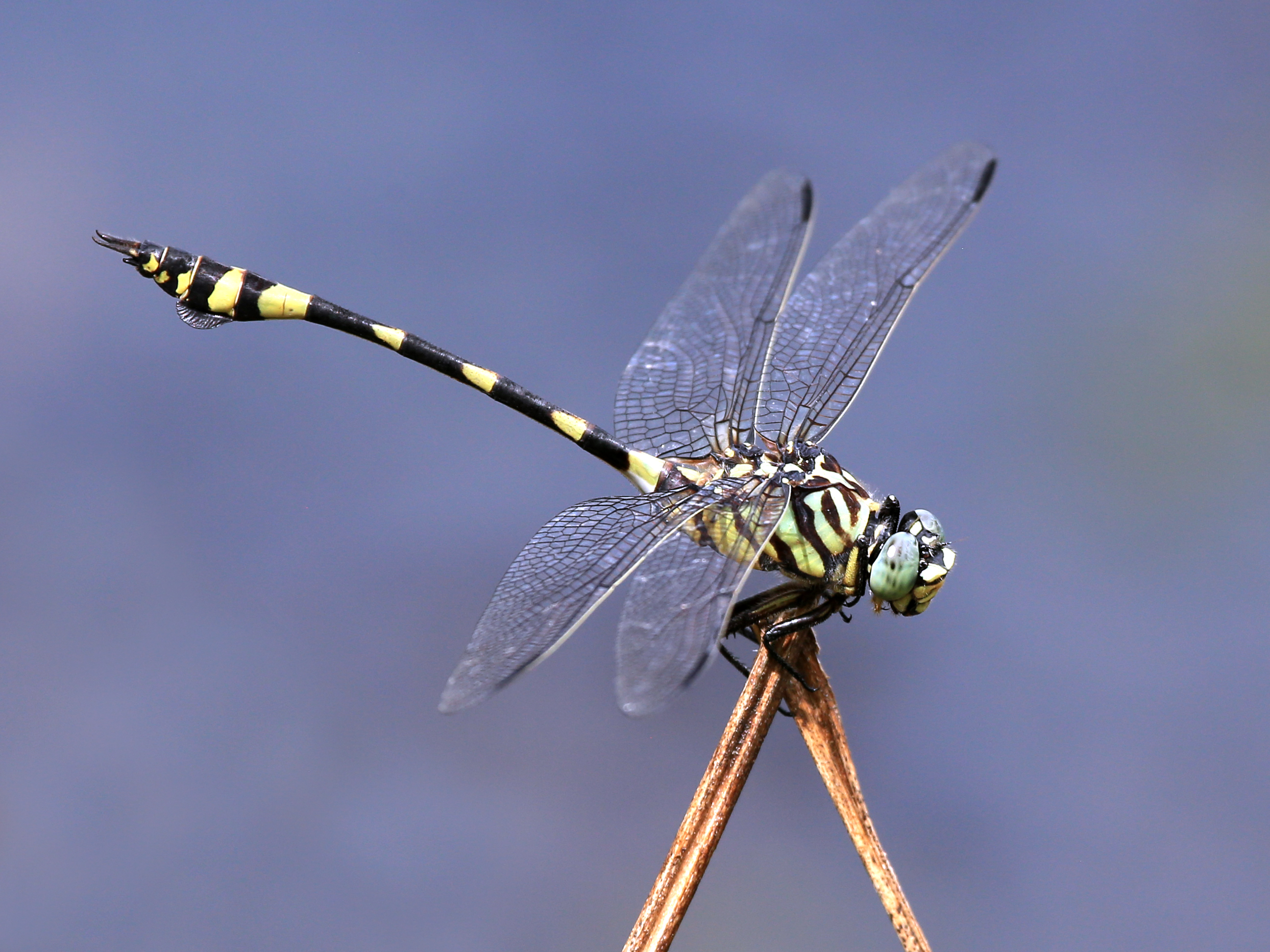
- Male
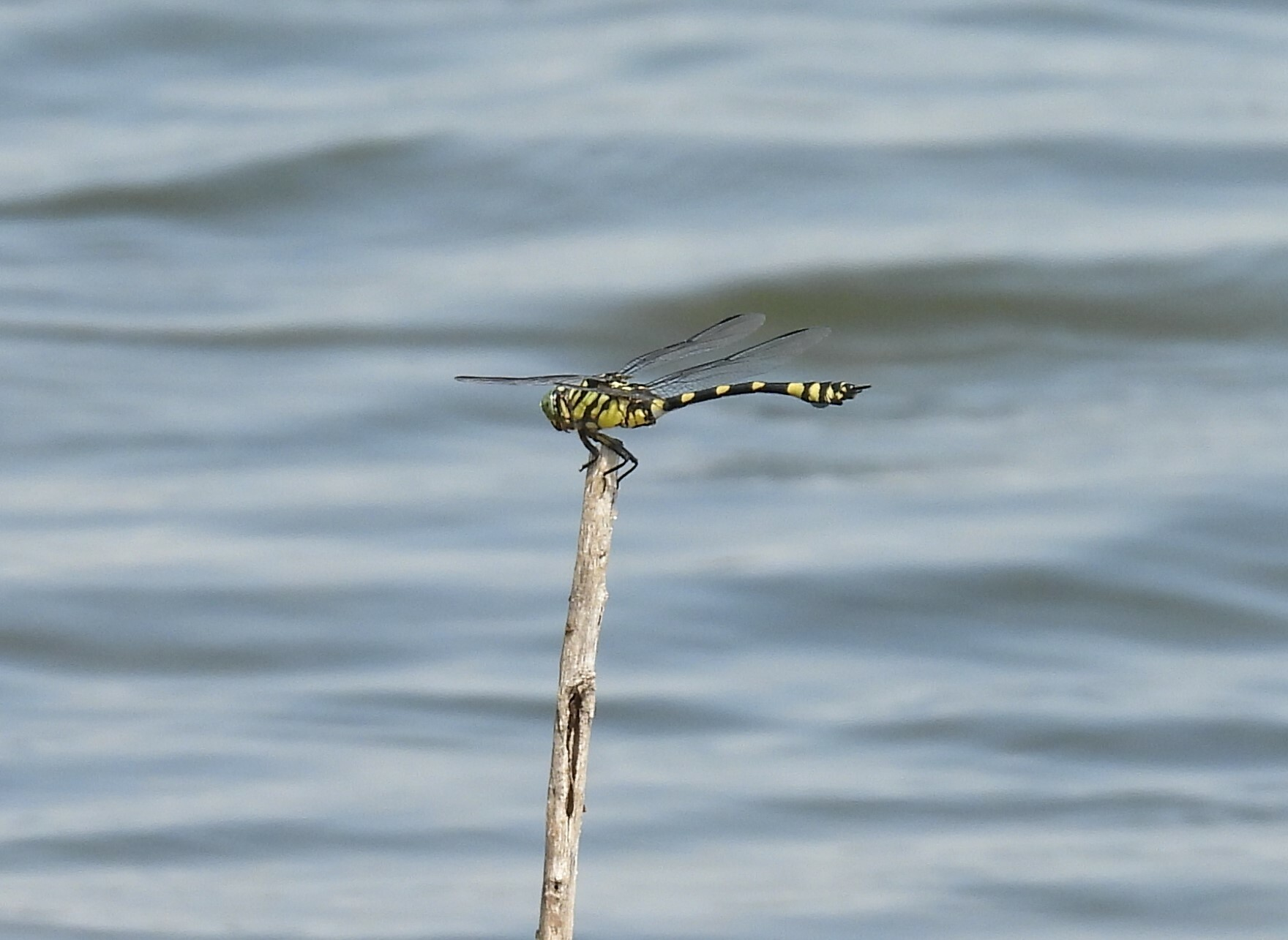
- Female

Conservation status
- Least Concern (IUCN 3.1)

Scientific classification
- Kingdom: Animalia
- Phylum: Arthropoda
- Clade: Pancrustacea
- Class: Insecta
- Order: Odonata
- Suborder: Anisoptera
- Family: Gomphidae
- Genus: Ictinogomphus
- Species: I. australis

Binomial name
- Ictinogomphus australis (Selys, 1873)

Synonyms
- Ictinus australis Selys, 1873

= Ictinogomphus australis =

Species of dragonfly

Ictinogomphus australis, known as the Australian tiger, is a species of dragonfly in the family Gomphidae. It is found near rivers, lagoons, lakes and ponds. They are large dragonflies (wingspan 100mm, length 70mm) with eyes widely spaced on top of the head. They have clear wings and are yellow and black in colour. Males are identified from females by two curved flaps below segment eight of the abdomen. They are found in an arc ranging from about Broome, Western Australia along the north of the continent to Point Hicks on the south-east corner. The taxon has been assessed for the IUCN Red List as being of least concern.

== Etymology ==
The genus name Ictinogomphus is derived from the Greek ἴκτινος (iktinos, "kite"), combined with Gomphus, a genus name derived from the Greek γόμφος (gomphos, "peg" or "nail"). The name likely refers to the large size of the genus, emphasised by the distinctive large flaps near the end of the abdomen in both males and females.

The species name australis is Latin for "southern", in this case referring directly to Australia, where the species was first recorded.

== Gallery ==
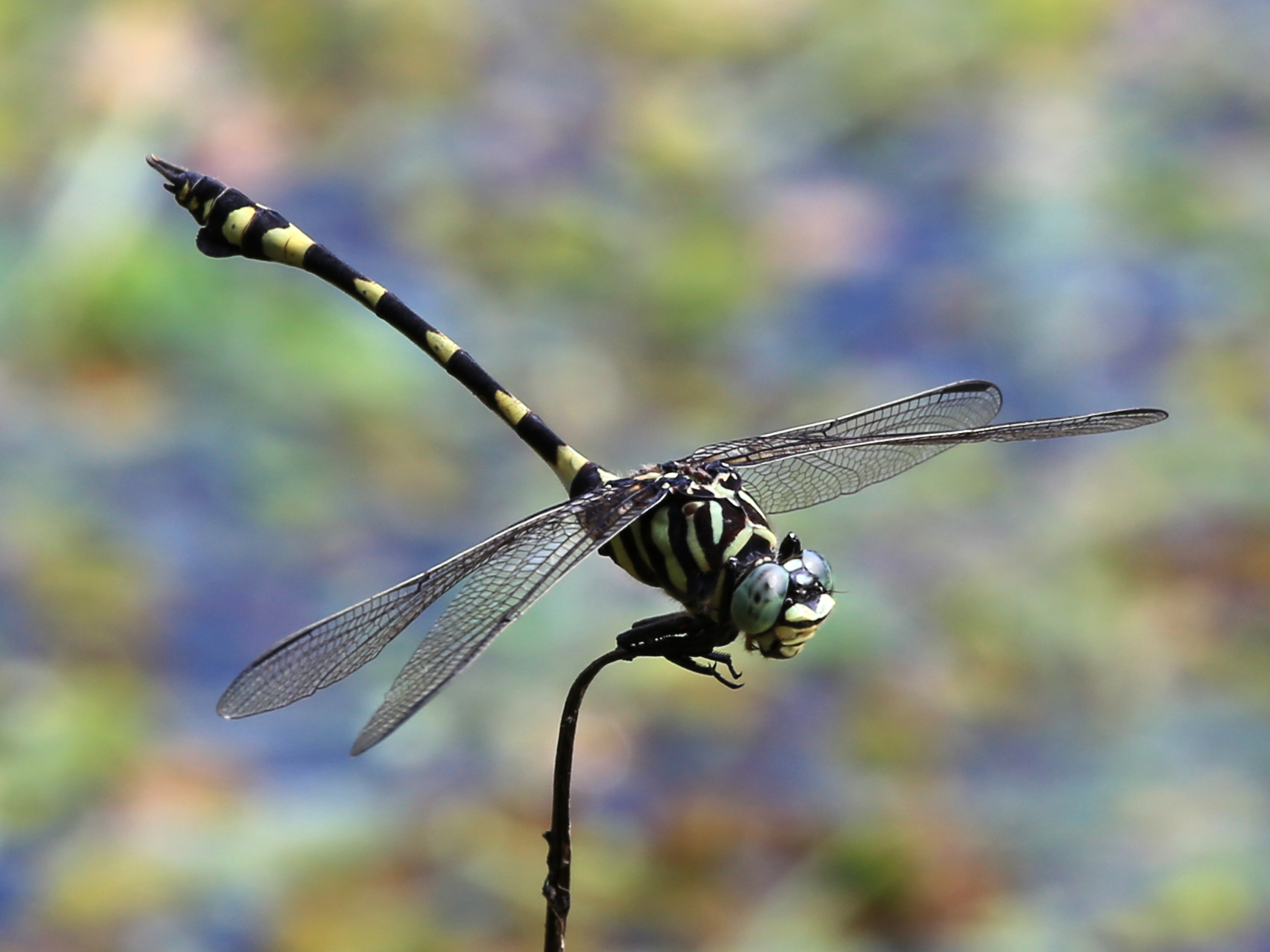
Male

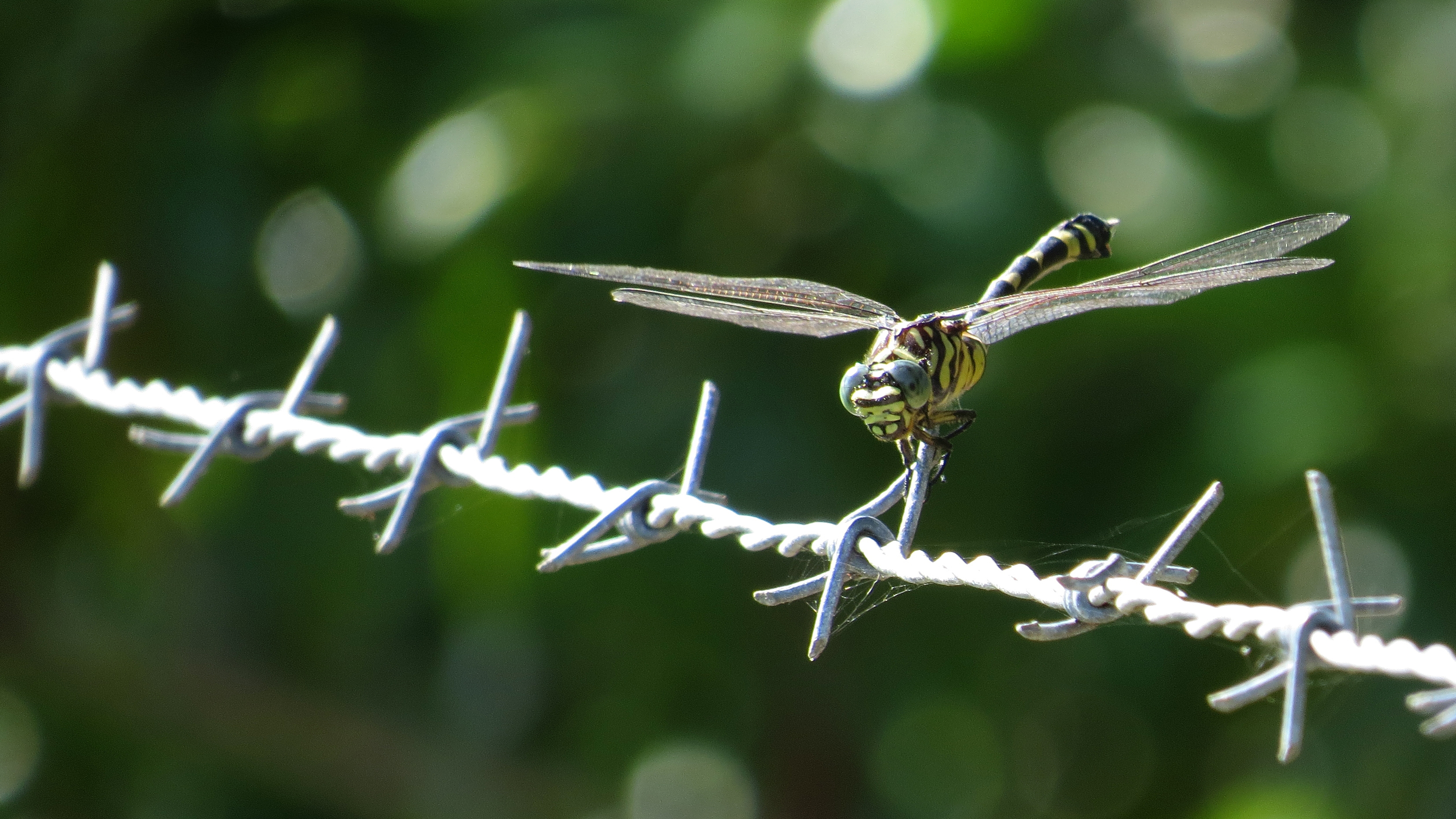
Face

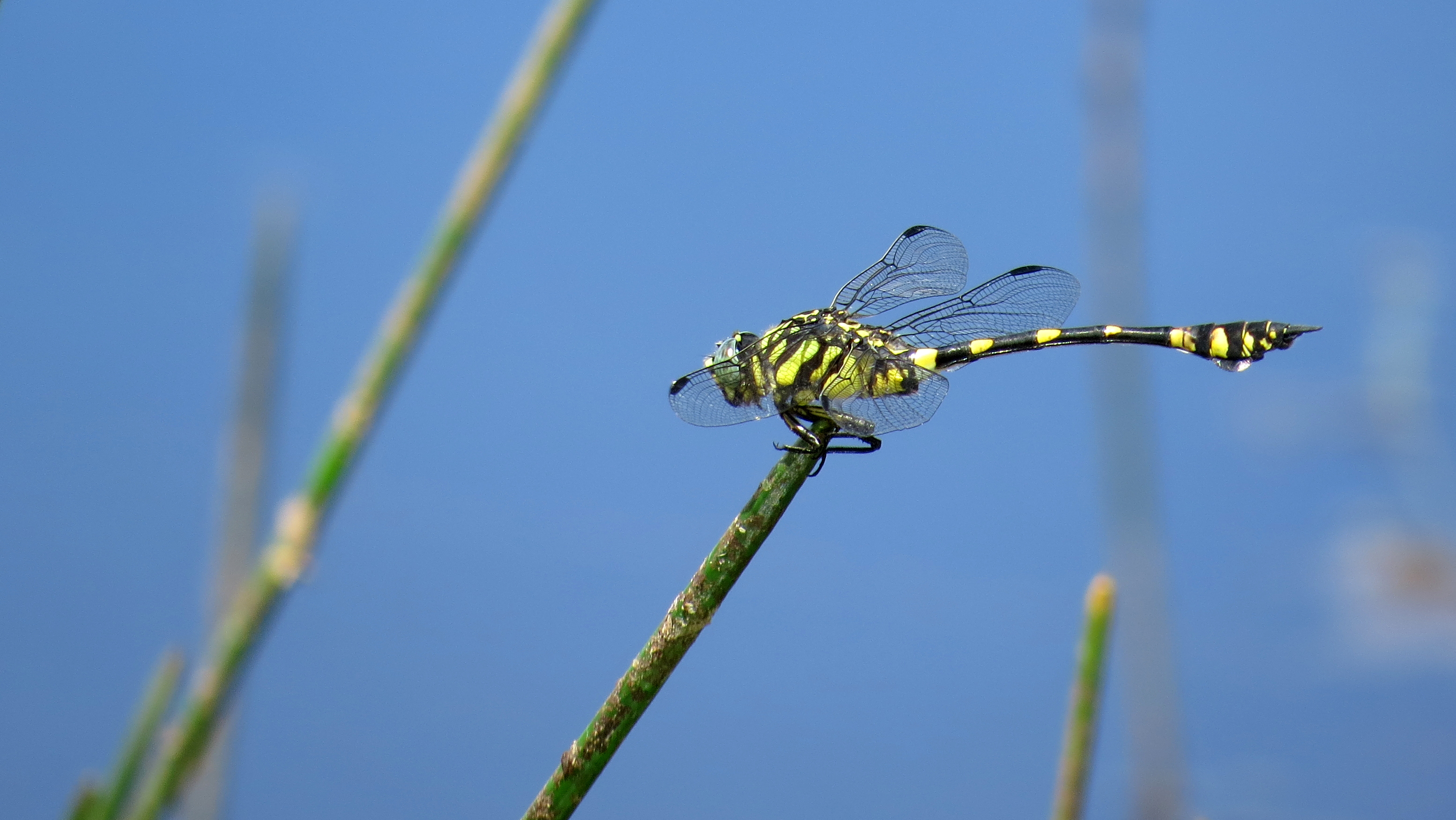
Side view

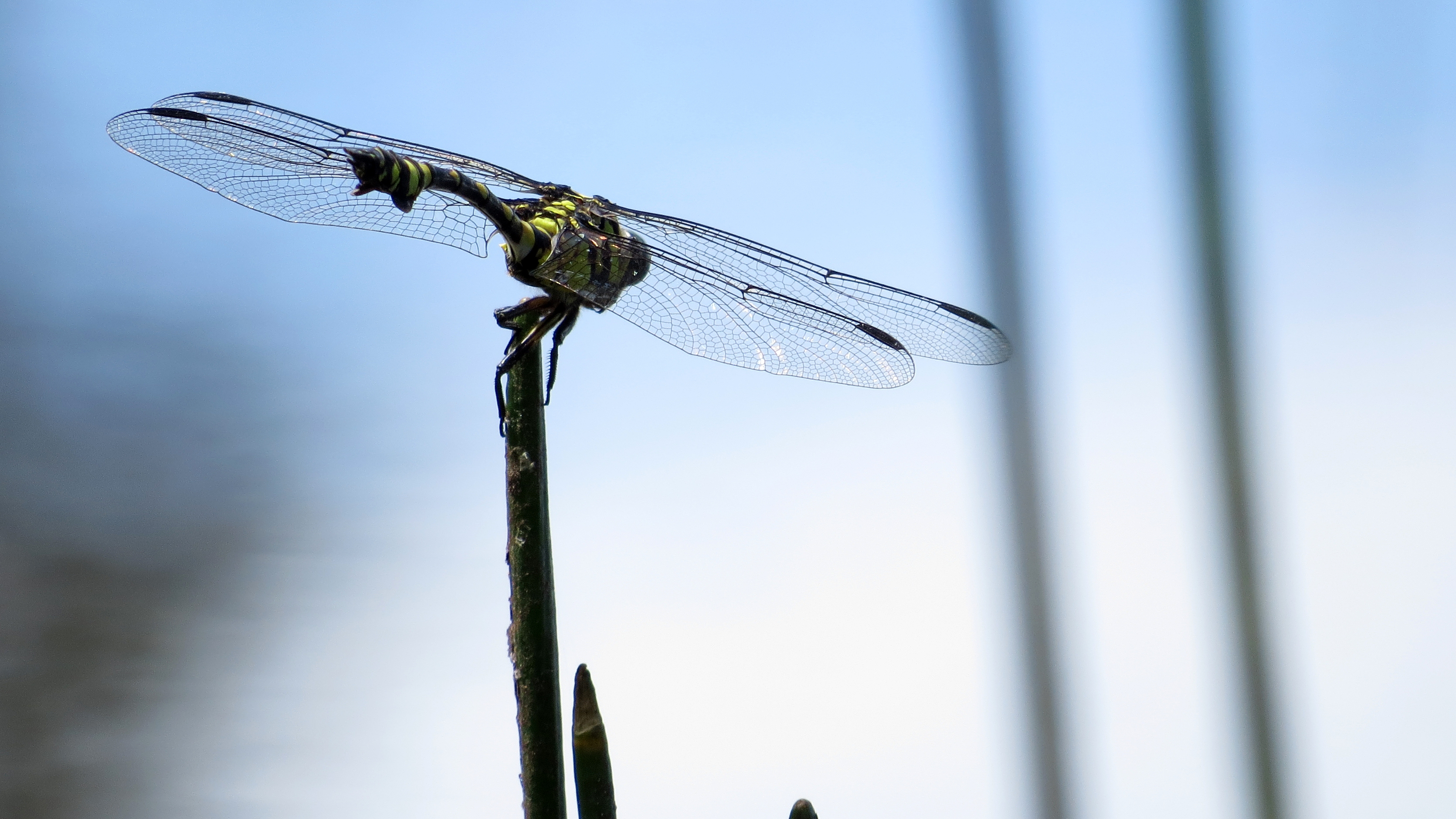
From behind

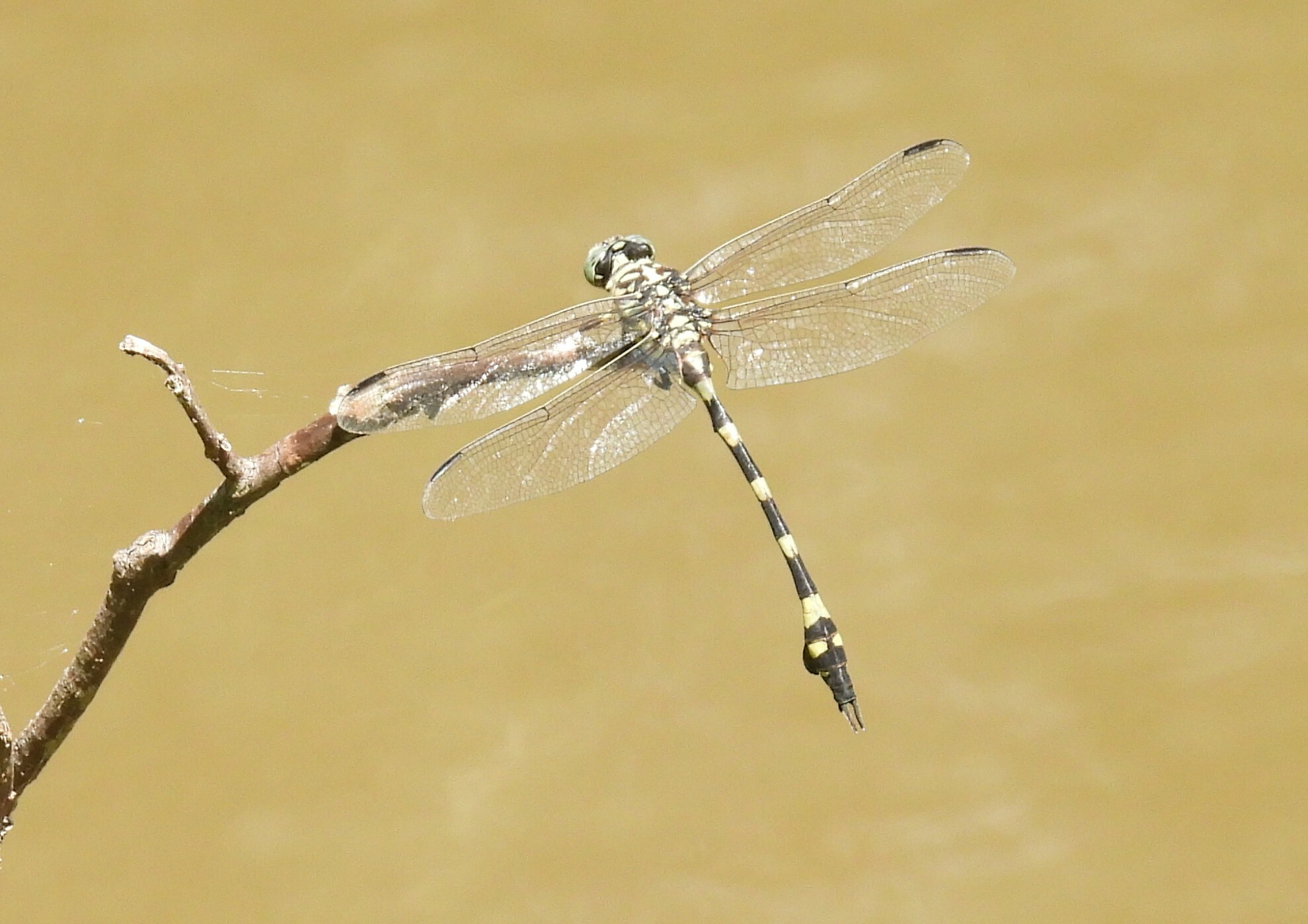
Male

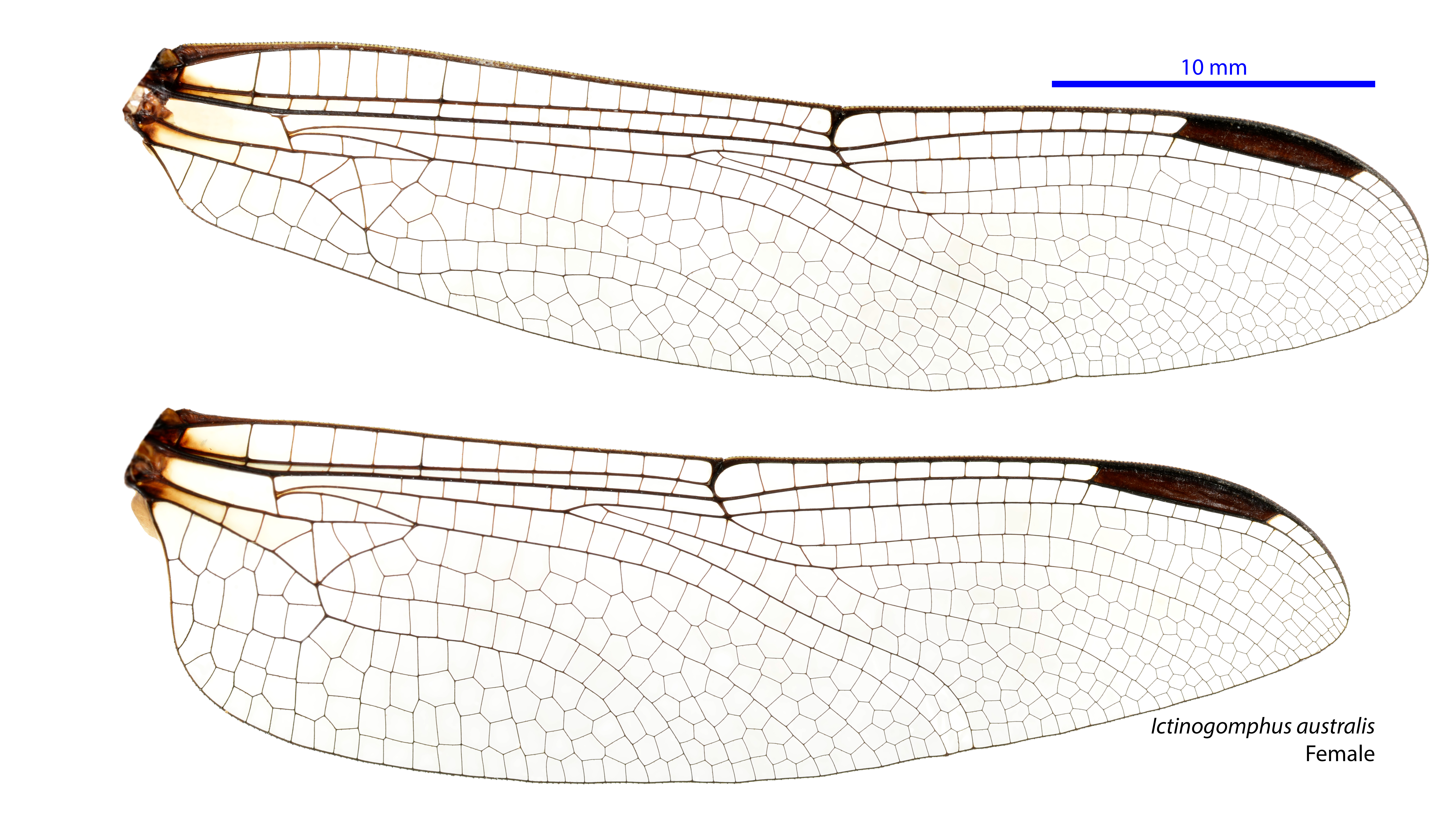
Female wings

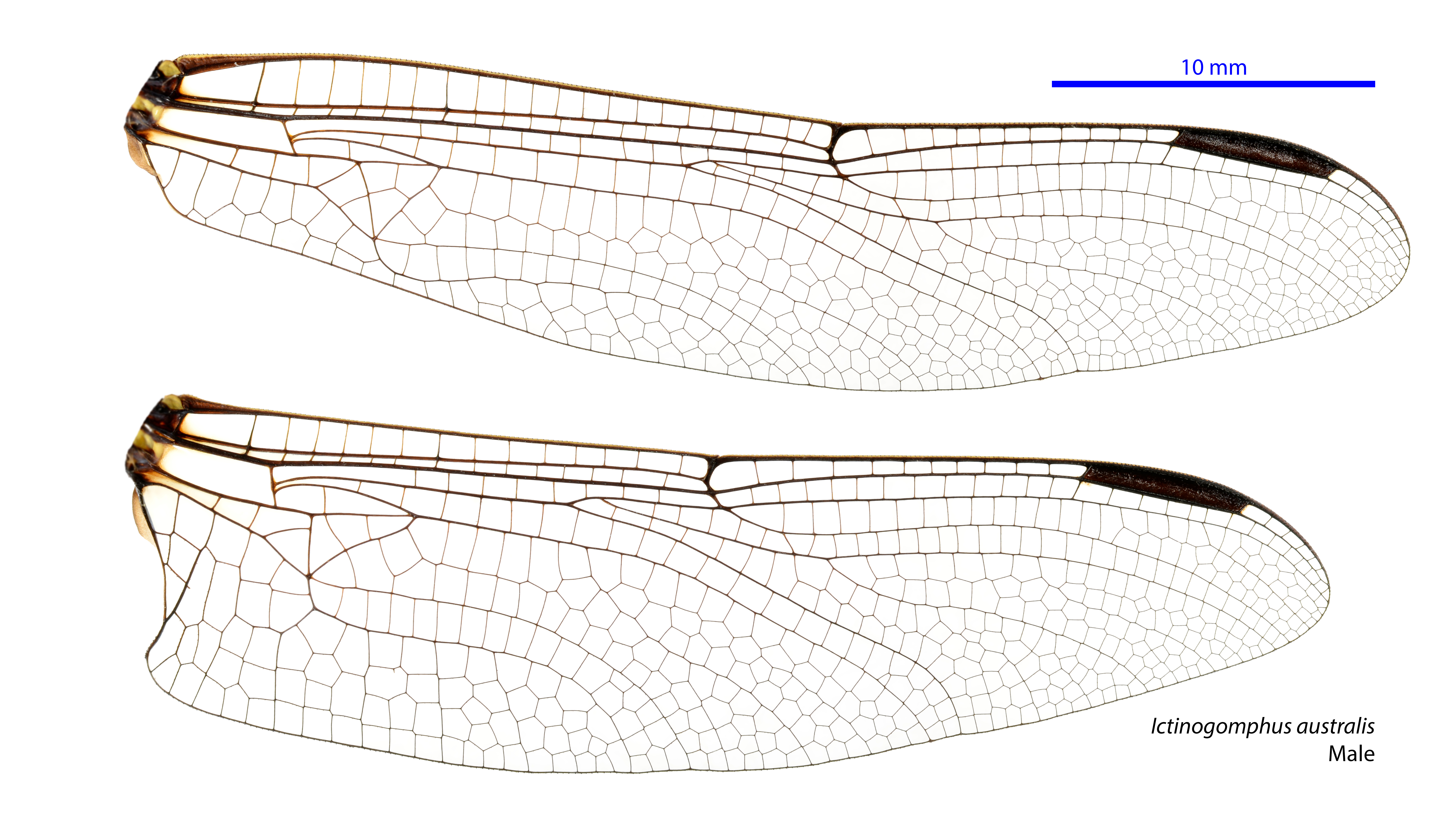
Male wings
