= List of damselflies of the world (Euphaeidae) =

- Anisopleura bipugio
- Anisopleura comes
- Anisopleura furcata
- Anisopleura lestoides
- Anisopleura lieftincki
- Anisopleura qingyuanensis
- Anisopleura subplatystyla
- Anisopleura trulla
- Anisopleura vallei
- Anisopleura yunnanensis
- Anisopleura zhengi
- Bayadera bidentata
- Bayadera brevicauda
- Bayadera continentalis
- Bayadera fasciata
- Bayadera forcipata
- Bayadera hatvan
- Bayadera hyalina
- Bayadera indica
- Bayadera kali
- Bayadera kirbyi
- Bayadera lonicauda
- Bayadera melania
- Bayadera melanopteryx
- Bayadera nephelopennis
- Bayadera serrata
- Bayadera strigata
- Cryptophaea saukra
- Crytophaea vietnamenis
- Crytophaea yunnanensis
- Cyclophaea cyanifrons
- Dysphaea basitincta
- Dysphaea dimidiata
- Dysphaea ethela
- Dysphaea gloriosa
- Dysphaea lugens
- Dysphaea walli
- Epallage fatime
- Euphaea ameeka
- Euphaea amphicyana
- Euphaea aspasia
- Euphaea basalis
- Euphaea bocki
- Euphaea cardinalis
- Euphaea compar
- Euphaea cora
- Euphaea decorata
- Euphaea dispar
- Euphaea formosa
- Euphaea fraseri
- Euphaea guerini
- Euphaea hirta
- Euphaea impar
- Euphaea laidlowi
- Euphaea lara
- Euphaea masoni
- Euphaea modigliani
- Euphaea ochracea
- Euphaea opaca
- Euphaea ornata
- Euphaea pahyapi
- Euphaea refulgens
- Euphaea splendens
- Euphaea subcostalis
- Euphaea subnodalis
- Euphaea superba
- Euphaea tricolor
- Euphaea variegata
- Euphaea yayeyamana
- Heterophaea barbata
- Heterophaea ruficollis
- Schmidtiphaea schmidi
