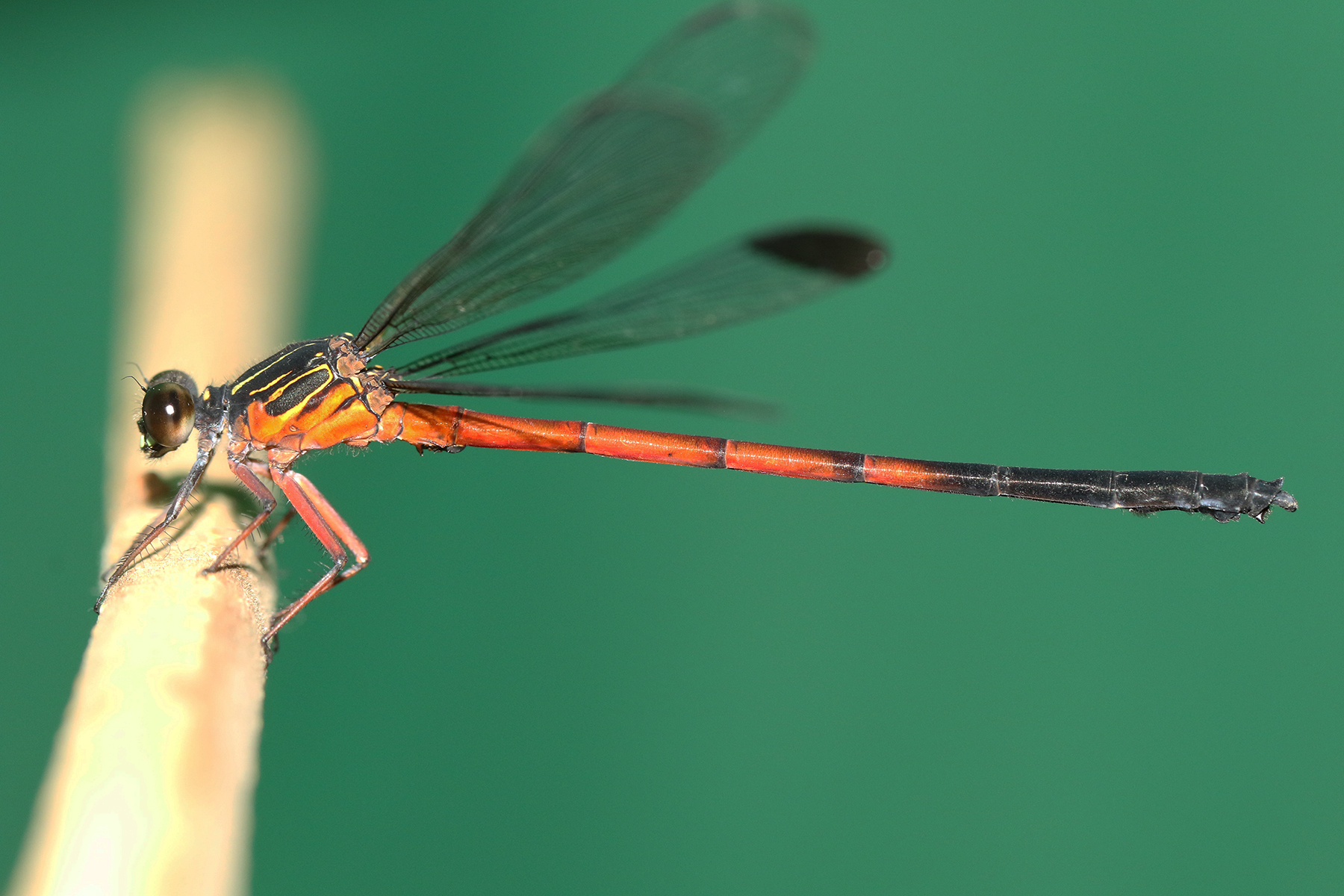
- Male

Scientific classification
- Kingdom: Animalia
- Phylum: Arthropoda
- Clade: Pancrustacea
- Class: Insecta
- Order: Odonata
- Suborder: Zygoptera
- Family: Euphaeidae
- Genus: Euphaea
- Species: E. pseudodispar

Binomial name
- Euphaea pseudodispar Sadasivan & Bhakare, 2021

= Euphaea pseudodispar =

Satara torrent dart

Species of damselfly

Euphaea pseudodispar is a species of damselfly in the family Euphaeidae. The specific name pseudodispar refers to Euphaea dispar, which looks very similar to E. pseudodispar.

== Taxonomy ==
Euphaea pseudodispar was formally described in 2021 by the Indian odonatologists Shriram Bhakare and Kalesh Sadasivan based on an adult male specimen collected from a paddy field near the village of Thoseghar in Maharashtra, India. It is named after its close similarity in appearance to Euphaea dispar.

== Description ==
Euphaea pseudodispar is on the smaller side for species of its genus, with a total length of 47.0 ± 0.70 mm (1.9 ± 0.028 in) in adults. The species also has an abdominal length of 36.5 ± 2.12 mm (1.4 ± 0.083 in), a hindwing length of 32.5 ± 0.70 mm (1.3 ± 0.028 in), and forewing length of 33.0 ± 1.00 mm (1.3 ± 0.039 in). Both the forewings and hindwings are glassy, with the fifth of the hindwings nearest the tip being black in males. The forewing has 17–19 antenodal veins, 26–29 postnodal veins, and a pterostigma width of 9–11 cells. The hindwing has 15–16 antenodal veins, 26–27 postnodal veins, and a pterostigma width of 9–10 cells.

Males are largely red and matte black, while females are pale bluish, yellowish, and black. Males have a turquoise-blue labrum with a narrow black edge and a black patch near the base resembling a "tongue". The genae are light yellowish-white, the middle lobe of the prothorax has yellowish-white dots along the side, and the antehumeral stripe is yellow. The front legs are black, while the remaining legs are red.

== Distribution and conservation ==
This species is endemic to the Western Ghats of India, where it is known from two widely separated high-elevation localities in the states of Maharashtra and Kerala, separated by a distance of around 650 km (400 mi). In Maharashtra, it has been recorded from the district of Satara, where it inhabits streams and riparian habitats at high elevations near the village of Thoseghar and Kaas Lake. In Kerala, it has been documented from along the Kalindi River near the temple town of Thirunelly in northern Wayanad district. It is known from elevations of 1,060–1,124 m (3,480–3,690 ft) in Satara and 850 m (2,790 ft) in Wayanad. It has a flight period of June to September.

Euphaea pseudodispar prefer shallow streams flanked by trees. Males are frequently seen perched on rocks and plants protecting their territories, only leaving these perches to fight other males and scout out females. Females spend the day perched on twigs adjoining streams. Both sexes roost on dry twigs.

== See also ==
- List of odonates of India
- List of odonata of Kerala
