= Cryptophaea =

Cryptophaea is the scientific name of two genera of organisms and may refer to:

- Cryptophaea (damselfly), a genus of insects in the family Euphaeidae
- Cryptophaea (lichen), a genus of fungi in the family Arthoniaceae
