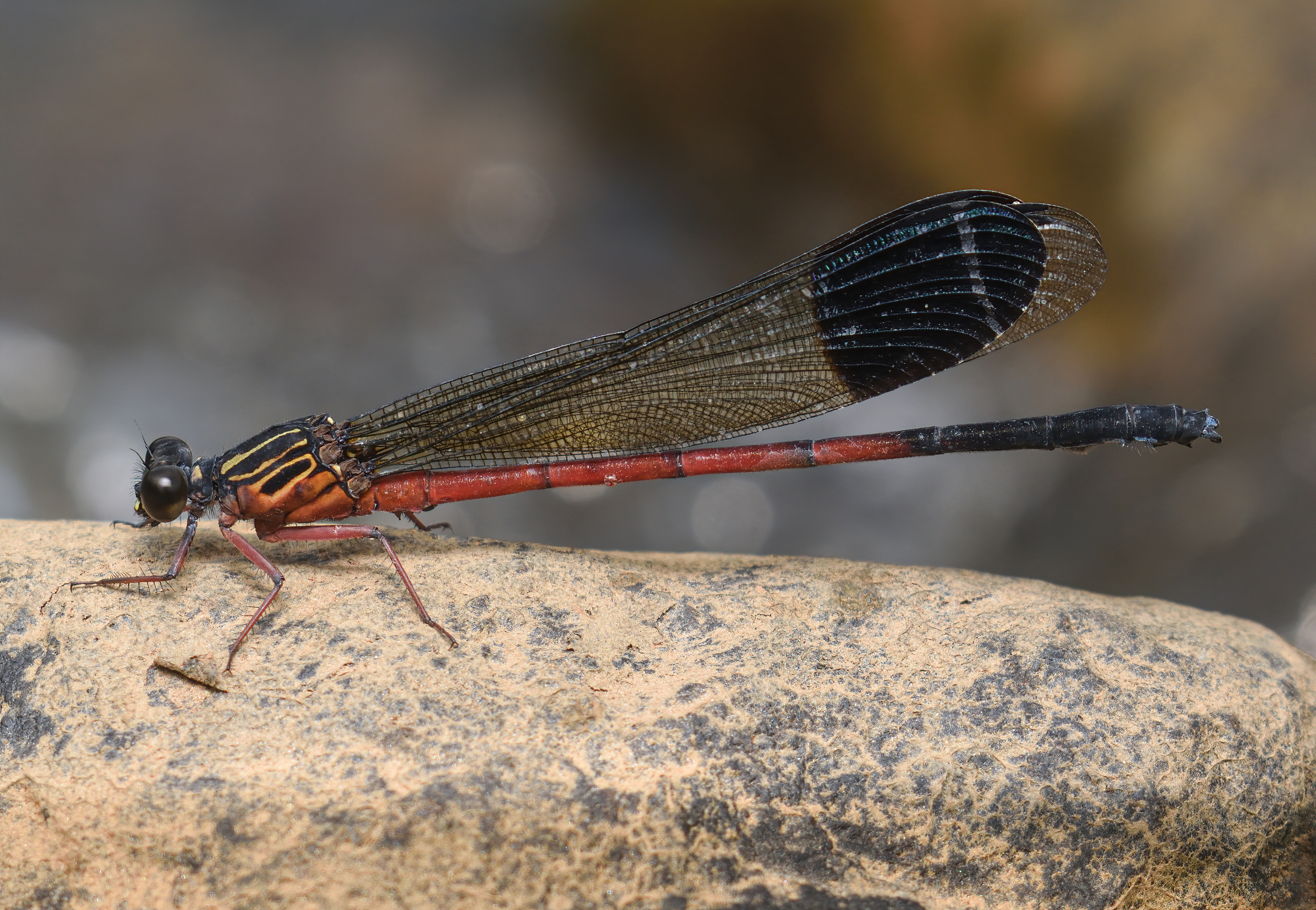

Scientific classification
- Domain: Eukaryota
- Kingdom: Animalia
- Phylum: Arthropoda
- Class: Insecta
- Order: Odonata
- Suborder: Zygoptera
- Family: Euphaeidae
- Genus: Euphaea
- Species: E. wayanadensis

Binomial name
- Euphaea wayanadensis Anooj, Susanth & Sadasivan, 2025

= Euphaea wayanadensis =

Wayanad Damselfly

Species of damselfly

Euphaea wayanadensis, the wayanad damselfly, is a species of damselfly in the family Euphaeidae. The species name wayanadensis is an adjectival toponym derived from the type locality in Wayanad District, Kerala, India.

This species is endemic to the Western Ghats, known to occur only in the fast-flowing streams and riparian patches of Kerala, Wayanad district around Thirunelli. Other specimens were found in Kannur district, in Aaralam.

== See also ==
- List of odonates of India
- List of odonata of Kerala
