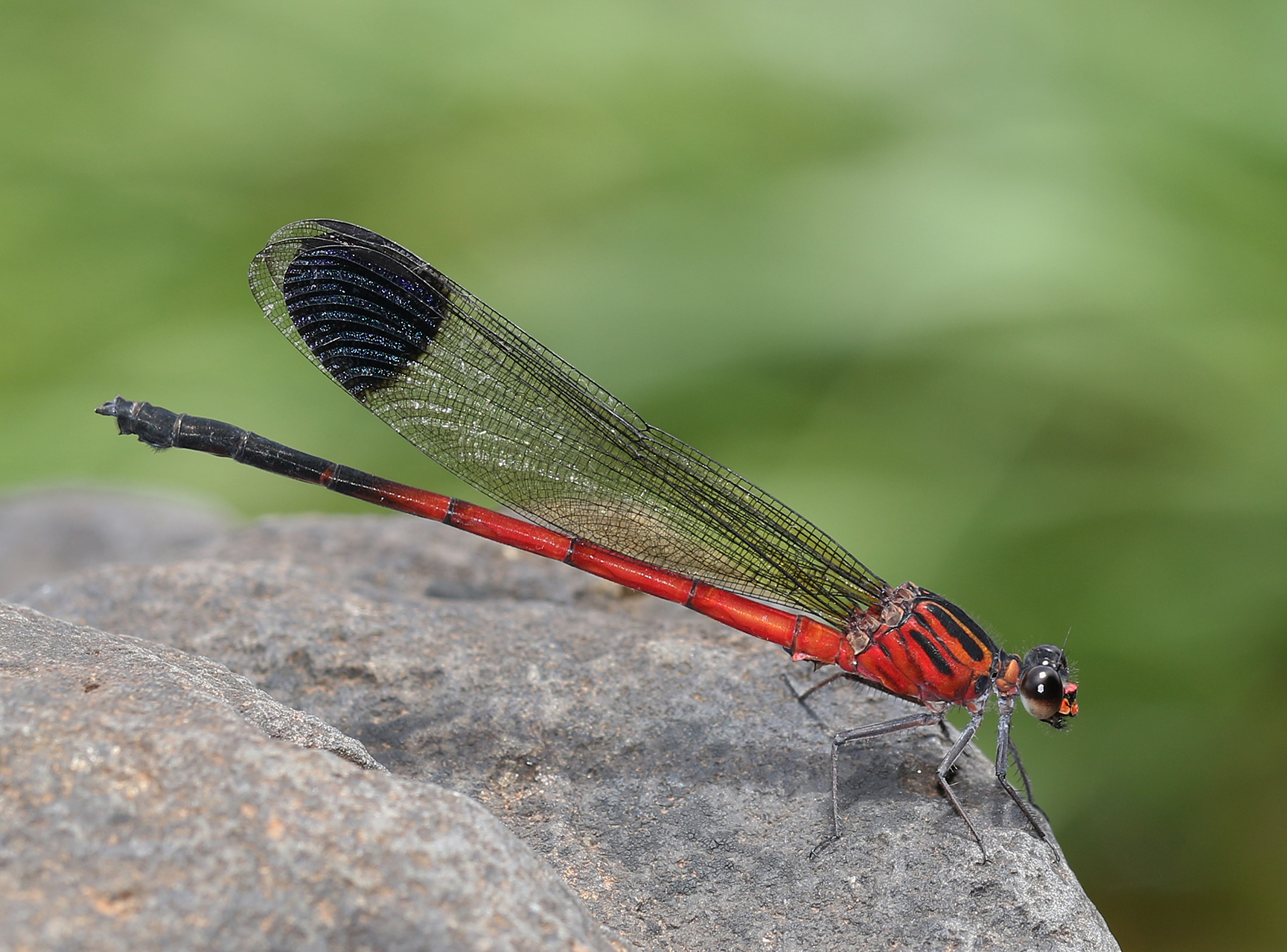
- Male

Scientific classification
- Kingdom: Animalia
- Phylum: Arthropoda
- Clade: Pancrustacea
- Class: Insecta
- Order: Odonata
- Suborder: Zygoptera
- Family: Euphaeidae
- Genus: Euphaea
- Species: E. thosegharensis

Binomial name
- Euphaea thosegharensis Sadasivan & Bhakare, 2021

= Euphaea thosegharensis =

Species of damselfly

Euphaea thosegharensis is a species of damselfly in the family Euphaeidae. The species name thosegharensis is a toponym derived from the type locality in Thoseghar, Satara district, Maharashtra, India.

== Taxonomy ==
Euphaea thosegharensis was formally described in 2021 by the Indian odonatologists Shriram Bhakare and Kalesh Sadasivan based on an adult male specimen collected from a paddy field near the village of Thoseghar in Maharashtra, India. It is named after the village.

== Description ==
Euphaea thosegharensis is on the larger side for species of its genus, with a total length of 50.6 ± 2.10 mm (2.0 ± 0.083 in) in adults. The species also has an abdominal length of 39.5 ± 0.71 mm (1.6 ± 0.028 in), a hindwing length of 34.5 ± 0.70 mm (1.4 ± 0.028 in), and forewing length of 37.3 ± 2.30 mm (1.5 ± 0.091 in). Both the forewings and hindwings are glassy, with the fourth of the hindwings nearest the tip being black in males. The forewing has 20–25 antenodal veins, 35–36 postnodal veins, and a pterostigma width of 9–11 cells. The hindwing has 17–19 antenodal veins, 29–31 postnodal veins, and a pterostigma width of 9–11 cells.

Males are largely red and matte black, while females are pale greenish, yellowish, and black. Males have a reddish-orange labrum with a faint darker stripe along the centre. The genae are reddish-orange, the middle lobe of the prothorax has pinkish-red dots along the side, and the antehumeral stripe is orangish-red. The legs are wholly black.

== Distribution and conservation ==
This species is endemic to the Western Ghats of India, where it is known from high-elevation localities in the states of Maharashtra. It has been recorded from the district of Satara, where it inhabits streams and riparian habitats at high elevations near the villages of Thoseghar and Chikhali, as well as Kaas Lake. It is known from elevations of 1,060–1,124 m (3,480–3,690 ft). It has a flight period of April to August.

Euphaea thosegharensis prefer shallow streams flanked by trees. Males are frequently seen perched on rocks and plants protecting their territories, only leaving these perches to fight other males and scout out females. Females spend the day perched on twigs adjoining streams. Both sexes roost on dry twigs.

== See also ==
- List of odonates of India
- List of odonata of Kerala
