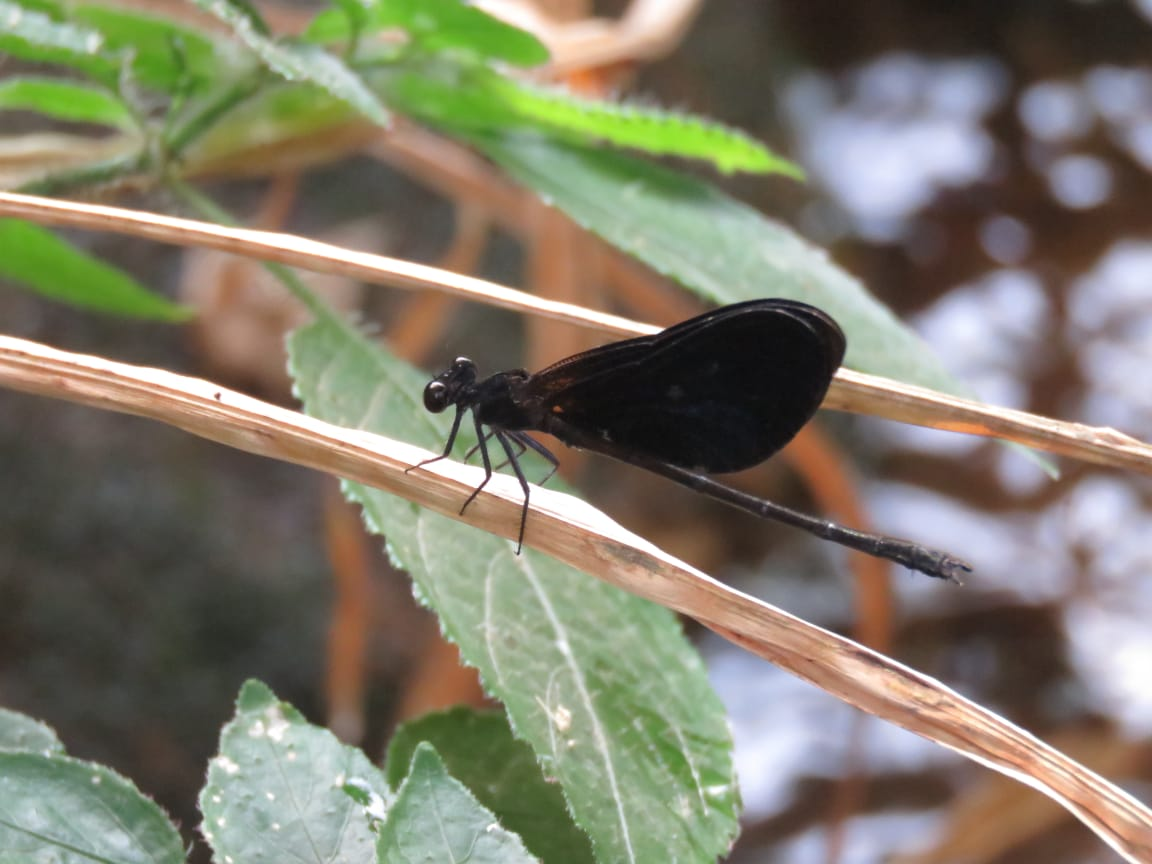

Conservation status
- Least Concern (IUCN 3.1)

Scientific classification
- Kingdom: Animalia
- Phylum: Arthropoda
- Clade: Pancrustacea
- Class: Insecta
- Order: Odonata
- Suborder: Zygoptera
- Family: Euphaeidae
- Genus: Euphaea
- Species: E. splendens

Binomial name
- Euphaea splendens Hagen, 1853

= Euphaea splendens =

Shining gossamerwing

Species of damselfly

Euphaea splendens, the shining gossamerwing, is a species of damselfly belonging to the Euphaeidae family. It is endemic to Sri Lanka.
