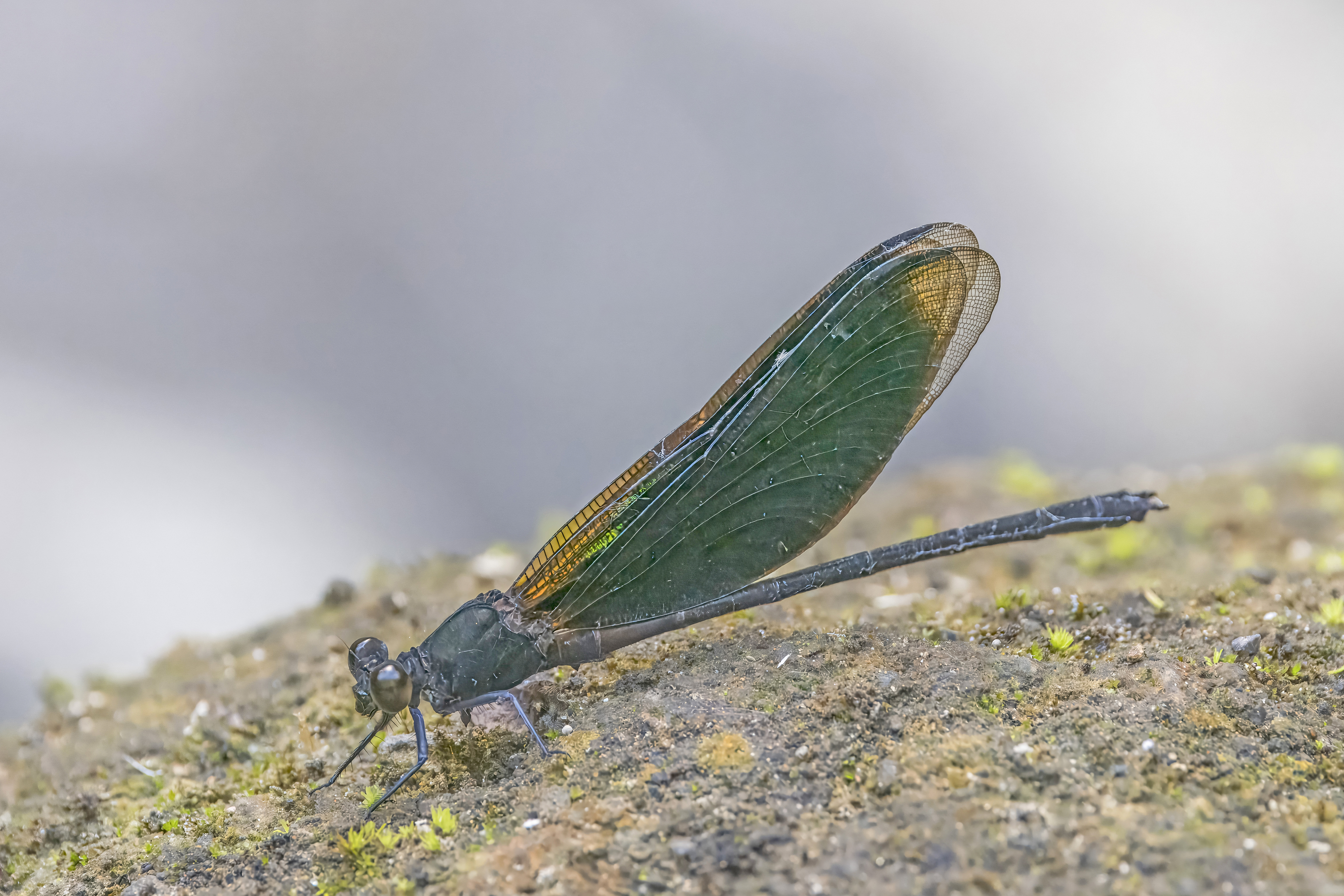
- E. refulgens, male, Philippines

Scientific classification
- Kingdom: Animalia
- Phylum: Arthropoda
- Clade: Pancrustacea
- Class: Insecta
- Order: Odonata
- Suborder: Zygoptera
- Family: Euphaeidae
- Subfamily: Euphaeinae
- Genus: Euphaea; Selys, 1840

= Euphaea =

Genus of damselflies

Euphaea is a genus of damselflies in the family Euphaeidae. There are more than 30 described species in Euphaea, found mainly in Indomalaya.

== Species ==
These species belong to the genus Euphaea:

- Euphaea ameeka van Tol & Norma-Rashid, 1995
- Euphaea amphicyana Ris, 1930
- Euphaea aspasia Selys, 1853
- Euphaea basalis (Laidlaw, 1915)
- Euphaea bocki McLachlan, 1880
- Euphaea cardinalis (Fraser, 1924)
- Euphaea cora Ris, 1930
- Euphaea cyanopogon Hämäläinen, Kosterin & Kompier, 2019
- Euphaea decorata Hagen in Selys, 1853 (black-banded gossamerwing)
- Euphaea dispar Rambur, 1842 (nilgiri torrent dart)
- Euphaea formosa Hagen in Selys, 1869
- Euphaea fraseri (Laidlaw, 1920)
- Euphaea refulgens Hagen in Selys, 1853
- Euphaea guerini Rambur, 1842
- Euphaea hirta Hämäläinen & Karube, 2001
- Euphaea impar Selys, 1859 (blue-sided satinwing)
- Euphaea inouei Asahina, 1977
- Euphaea lara Krüger, 1898
- Euphaea masoni Selys, 1879
- Euphaea modigliani Selys, 1898
- Euphaea ochracea Selys, 1859
- Euphaea opaca Selys, 1853 (sooty gossamerwing)
- Euphaea ornata (Campion, 1924)
- Euphaea pahyapi Hämäläinen, 1985
- Euphaea pseudodispar Sadasivan & Bhakare, 2021
- Euphaea refulgens Hagen in Selys, 1853
- Euphaea sanguinea Kompier & Hayashi, 2018
- Euphaea saola Phan & Hayashi, 2018
- Euphaea splendens Hagen in Selys, 1853
- Euphaea subcostalis Selys, 1873
- Euphaea subnodalis (Laidlaw, 1915)
- Euphaea superba Kimmins, 1936
- Euphaea thosegharensis Sadasivan & Bhakare, 2021
- Euphaea tricolor Selys, 1859
- Euphaea variegata Rambur, 1842
- Euphaea wayanadensis Anooj, Susanth, & Sadasivan, 2025
- Euphaea yayeyamana Matsumura & Oguma, 1913
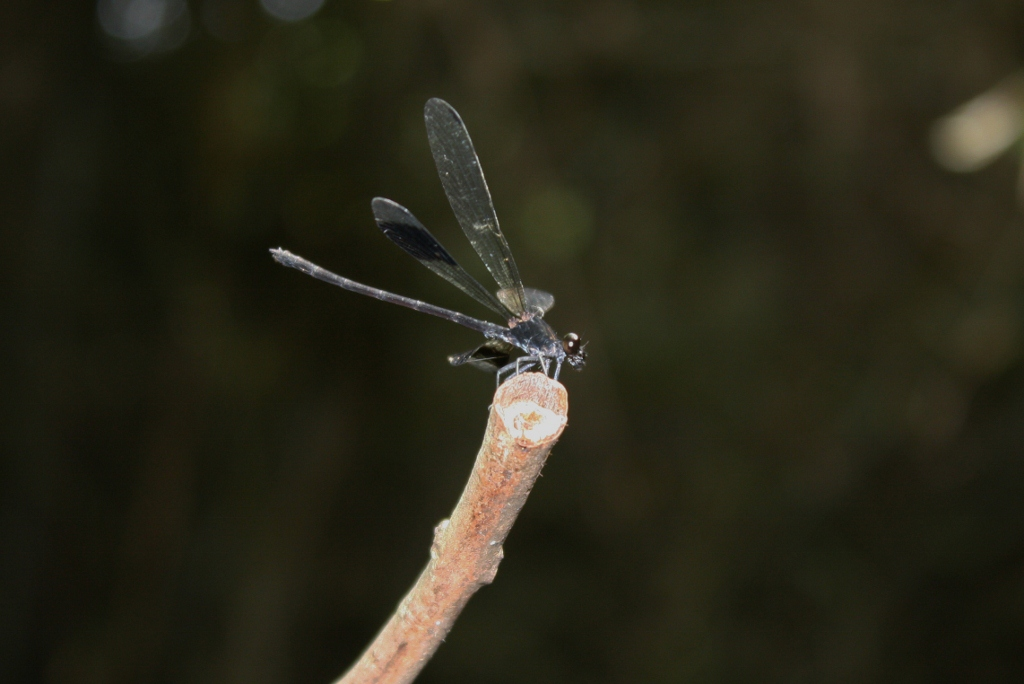
E. decorata

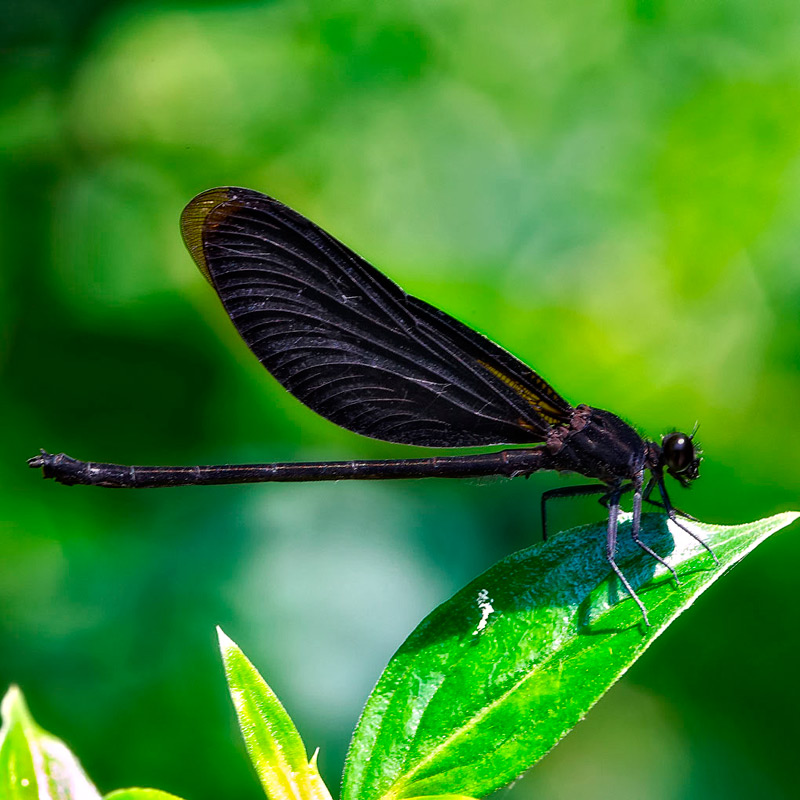
E. masoni
