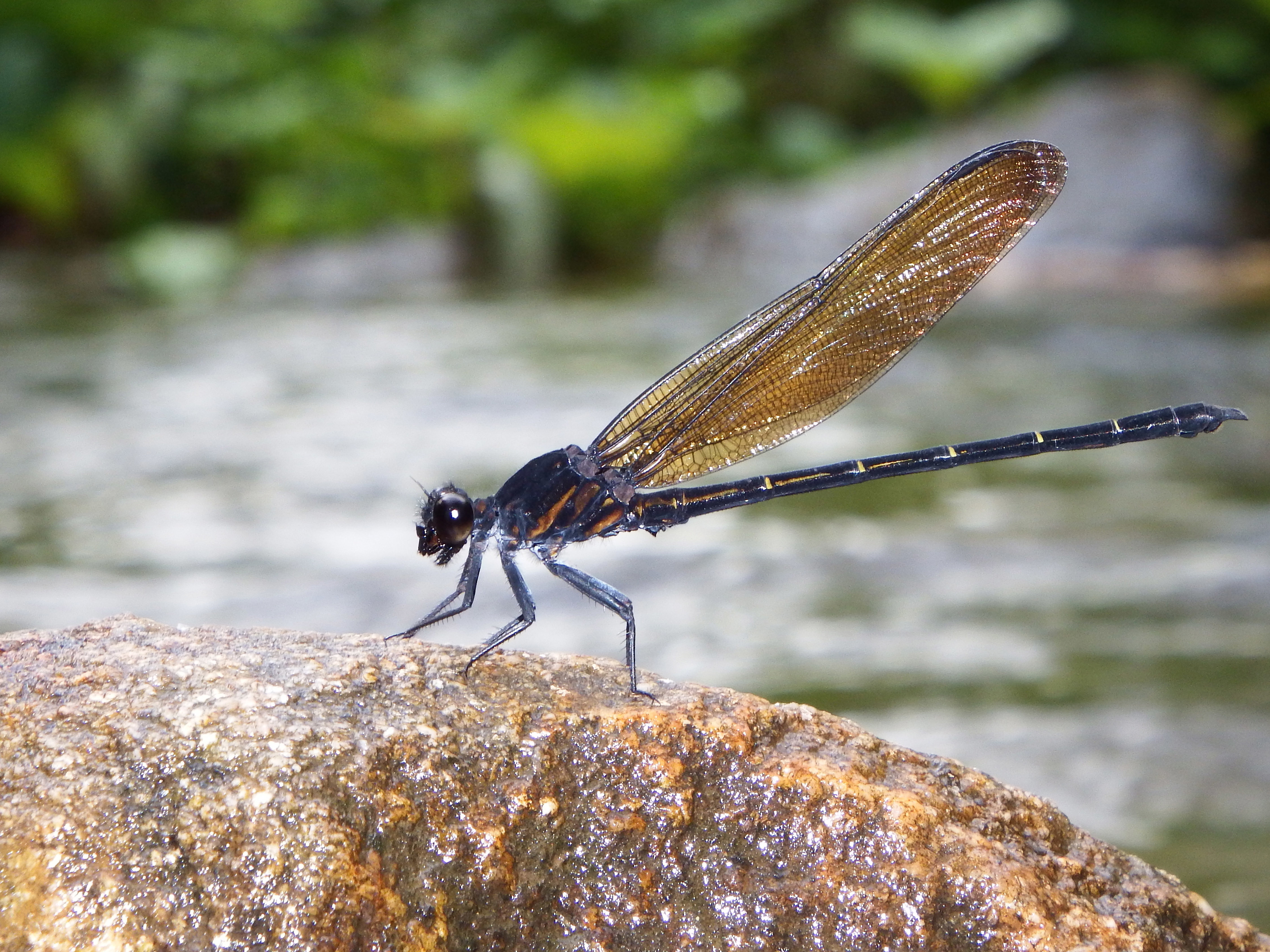
- Dysphaea ethela

Scientific classification
- Kingdom: Animalia
- Phylum: Arthropoda
- Class: Insecta
- Order: Odonata
- Suborder: Zygoptera
- Family: Euphaeidae
- Subfamily: Euphaeinae
- Genus: Dysphaea; Selys, 1853

= Dysphaea =

Genus of damselflies

Dysphaea is a genus of Asian damselflies in the family Euphaeidae and subfamily Euphaeinae, erected by Edmond de Sélys Longchamps in 1853. Species have been recorded from South- and South-East Asia.

== Species ==
The Global Biodiversity Information Facility lists:

1. Dysphaea basitincta Martin, 1904
2. Dysphaea dimidiata Selys, 1853
3. Dysphaea ethela Fraser, 1924
4. Dysphaea gloriosa Fraser, 1938
5. Dysphaea haomiao Hämäläinen, 2012
6. Dysphaea lugens Selys, 1873
7. Dysphaea ulu Hämäläinen, Dow & Stokvis, 2015
8. Dysphaea vanida Hämäläinen, Dow & Stokvis, 2015
9. Dysphaea walli Fraser, 1927
