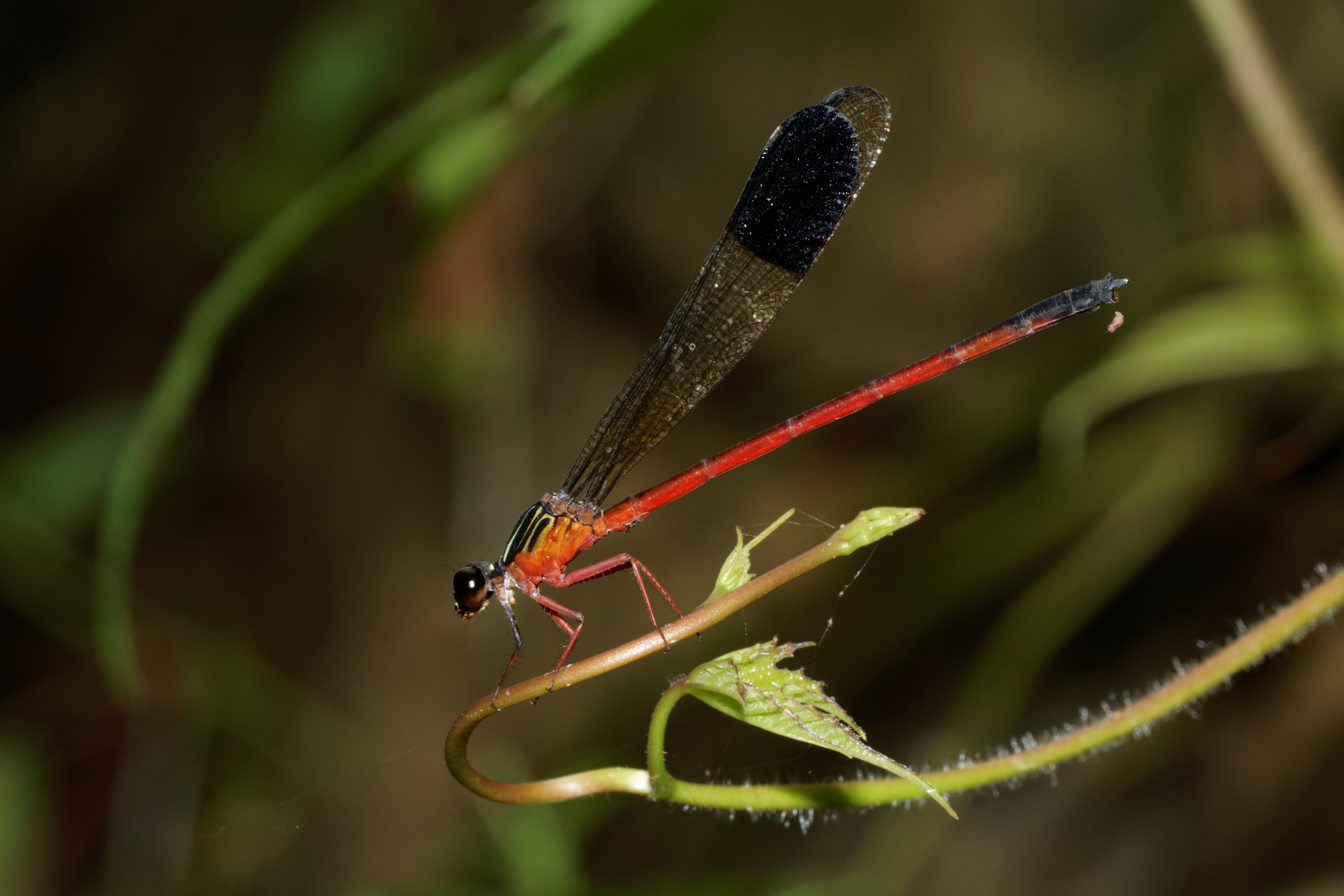
- Male
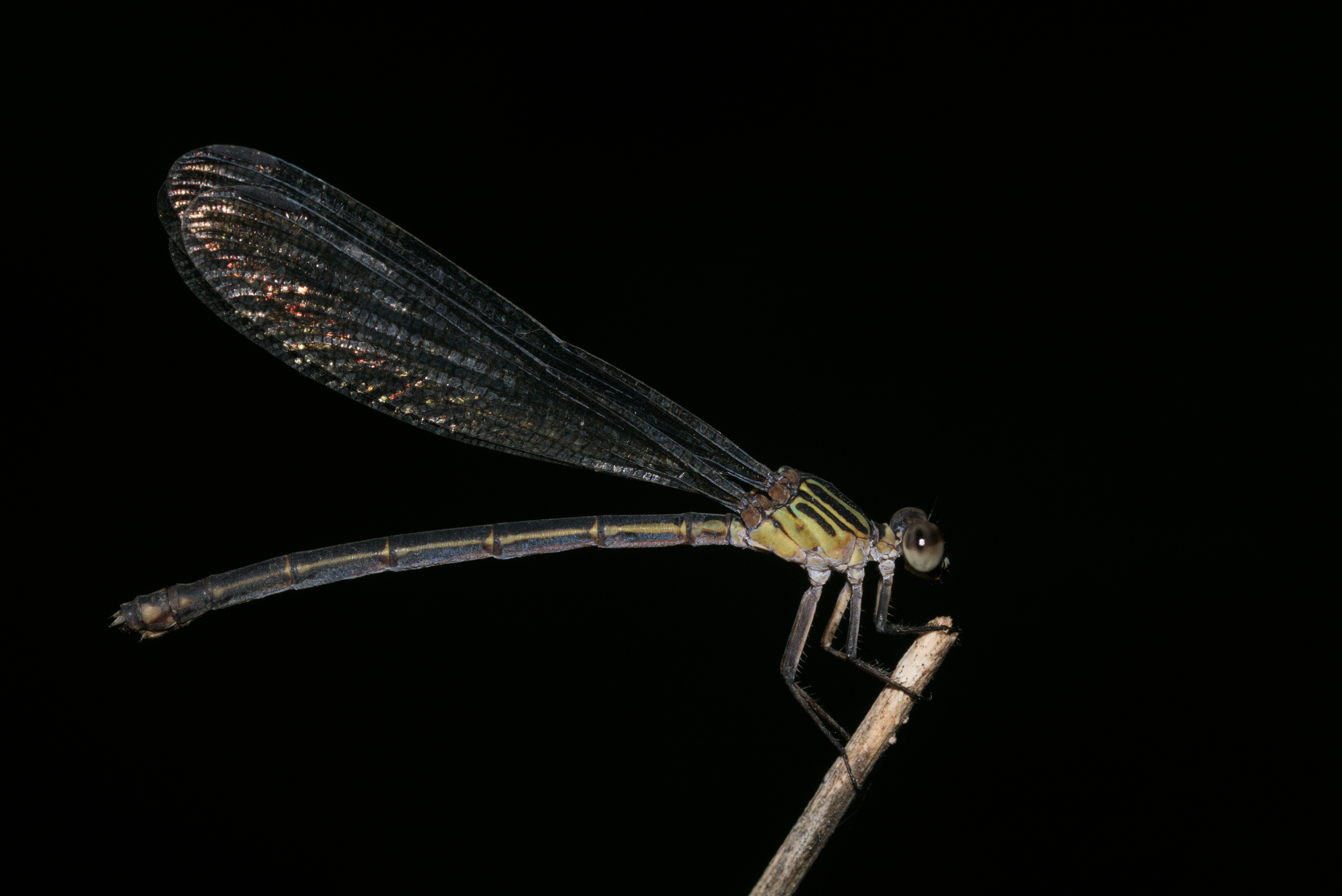
- Female

Conservation status
- Least Concern (IUCN 3.1)

Scientific classification
- Kingdom: Animalia
- Phylum: Arthropoda
- Clade: Pancrustacea
- Class: Insecta
- Order: Odonata
- Suborder: Zygoptera
- Family: Euphaeidae
- Genus: Euphaea
- Species: E. fraseri

Binomial name
- Euphaea fraseri (Laidlaw,1920)

Synonyms
- Pseudoeuphaea wynaadensis; Fraser, 1922: Pseudophaea fraseri Laidlow, 1920

= Euphaea fraseri =

Malabar torrent dart

Species of damselfly

Euphaea fraseri, Malabar torrent dart, is a species of damselfly in the family Euphaeidae. This species is endemic to the Western Ghats and the Eastern Ghats; known to occur in various locations up to coastal Maharashtra.

== Description and habitat ==
It is a medium-sized damselfly with black head and brown-capped pale grey eyes. Its thorax is black, marked with sky-blue antehumeral and reddish-yellow humeral stripes. Lateral sides of the thorax in the base is red. Legs are red as in Euphaea cardinalis; but first pair is dark. Wings are narrower than Euphaea cardinalis; hind-wings are shorter than fore-wings. Fore-wings are transparent, merely infused with brown on the apices. Hind-wings are transparent; but one third of the wings from the apices are broadly black. Abdomen is bright red up to the segment 7; apical third of segment 7 to the end segment are black. Anal appendages are black.

Female is short and robust; the ochreous-red of male is replaced with yellow colors. All wings are transparent, infused with black in adults. Abdomen is black with yellow lateral stripes up to segment 6. The yellow lateral stripes continued to segment 7. Segment 8 has a narrow and 9 has a broad yellow apical annule, covering dorsal half.

They breed in hill streams but at a lower elevation. Males usually found on low herbage along the banks or middle of the streams.

== See also ==
- List of odonates of India
- List of odonata of Kerala
