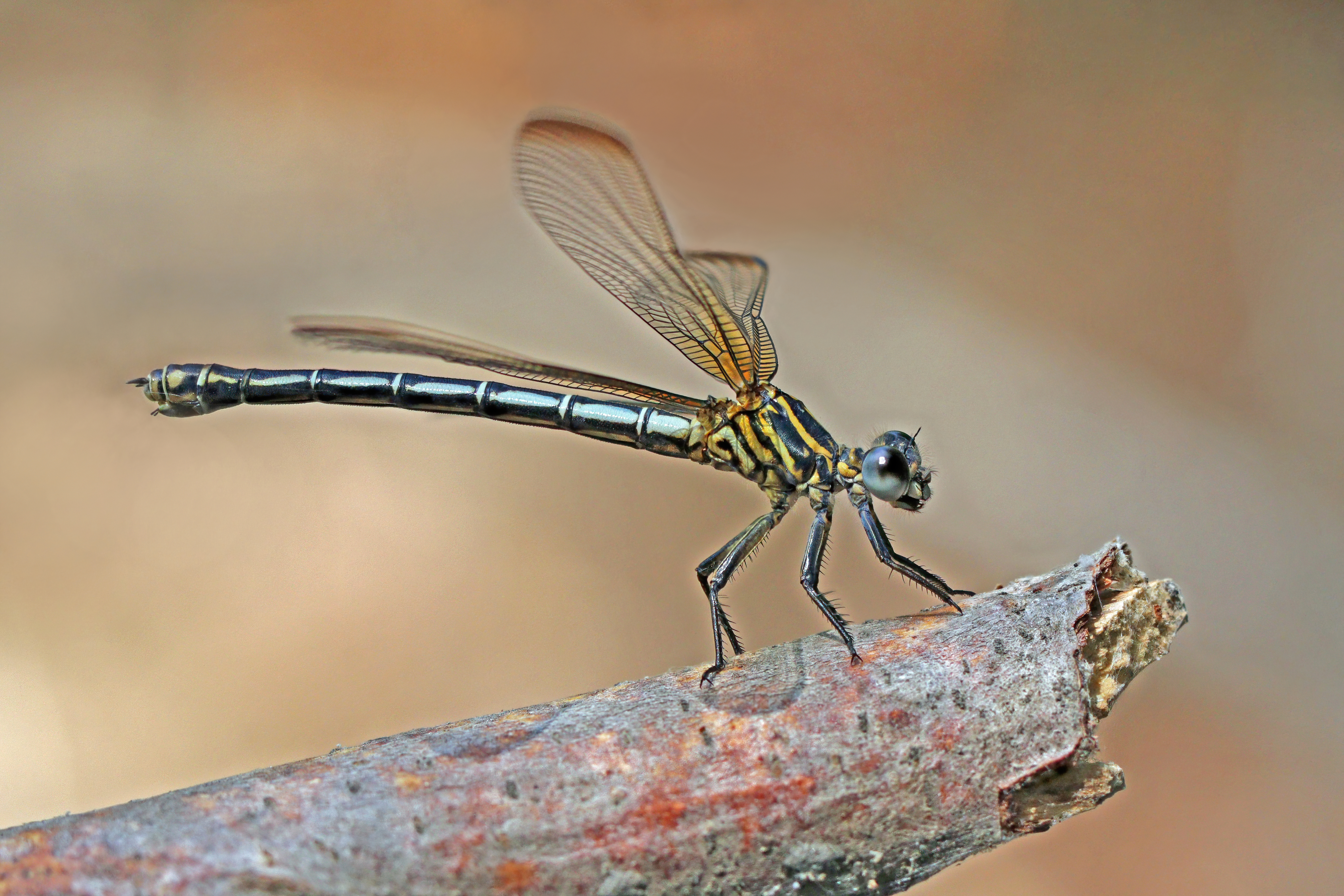
- Epallage fatime

Scientific classification
- Kingdom: Animalia
- Phylum: Arthropoda
- Class: Insecta
- Order: Odonata
- Suborder: Zygoptera
- Family: Euphaeidae
- Genus: Epallage; Charpentier, 1840

= Epallage =

Genus of damselflies

Epallage is a genus of damselflies in the family Euphaeidae. It contains one species, E. fatime.
