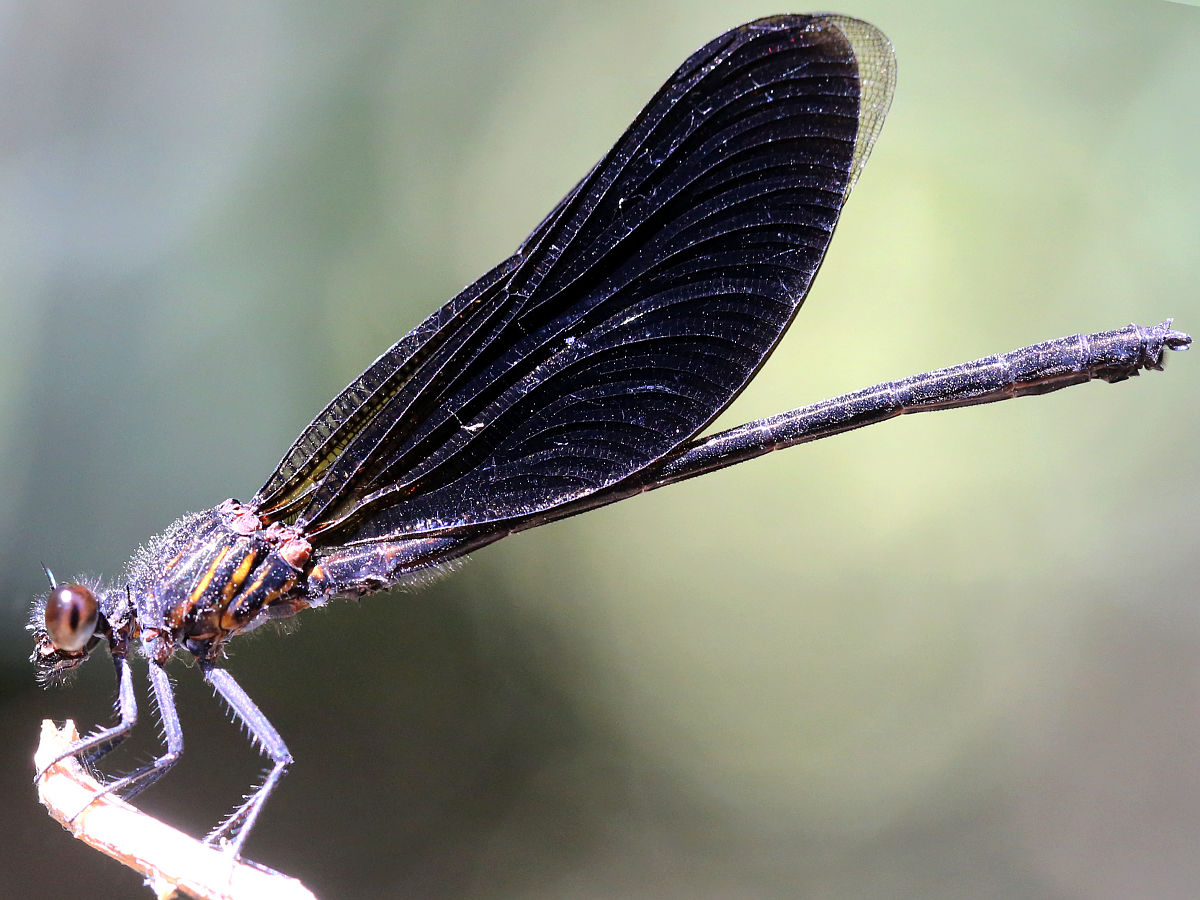
- Male
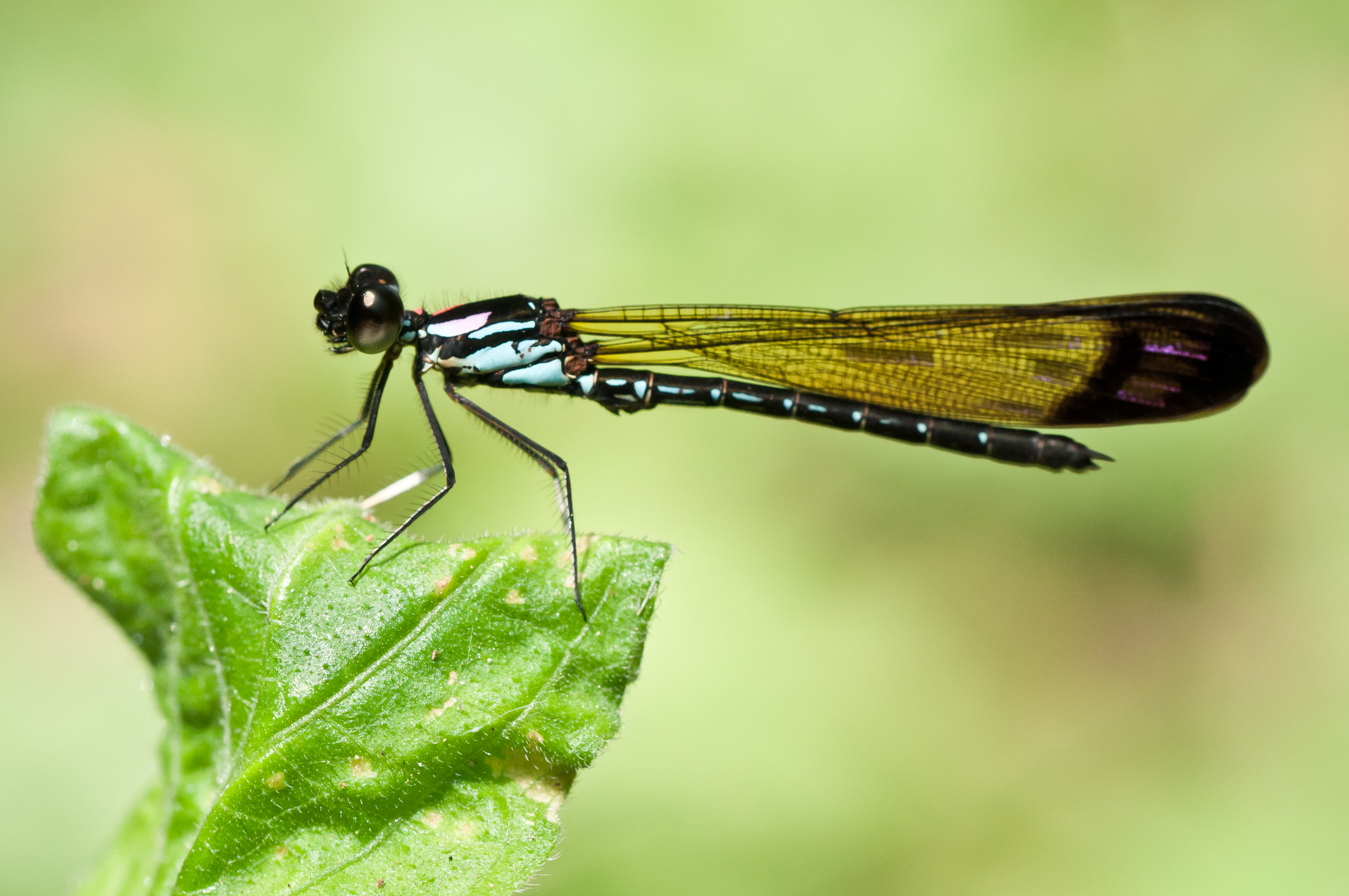
- Female

Conservation status
- Least Concern (IUCN 3.1)

Scientific classification
- Kingdom: Animalia
- Phylum: Arthropoda
- Clade: Pancrustacea
- Class: Insecta
- Order: Odonata
- Suborder: Zygoptera
- Family: Euphaeidae
- Genus: Euphaea
- Species: E. masoni

Binomial name
- Euphaea masoni Selys, 1879

= Euphaea masoni =

Species of damselfly

Euphaea masoni is a species of damselfly in the family Euphaeidae, the gossamerwings.

== Description ==
The male is almost entirely black, including its wings. The female has lighter colored wings.

== Range ==
Euphaea masoni is found mostly in Southeast Asia, including southern China, India, Laos, Myanmar, Thailand, Vietnam.

== Ecology ==
It is found near streams. Phoretic associations between larvae of Nanocladius asiaticus (Diptera, Chironomidae) and Euphaea masoni have been reported.
