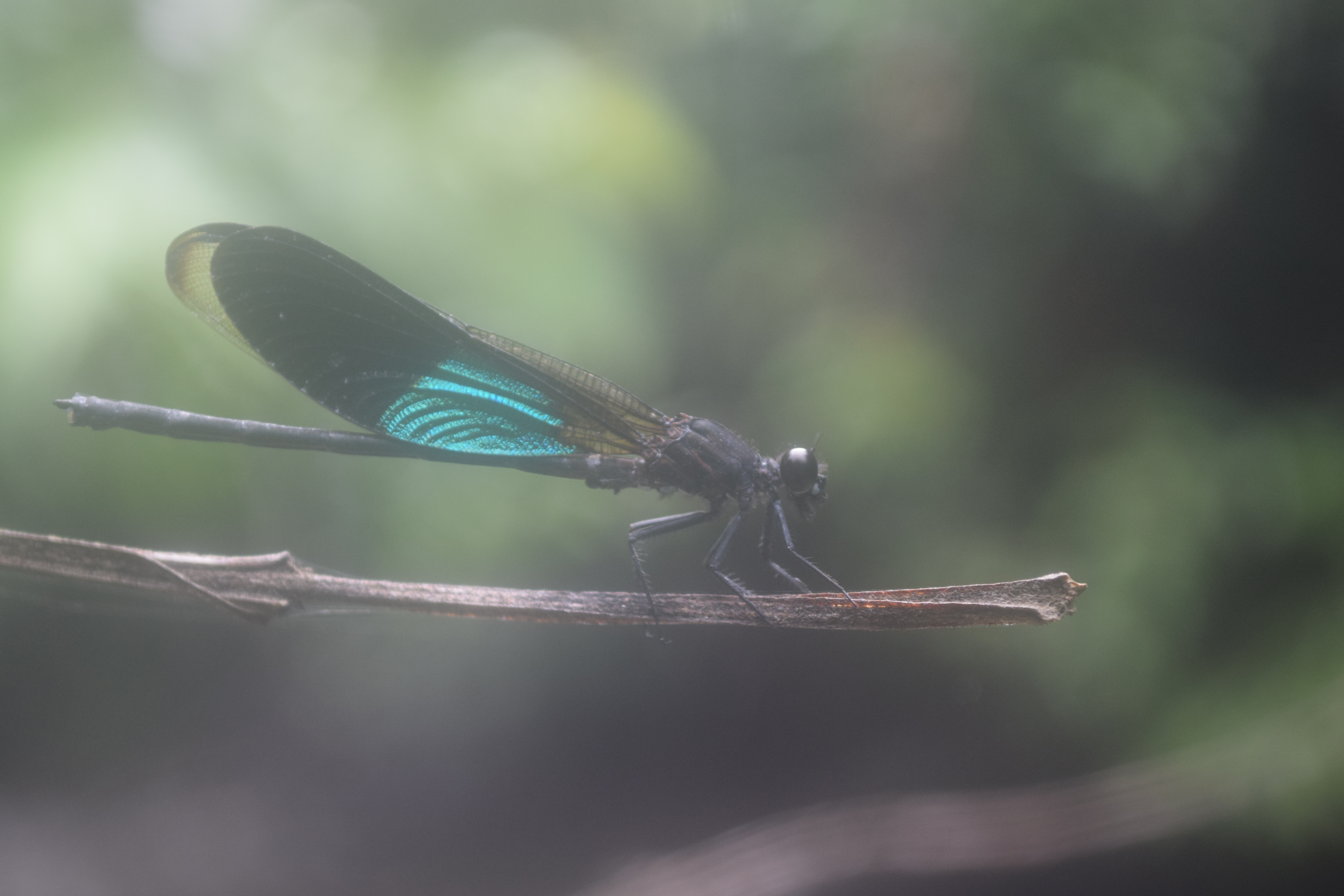

Conservation status
- Least Concern (IUCN 3.1)

Scientific classification
- Kingdom: Animalia
- Phylum: Arthropoda
- Class: Insecta
- Order: Odonata
- Suborder: Zygoptera
- Family: Euphaeidae
- Genus: Euphaea
- Species: E. amphicyana

Binomial name
- Euphaea amphicyana Ris, 1930

= Euphaea amphicyana =

Species of damselfly

Euphaea amphicyana is a species of damselfly that is endemic to the Philippines. This species prefers open spaces in forested clear flowing streams, creeks and rivers. E. amphicyana seems to tolerate moderate human disturbance as long as vegetations and clear running water is maintained. Unfortunately, heavy deforestation and human settlement is occurring within its range and these are a threat to the species.

== Range ==
Euphaea amphicyana is a Philippine endemic species, native to Samar, Leyte, Panaon, Homonhon, Mindanao, Dinagat and Basilan islands.

== Habitat and ecology ==
This species prefers open spaces in forested clear flowing streams, creeks and rivers. Mostly, males are seen perching on nearby vegetations or boulders. On the other hand, females prefer to stay in the tall branches of nearby trees. Larvae are found among debris in the slow moving portion of the waterways and emergence usually in late morning.

Furthermore, E. amphicyana seems to tolerate moderate human disturbance as long as vegetations and clear running water is maintained.
