= Cryptophaea (damselfly) =

Scientific classification
- Kingdom: Animalia
- Phylum: Arthropoda
- Class: Insecta
- Order: Odonata
- Suborder: Zygoptera
- Family: Euphaeidae
- Genus: Cryptophaea; Hämäläinen, 2003

Type species
- Cryptophaea saukra Hämäläinen, 2003

Species
- C. saukra C. vietnamensis C. yunnanensis

Genus of damselflies

Cryptophaea is a small genus of damselflies in the family Euphaeidae.

== Taxonomy ==
The genus was circumscribed by the Finnish entomologist Matti Hämäläinen in 2003 to accommodate several species of damselflies in the family Euphaeidae that were previously misclassified or newly discovered. The genus was created based on specimens from Thailand that were initially misidentified as Schmidtiphaea schmidi Asahina, 1978. The type species of the genus is Cryptophaea saukra, described from specimens collected in Doi Suthep, Chiang Mai province, Thailand.

Cryptophaea is distinct from Bayadera, which has a shorter abdomen, shorter wing petiolation, and only one crossvein in the cubital space. It also differs from Schmidtiphaea, which has fore and hind wings of equal length and the pterostigma of the hind wing broader and placed more apically.

== Description ==
Cryptophaea damselflies are characterised by their small and slender thorax, narrow clear wings, and long abdomen. The abdomen is significantly longer than the wings, with an abdomen-to-wing length ratio ranging from 1.4 to 1.5. The forewings are slightly longer than the hindwings but share a similar shape and width, measuring 5–6 mm at their broadest point.

The wings are attached to the body by long petioles, which extend about two-thirds of the way from the base to the arculus (a crossvein between the radius and cubitus near the base of the wing) in the forewing, and about three-fourths of the way in the hindwing. The cubital space, an area in the wing, contains 3–6 crossveins (small veins crossing the main ones).

One of the primary veins, R2, stays in contact with another vein, R+M, for a short distance after it starts. The nodus, a prominent point in the wing, is located closer to the base than to the middle. Another vein, R3, starts 2–4 cells away from the nodus. The IA (intercalary anterior) vein runs parallel to the wing's edge, separated by only a single row of cells.

The discoidal cell, a long, narrow cell in the wing, is at least four times longer than it is wide, but only about one-third the length of the median space due to the long petiolation. This cell can either be entire or have one crossvein. The pterostigma, a colored, thickened cell on the wing edge, is nearly the same shape in both wings, though it is slightly shorter in the hindwing.

The legs, particularly the fore femora (thighs) and tibiae (shins) in males, are very hairy. Male damselflies of this genus have anal appendages that are twice the length of the tenth abdominal segment (S10), with the superior appendages being strongly bent inwards and downwards, and the inferior appendages being short and sharply pointed.

=== Distinguishing features ===
Cryptophaea is distinguished from other euphaeid genera by several characteristics, including:

- small and slender thorax
- narrow hyaline wings
- very long abdomen (abdomen/wing length ratio 1.4–1.5)
- long petiolation of wings
- multiple crossveins in the cubital space (3–6)
- IA vein running parallel to the wing border

== Species ==
- Cryptophaea saukra Hämäläinen, 2003
- Cryptophaea vietnamensis (van Tol & Rozendaal, 1995)
- Cryptophaea yunnanensis (Davies & Yang, 1996)
