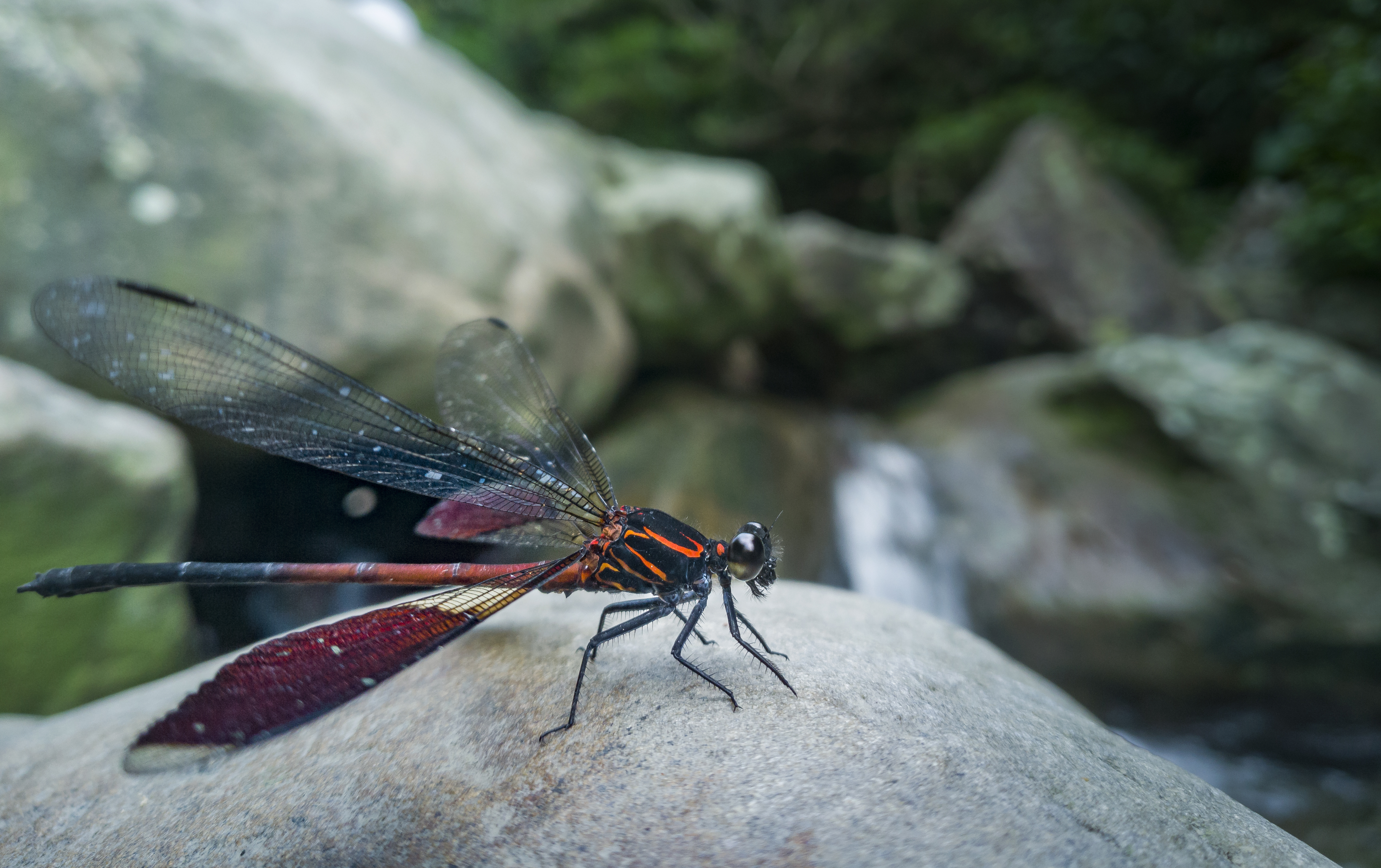

Conservation status
- Least Concern (IUCN 3.1)

Scientific classification
- Kingdom: Animalia
- Phylum: Arthropoda
- Clade: Pancrustacea
- Class: Insecta
- Order: Odonata
- Suborder: Zygoptera
- Family: Euphaeidae
- Genus: Euphaea
- Species: E. formosa

Binomial name
- Euphaea formosa Hagen in Selys, 1869

Synonyms
- Euphaea compar McLachlan, 1860

= Euphaea formosa =

Species of damselfly

Euphaea formosa, the Formosan damselfly, is a species of damselfly in the family Euphaeidae. It is common in Taiwan. There is a single historical record from Xiamen, China as Euphaea compar, though this 19th-century specimen was likely mislabeled; today the species is considered endemic to Taiwan.

The IUCN conservation status of Euphaea formosa is 'least concern', with no immediate threat to the species' survival.

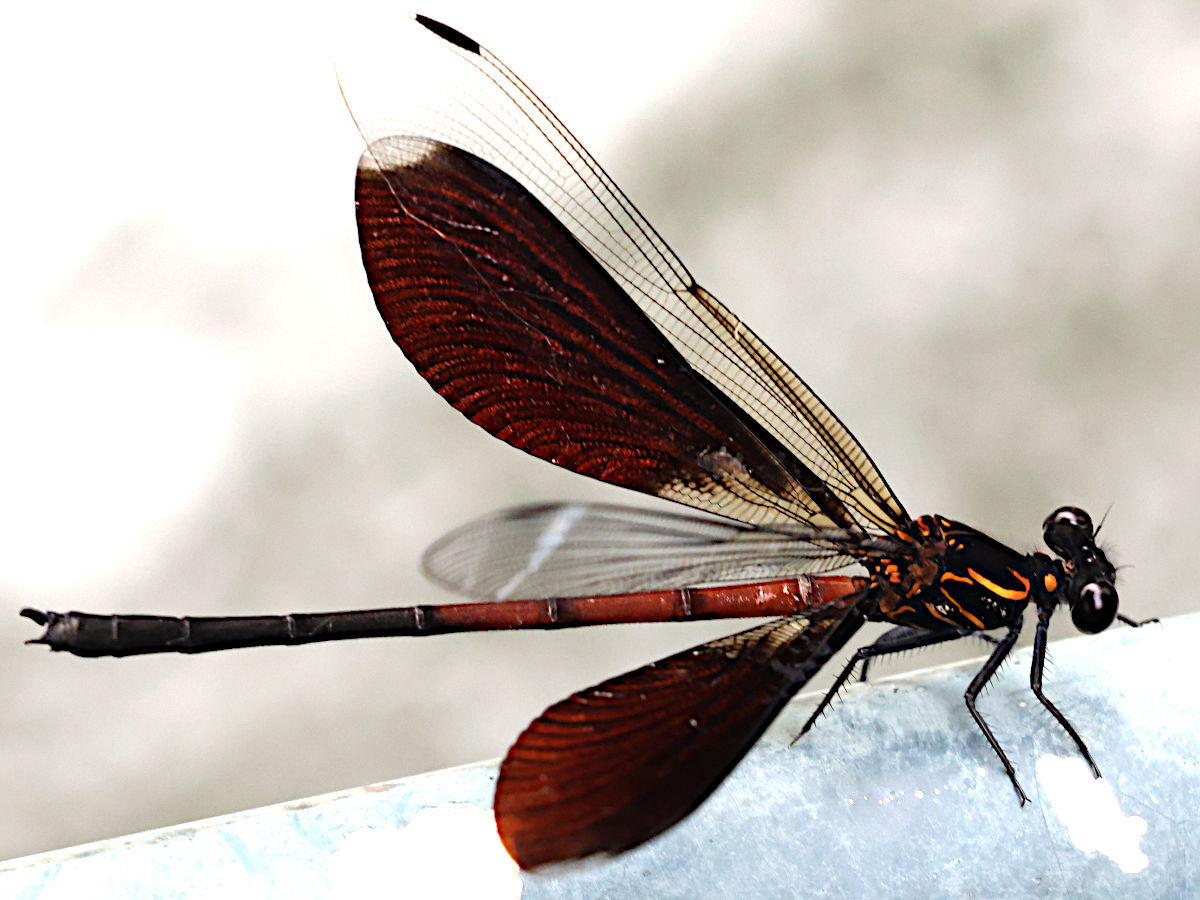
male dorsal view

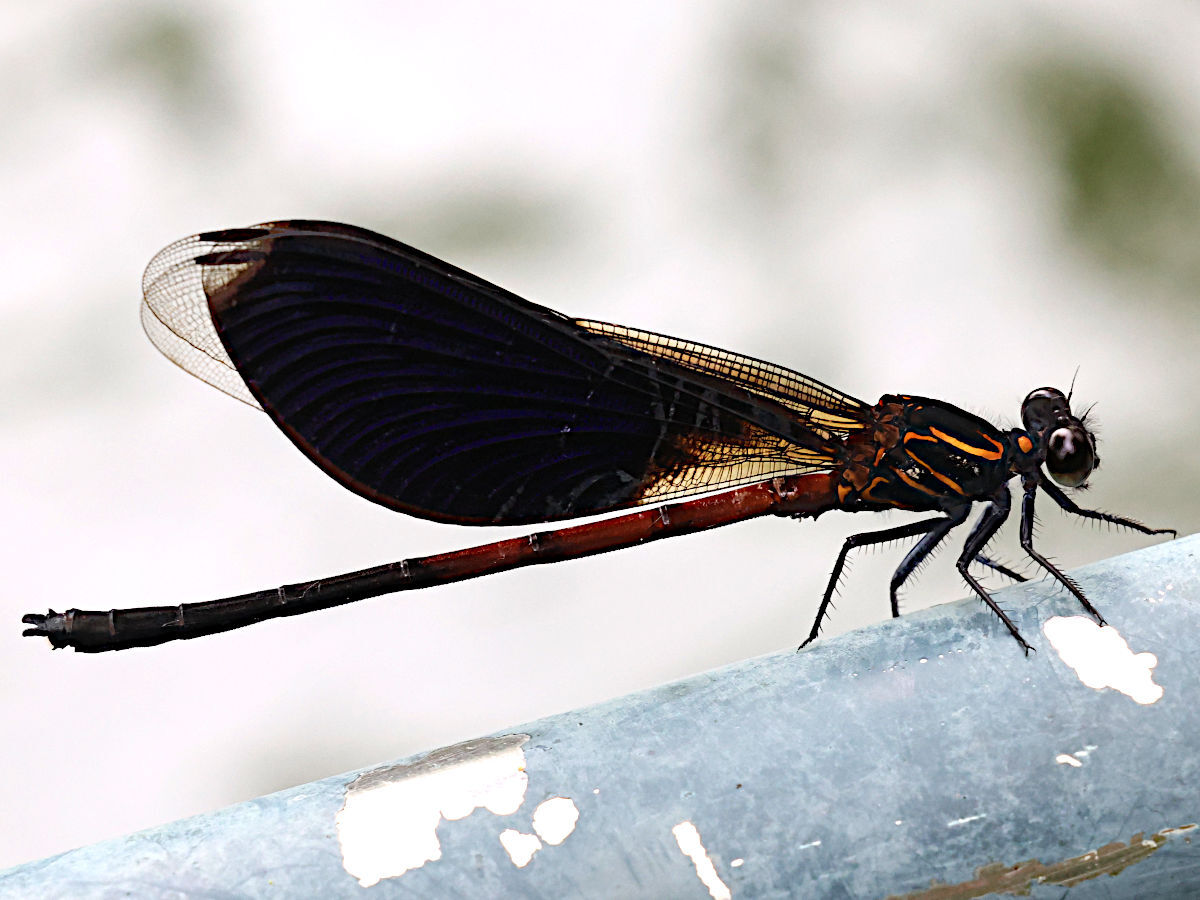
male lateral view
