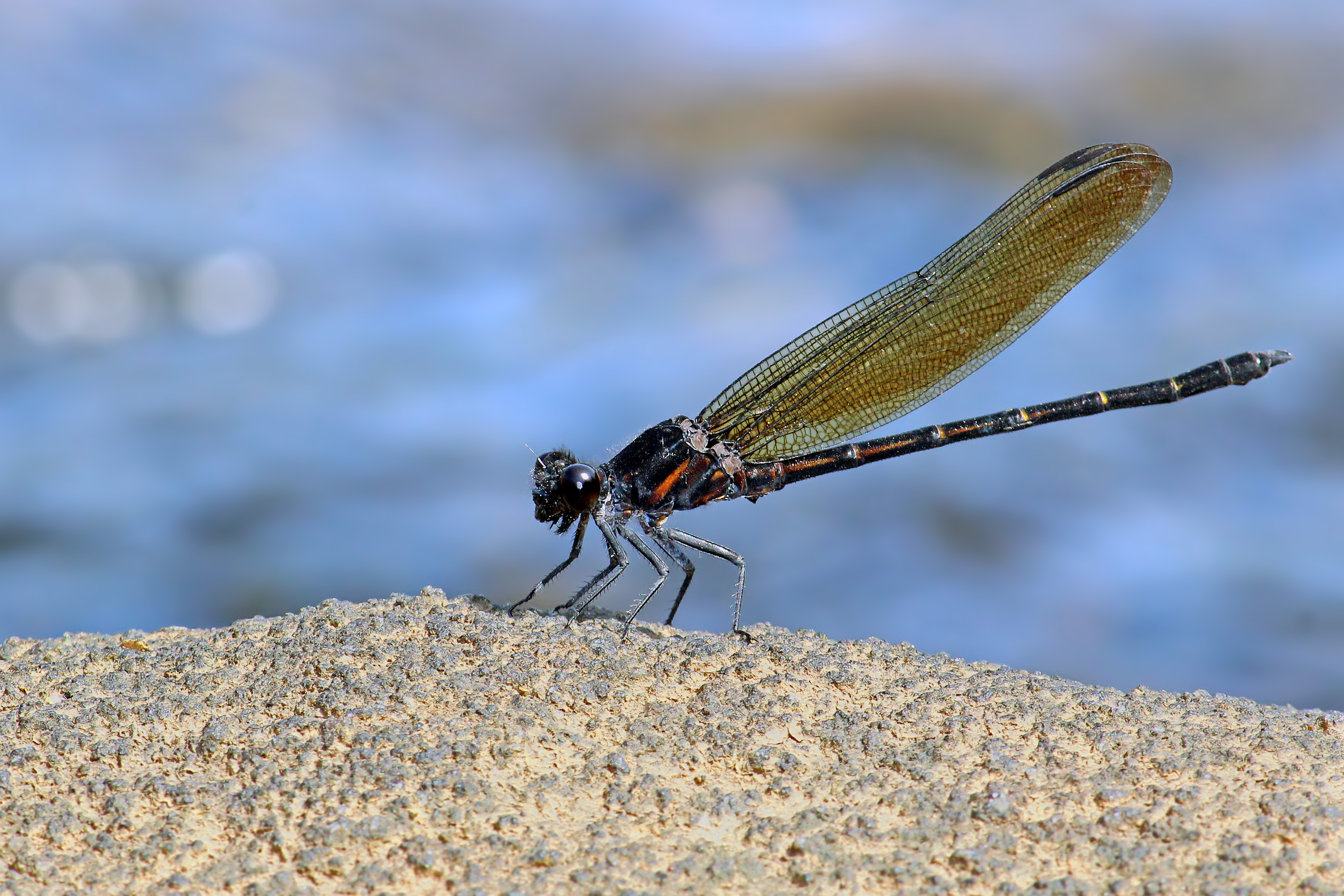
- Male
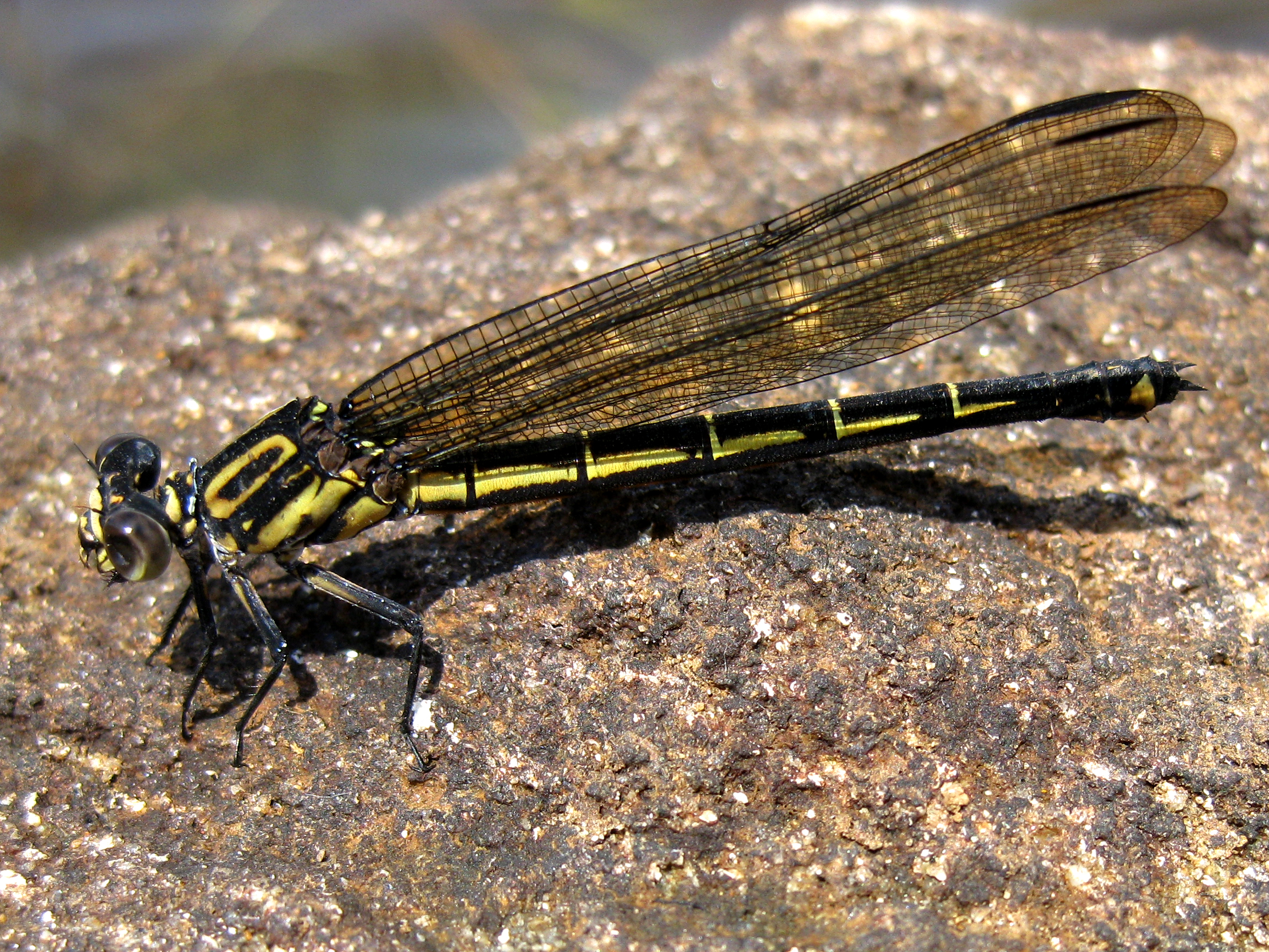
- Female

Conservation status
- Least Concern (IUCN 3.1)

Scientific classification
- Kingdom: Animalia
- Phylum: Arthropoda
- Clade: Pancrustacea
- Class: Insecta
- Order: Odonata
- Suborder: Zygoptera
- Family: Euphaeidae
- Genus: Dysphaea
- Species: D. ethela

Binomial name
- Dysphaea ethela Fraser, 1924

= Dysphaea ethela =

Species of damselfly

Dysphaea ethela, the black torrent dart, is a species of damselfly in the family Euphaeidae. The insect is named after Frederic Charles Fraser's wife, Ethel Grace Fraser (née Varrall) (1881-1960), a constant companion of his collecting trips in India.

It is found in Karnataka and Kerala and Tamil Nadu in Western Ghats. This species is also known from the Eastern Ghats and central India.

== Description ==
It is a medium sized damselfly with black head and brown-capped pale grey eyes. Its thorax is black, marked with narrow antehumeral and humeral greenish-yellow stripes. There are another yellow stripes on the base of lateral sides. These marks will get obscured by pruinescence in old males. Wings are transparent; but evenly infused with brown. Abdomen is black, marked with yellow apical annules up to segment 8. There are yellow lateral stripes up to segment 6. Anal appendages are black.

Female is short and robust; the yellow marks are more broad and vivid. The yellow lateral stripes continued to segment 7. Segment 8 has a narrow and 9 has a broad yellow apical annule, covering dorsal half.

== Habitat ==
It breeds in streams and rivers. Commonly seen perched on reeds or bushes on the river's bank or settled on rocks far inside the stream.

The female laying eggs on a submerged plants in a slow flowing stream

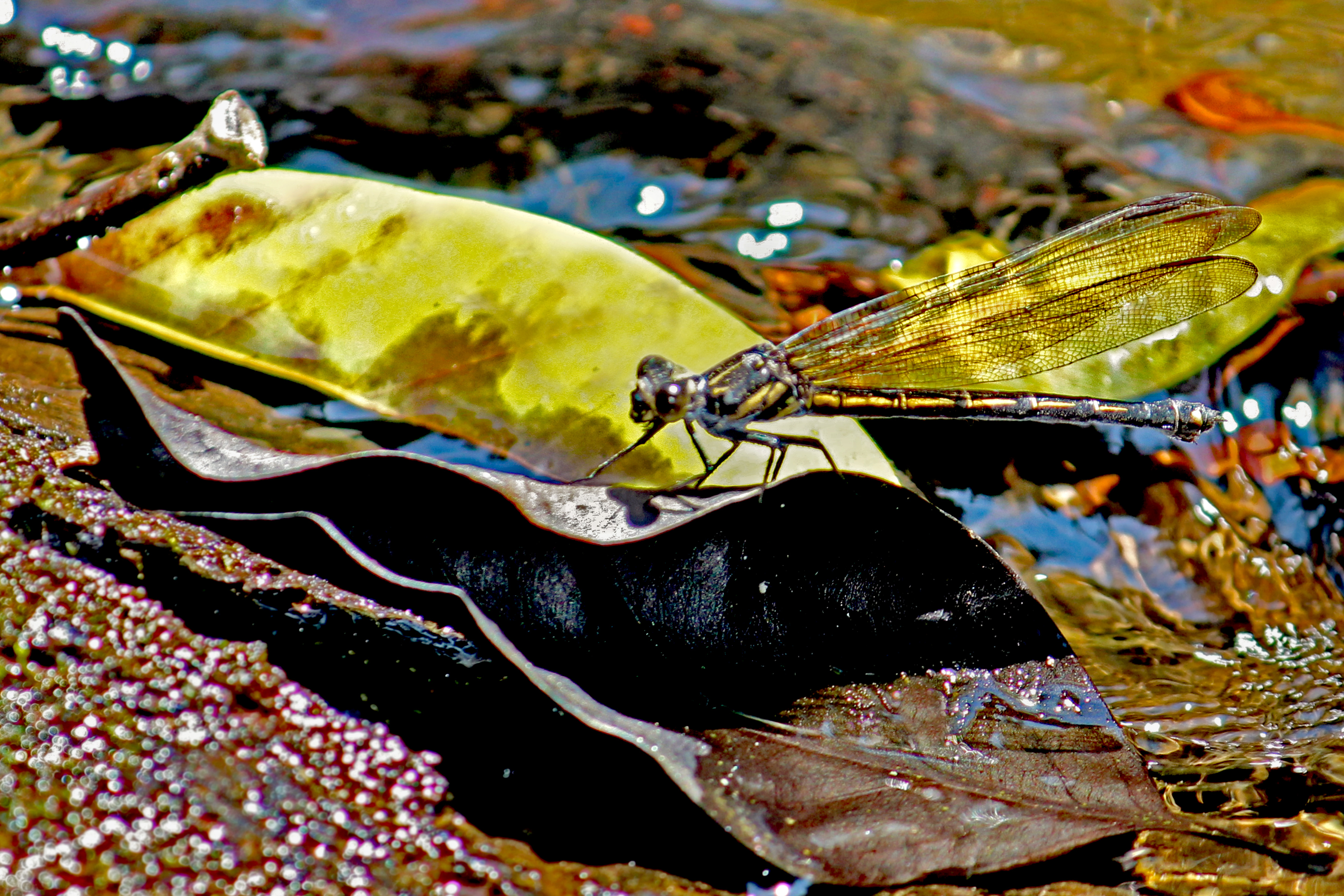

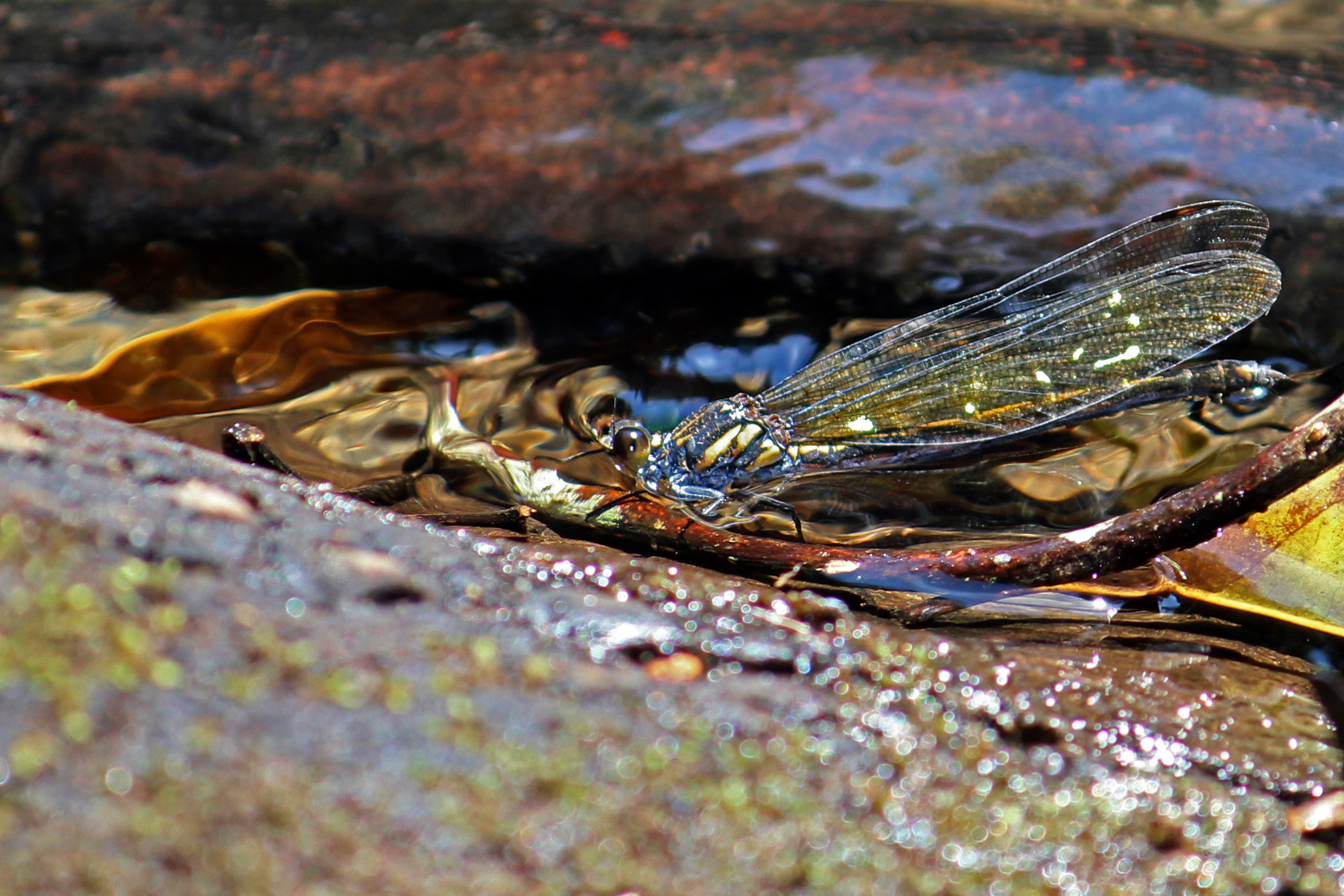

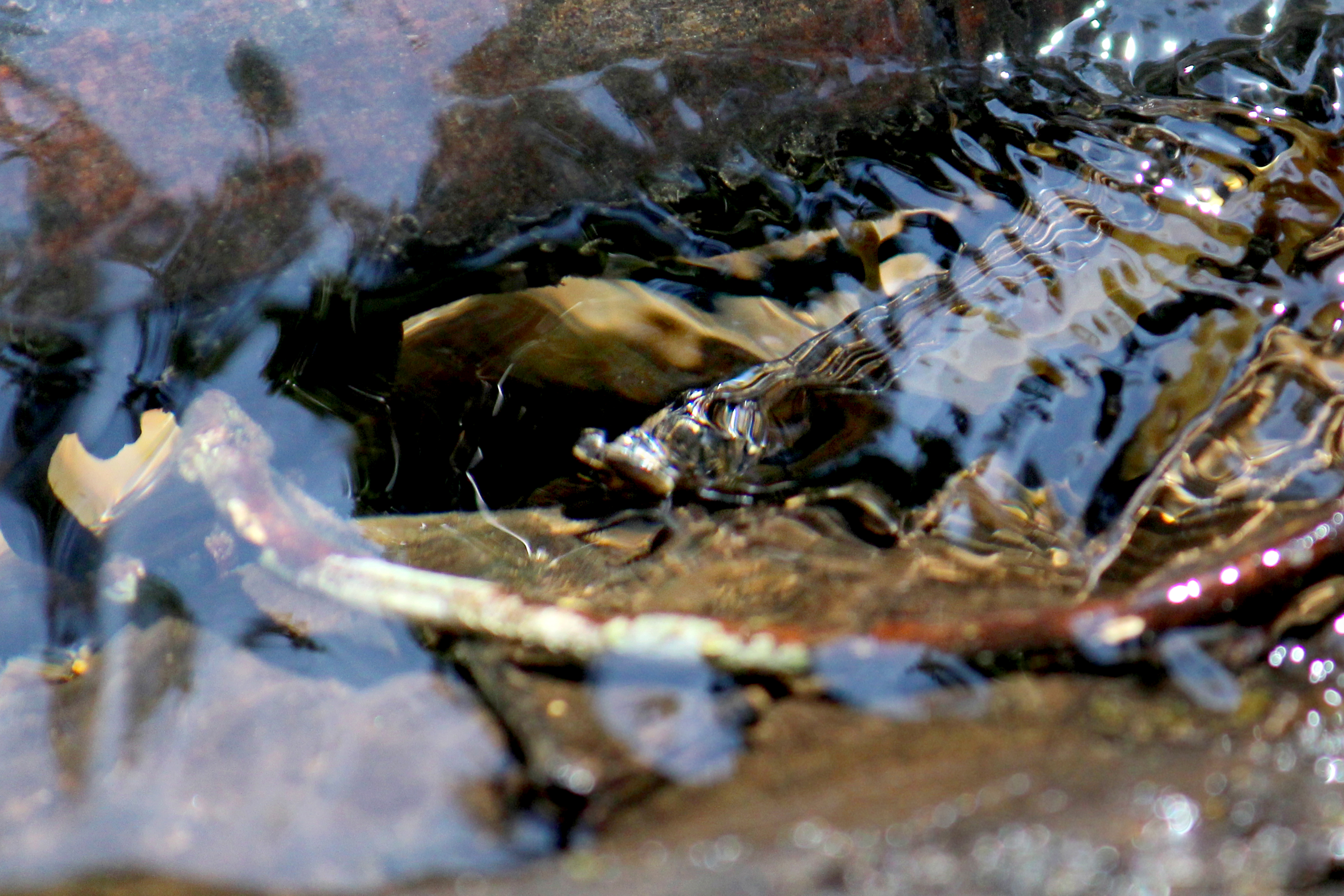

== See also ==
- List of odonates of India
- List of odonata of Kerala
