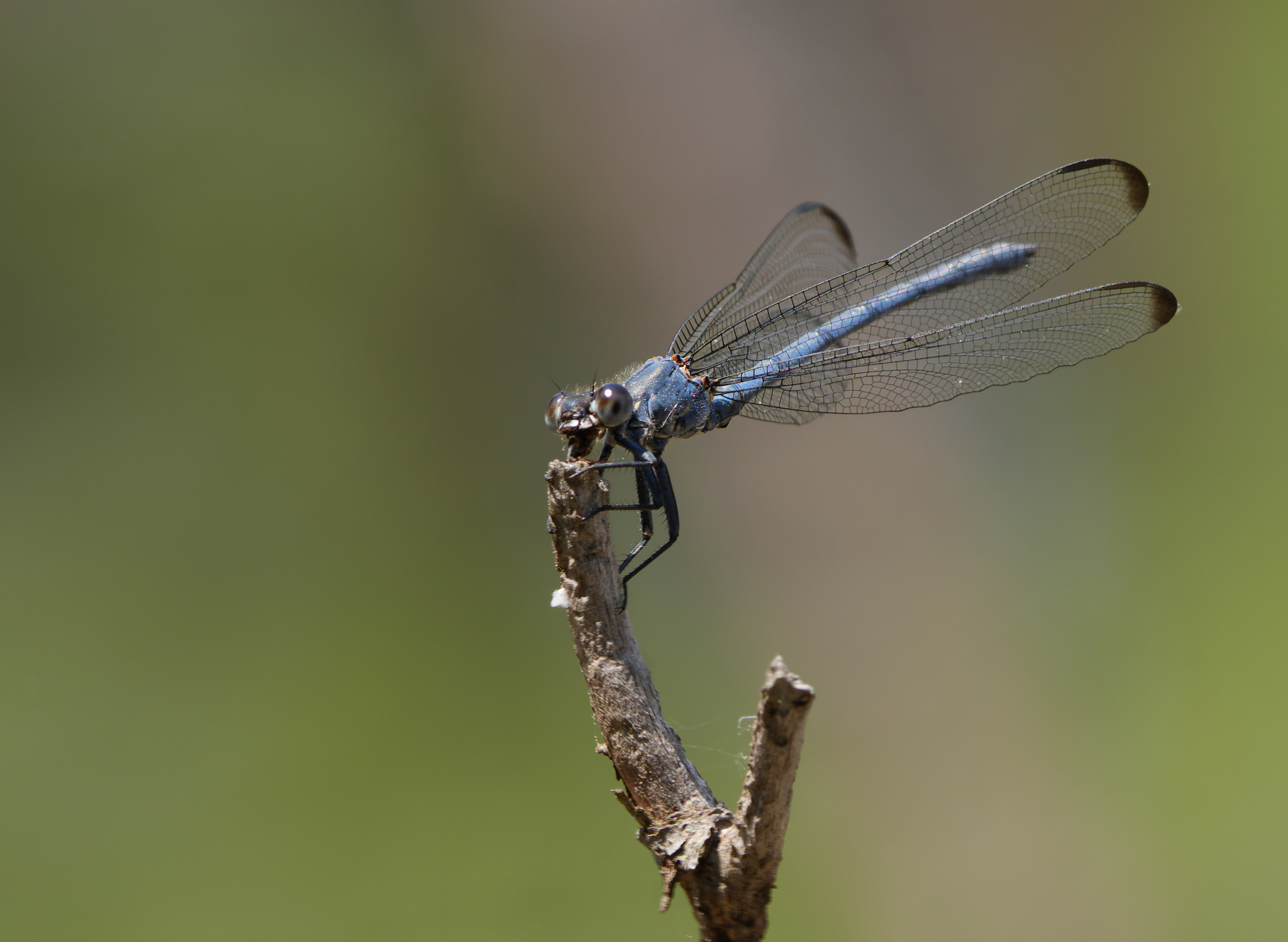
- Male, Greece
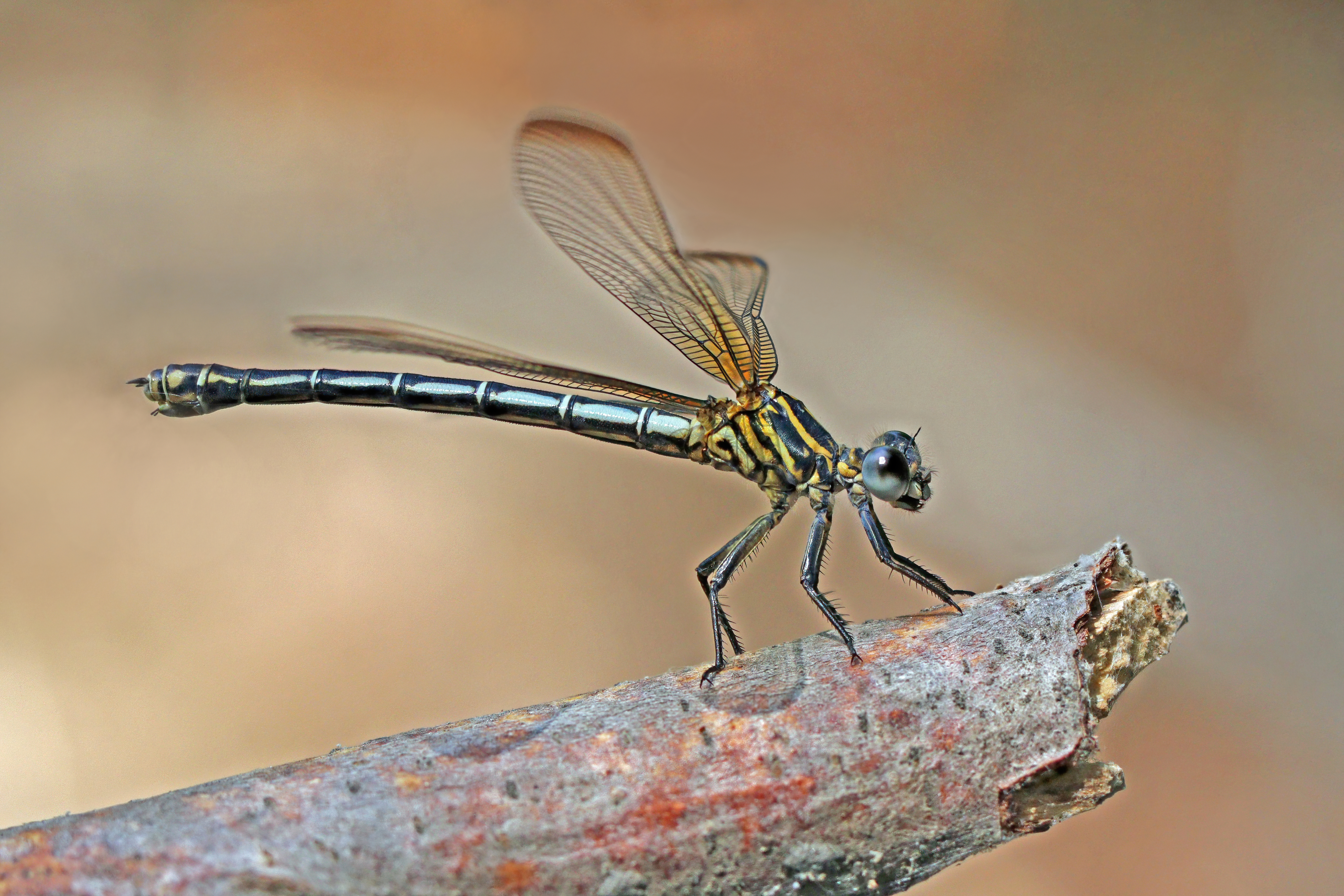
- Female, Cyprus

Scientific classification
- Kingdom: Animalia
- Phylum: Arthropoda
- Clade: Pancrustacea
- Class: Insecta
- Order: Odonata
- Suborder: Zygoptera
- Family: Euphaeidae
- Genus: Epallage
- Species: E. fatime

Binomial name
- Epallage fatime (Charpentier, 1840)

Synonyms
- Agrion fatime Charpentier, 1840, Epallage alma Selys, 1879

= Epallage fatime =

Species of damselfly

Epallage fatime, the Odalisque or Oriental damselfly, is a damselfly (Zygoptera) in the family Euphaeidae (oriental damselflies); it is the sole species in the genus Epallage.

== Features ==
This is a strongly built damselfly, with a length of 40–50 mm. Males are completely pale glaucous blue; only the top of the eyes and forehead are black. Females are yellowish white with dark markings. The abdomen segments have two long dark longitudinal spots on the top, giving the appearance of a narrow light stripe in the middle along the entire length of the abdomen. In specimens where the spots are smaller, this effect is less obvious.

It is the only damselfly in Europe to hold its wings straight out like a dragonfly. The length of the rear wing is 30–34mm. The pterostigma is long (the length of five cells below) and dark blue-grey in males, white or grey in females. In both males and females, the wing tip is usually dark from the pterostigma, but the size of that spot varies. In females, the base of the wings is often dark, but the size of that spot also shows great variation.

== Behaviour ==
Both males and females are frequently seen resting on stones or branches near flowing water. The flight season in Cyprus in from early March to late August.

== Distribution ==
The species occurs in southeastern Europe and southwestern Asia, in southern Bulgaria, Greece, the islands of the Aegean Sea, Cyprus, Turkey and Israel, and further east to Kashmir.
