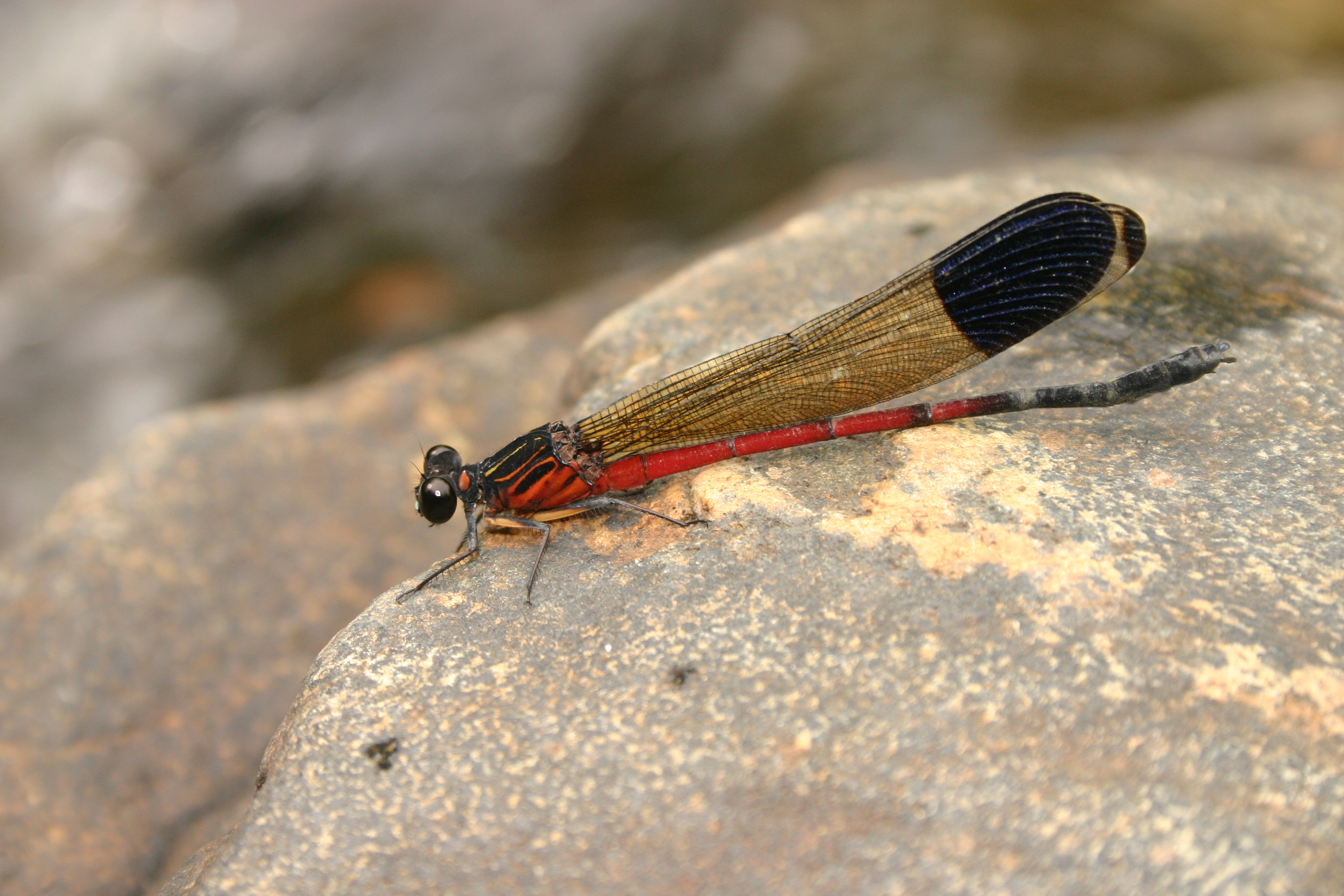
- Male

Conservation status
- Least Concern (IUCN 3.1)

Scientific classification
- Kingdom: Animalia
- Phylum: Arthropoda
- Clade: Pancrustacea
- Class: Insecta
- Order: Odonata
- Suborder: Zygoptera
- Family: Euphaeidae
- Genus: Euphaea
- Species: E. dispar

Binomial name
- Euphaea dispar Rambur, 1842

= Euphaea dispar =

Species of damselfly

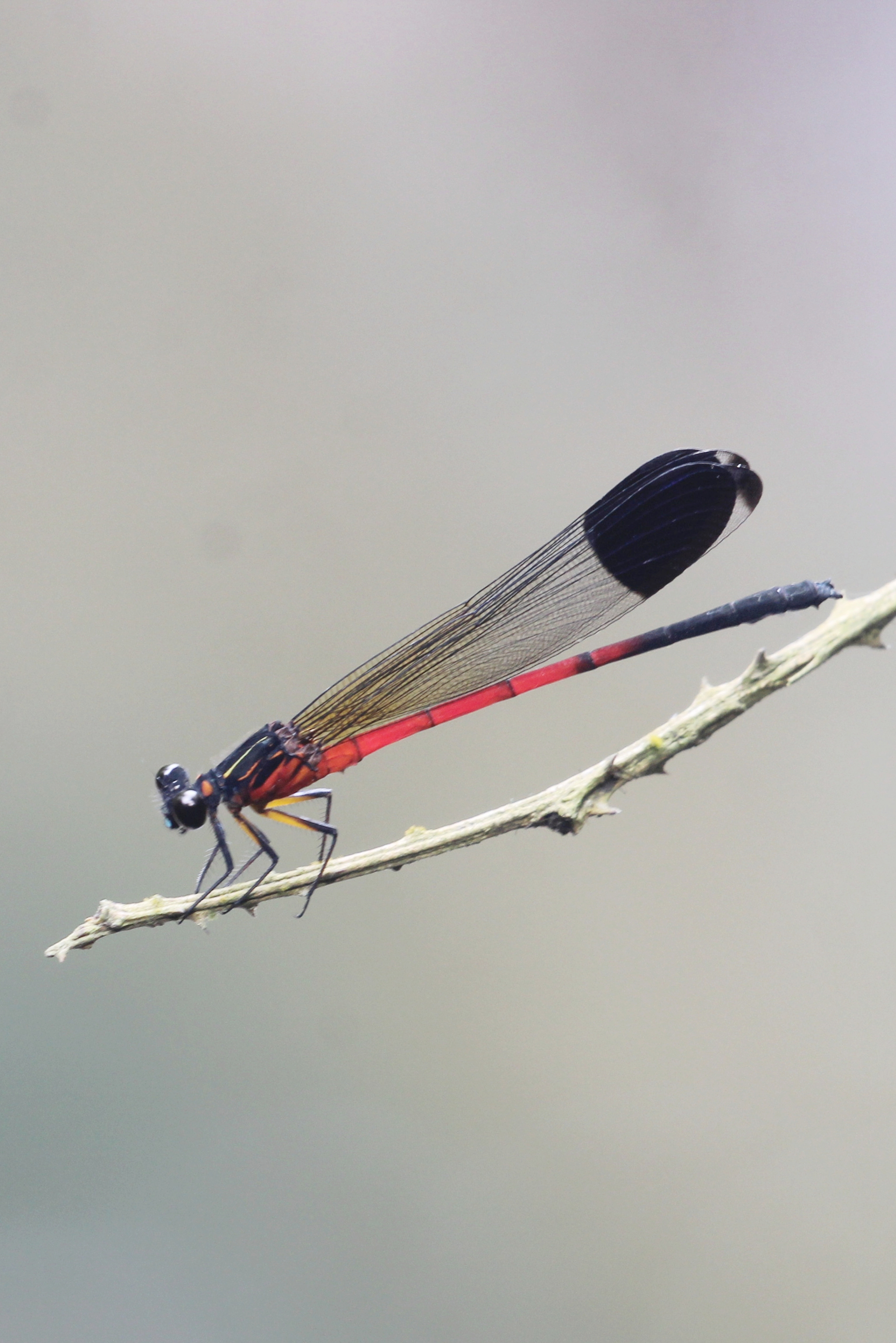
Euphaea dispar, Nilgiri torrent dart photo from wayanad Kerala

Euphaea dispar, Nilgiri torrent dart, is a species of damselfly in the family Euphaeidae.

This species is endemic to the Western Ghats, known to occur only in north of the Palghat Gap; Dakshina Kannada, Udupi and Kodagu to the Nilgiris.

== Description and habitat ==
It is a medium-sized damselfly with black head and brown-capped pale grey eyes. Its thorax is black, marked with bright ochreous-red antehumeral and humeral stripes. Lateral sides of the thorax in the base is red. Its all legs are yellow at base and remaining segments are dark. Wings are narrower than Euphaea cardinalis. Fore-wings are transparent, black on the extreme apices. Hind-wings are transparent; but nearly one third of the wings from the apices are broadly black. Abdomen is bright red up to the segment 6; apical third of segment 6 to the end segment are black. Anal appendages are black. The males of this species can be easily distinguished from other Euphaea species by the small black tips on apices of fore-wings.

Female is short and robust; the ochreous-red of male is replaced with yellow colors. All wings are transparent, infused with black in adults. Abdomen is black with yellow lateral stripes up to segment 6. The yellow lateral stripes continued to segment 7. Segment 8 has a narrow and 9 has a broad yellow apical annule, covering dorsal half.

They breed in streams flowing through evergreen forests. Usually the males are found perched on the twigs hanging above the water or on the rocks.

== See also ==
- List of odonates of India
- List of odonata of Kerala
