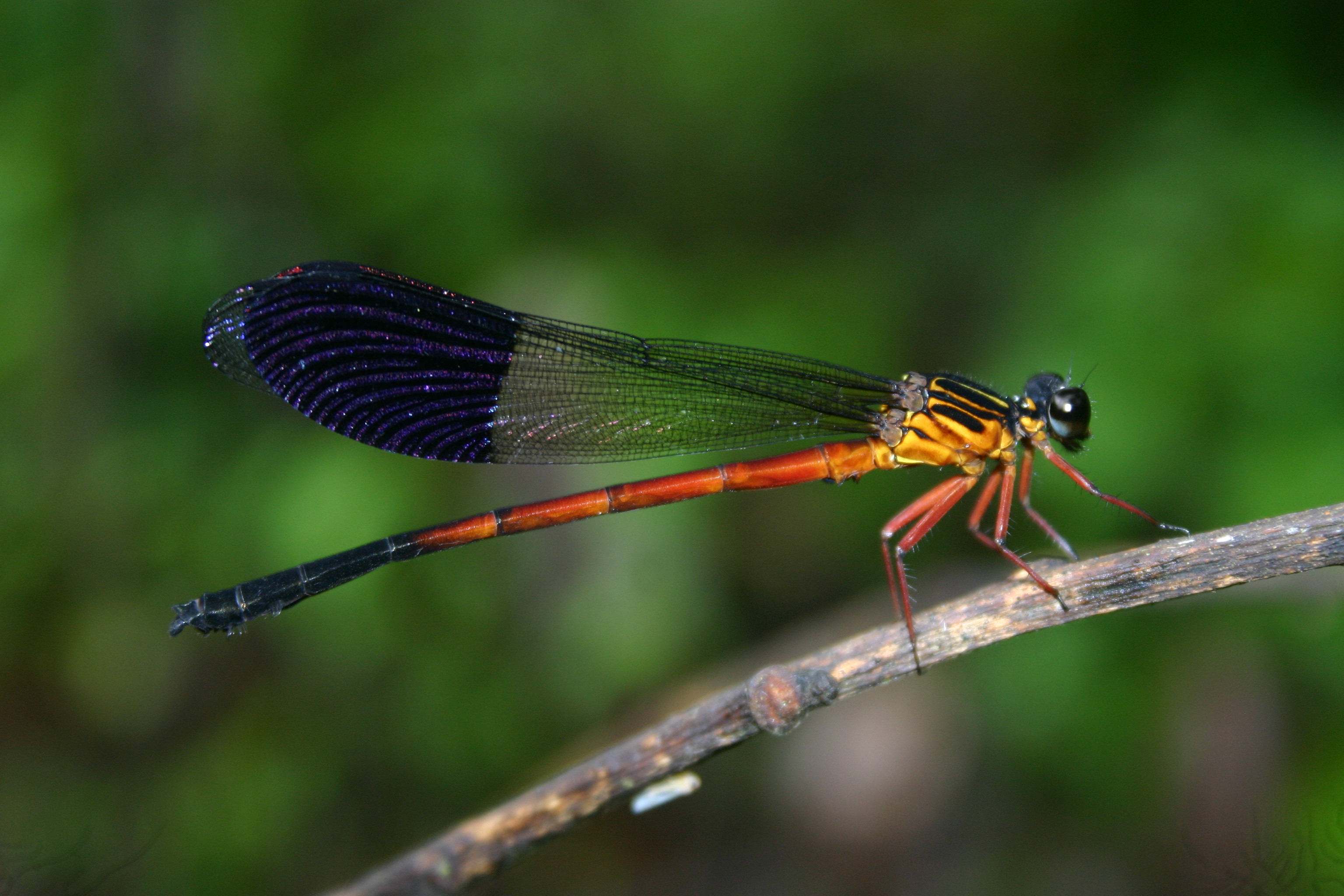
- Male

Conservation status
- Least Concern (IUCN 3.1)

Scientific classification
- Kingdom: Animalia
- Phylum: Arthropoda
- Clade: Pancrustacea
- Class: Insecta
- Order: Odonata
- Suborder: Zygoptera
- Family: Euphaeidae
- Genus: Euphaea
- Species: E. cardinalis

Binomial name
- Euphaea cardinalis (Fraser, 1924)

Synonyms
- Indophaea cardinalis (Fraser, 1924); Pseudophaea cardinalis Fraser, 1924

= Euphaea cardinalis =

Species of damselfly

Euphaea cardinalis, Travancore torrent dart, is a species of damselfly in the family Euphaeidae.

This species was considered endemic to the Western Ghats (Fraser, 1934) and it was known to occur only in south of the Palghat Gap. But it was collected from Assam in 1979 (Mitra 2002).

== Description and habitat ==
It is a medium-sized damselfly with black head and brown-capped pale grey eyes. Its thorax is black, marked with bright ochreous-red antehumeral and humeral stripes. Lateral sides of the thorax in the base is red. Its all legs are red. Wings are broader than Euphaea dispar. Fore-wings are transparent, merely infused with brown on the apices and almost in same length of the abdomen. Hindwings are transparent; but nearly half of the wings from the apices are broadly black. The black area of wings has steely-blue reflections in some lights. Abdomen is bright red up to the segment 6; apical third of segment 6 to the end segment are black. Anal appendages are black.

Female is short and robust; the ochreous-red of male is replaced with yellow colors. All wings are transparent, infused with black in adults. Abdomen is black with yellow lateral stripes up to segment 6. The yellow lateral stripes continued to segment 7. Segment 8 has a narrow and 9 has a broad yellow apical annule, covering dorsal half.

They breed in hill streams and usually find perched on boulders and riparian vegetation of streams.

== See also ==
- List of odonates of India
- List of odonata of Kerala
