= Bayadera =

- Bayadera indica

Scientific classification
- Kingdom: Animalia
- Phylum: Arthropoda
- Clade: Pancrustacea
- Class: Insecta
- Order: Odonata
- Suborder: Zygoptera
- Family: Euphaeidae
- Subfamily: Euphaeinae
- Genus: Bayadera; Selys, 1853

Genus of damselflies

Bayadera is a genus of Asian damselflies in the family Euphaeidae and subfamily Euphaeinae, described by Edmond de Sélys Longchamps in 1853. The species in the genus are distributed in Southeast Asia and the Indian subcontinent (especially the Himalayas).

== Species ==
The World Odonata List lists 17 species:

Species	Author	Distribution
Bayadera bidentata	Needham, 1930	Vietnam (north), China
Bayadera brevicauda	Fraser, 1928	Taiwan
Bayadera continentalis	Asahina, 1973	Vietnam (north), China, Laos
Bayadera fasciata	Sjöstedt, 1932	China (south and southwest), Vietnam (north)
Bayadera forcipata	Needham, 1930	China
Bayadera hatvan	Hämäläinen & Kompier, 2015	Vietnam (north)
Bayadera hyalina	Selys, 1879	Vietnam, China (south), Laos, Thailand, India
Bayadera indica	(Selys, 1853)	India (northeast and north), Nepal, Bhutan, Bangladesh, Myanmar (northern), Southern China (especially Yunnan)
Bayadera ishigakiana	Asahina, 1964	Japan (Ryukyu Islands)
Bayadera kali	Cowley, 1936	India, Nepal, Bhutan
Bayadera kinnara	Hämäläinen, 2013	Myanmar
Bayadera kirbyi	Wilson & Reels, 2001	China (Hong Kong, Hainan, Guangxi, Guangdong)
Bayadera longicauda	Fraser, 1928	India, Nepal, Bhutan, Bangladesh
Bayadera melanopteryx	Ris, 1912	Vietnam (north), China
Bayadera nephelopennis	Davies & Yang, 1996	Vietnam (north), China (Sichuan)
Bayadera serrata	Davies & Yang, 1996	Vietnam (north), China (Yunnan, Sichuan), Laos, Thailand
Bayadera strigata	Davies & Yang, 1996	Vietnam (north), China (Yunnan)
