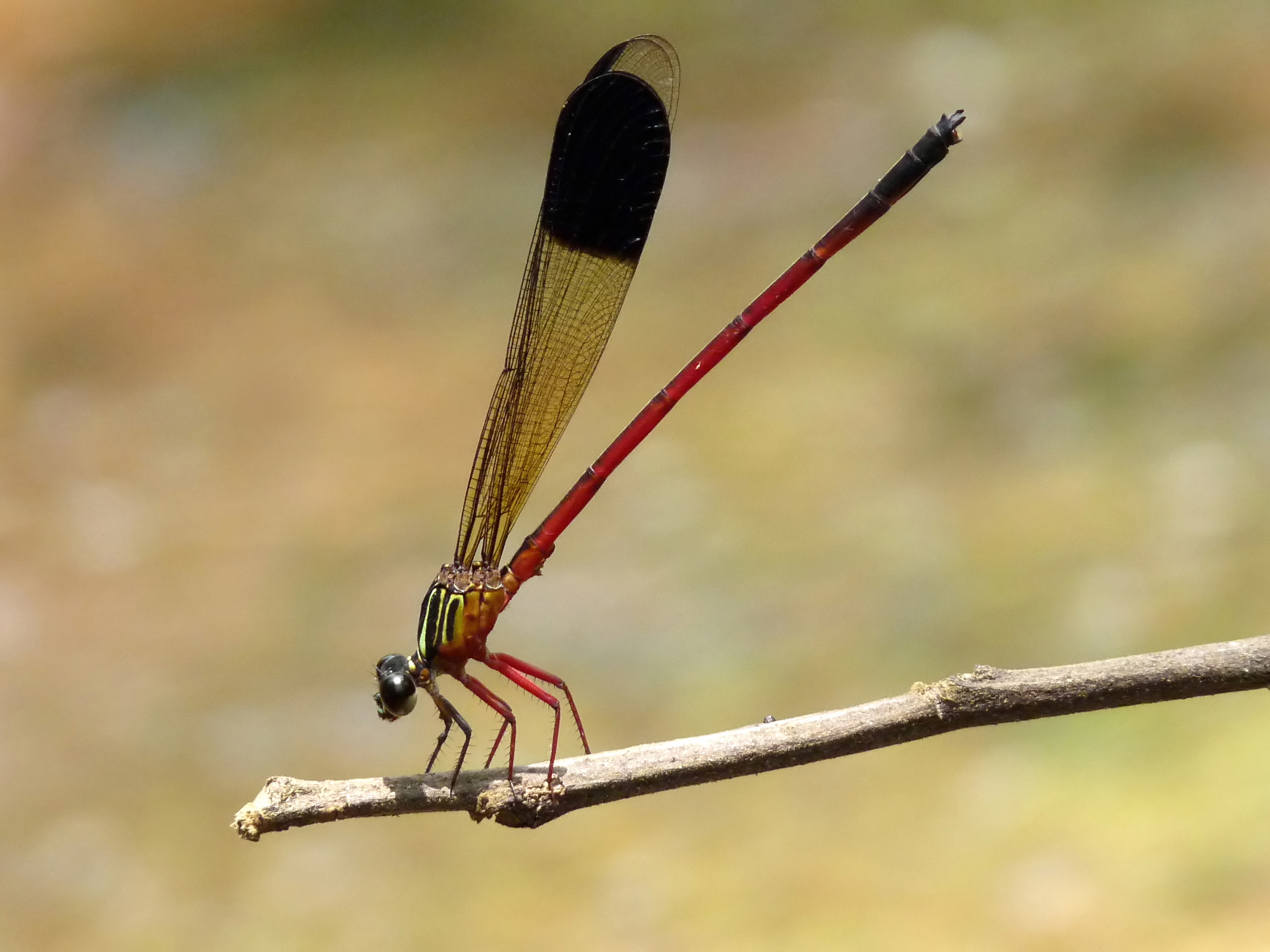
- Euphaea fraseri, male
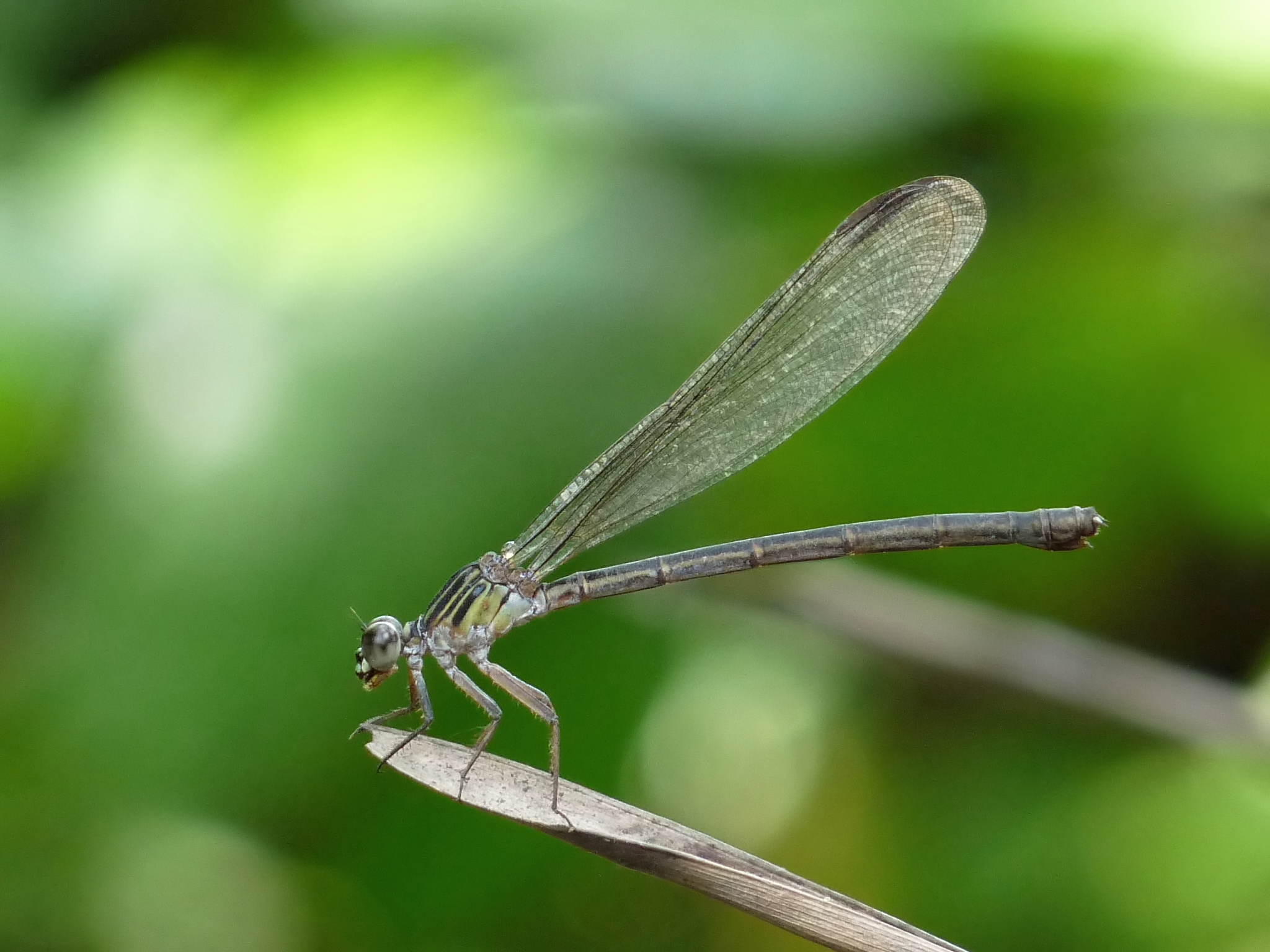
- Euphaea fraseri, female

Scientific classification
- Kingdom: Animalia
- Phylum: Arthropoda
- Clade: Pancrustacea
- Class: Insecta
- Order: Odonata
- Suborder: Zygoptera
- Superfamily: Euphaeoidea
- Family: Euphaeidae; Selys, 1853

Subfamilies
- Eodichromatinae; Euphaeinae
- Distribution of Euphaeidae

Synonyms
- Epallagininae Needham, 1903; Epallagidae Handlirsch, 1906; Zacallitidae Cockerell, 1928

= Euphaeidae =

Family of damselflies

Euphaeidae, commonly known as gossamerwings, is a family of damselflies in the superfamily Euphaeoidea, found from southeasternmost Europe across southwestern, tropical and eastern Asia to Indonesia. The family contains about 80 living species in nine genera, most of which inhabit forest streams and rivers.

Euphaeids are among the largest damselflies and are often strikingly coloured, with metallic bodies and patterned wings. Although they resemble the better-known broad-winged damselflies of the family Calopterygidae, they can be distinguished by their densely veined wings and by the unique larvae, which possess additional pairs of abdominal gills.

== Description ==
Euphaeids are medium-sized to large damselflies with robust bodies and broad wings. Many species have metallic green, blue or bronze colour, while in some, notably Epallage fatime, the males are glaucous pale blue. Males of some species possess darkened or patterned wings used in display behaviour.

The wings are densely veined and usually contain numerous antenodal cross-veins, a feature noted by Sélys when he established the group in 1853. Adults typically inhabit shaded streams and rivers in forested habitats.

The larvae are distinctive among damselflies in possessing seven pairs of lateral abdominal gills in addition to the three terminal caudal gills. This character has been regarded as one of the principal features defining the family.

== Taxonomic history ==
Sélys established the "Legion Euphaea" in 1853 for a group of large Asian damselflies centred on the genus Euphaea. The group was subsequently treated under several family-group names; Bianchi used the name Euphaeinae in 1905. The family-group name is now attributed to Sélys, 1853.

The family has generally been regarded as a distinct lineage of damselflies, although some authors argued that the older name Epallagidae should take precedence. Because Euphaeidae has remained overwhelmingly dominant in the scientific literature, modern classifications continue to use that name.

Morphological and molecular studies have consistently supported Euphaeidae as a natural group. Recent classifications place it with Lestoideidae and Pseudolestidae in the superfamily Euphaeoidea.

== Subfamilies, tribes, and genera ==
The family contains nine living genera and a number of fossil genera known from Eocene and Oligocene deposits.

- †Eodichromatinae
  - †Eodichromatini
    - †Ejerslevia Zessin, 2011 (Fur Formation, Ypresian, Denmark)
    - †Eodichroma Cockerell, 1923 (Wellborn Formation, Priabonian, Texas)
    - †Labandeiraia Petrulevičius et al., 2007 (Fur Formation & Green River Formation, Ypresian, Denmark & Colorado)
    - †Parazacallites Nel, 1988 (Aix-en-Provence Formation, Chattian, France)
    - †Republica Archibald & Cannings, 2021 (Klondike Mountain Formation, Ypresian, Washington)
    - †Solveigia wittecki Zessin, 2011 (Fur Formation, Ypresian, Denmark)
    - †Wolfgangeuphaea Ferwer & Nel, 2020 (Baltic Amber, Priabonian, Europe)
  - †Litheuphaeini
    - †Litheuphaea Fraser, 1955 (Goshen flora, Green River Formation & Baltic Amber, Ypresian - Repuelian?, Europe, Colorado, & Oregon)
  - incertae sedis
    - †Eodysphaea Bechly et al., 2020 (Green River Formation, Ypresian, Colorado)
- Euphaeinae
  - Anisopleura Selys, 1853
  - Bayadera Selys, 1853
  - Cryptophaea Hämäläinen, 2003
  - Cyclophaea Ris, 1930
  - Dysphaea Selys, 1853
  - †Elektroeuphaea Nel et al., 2013 (Baltic Amber, Priabonian, Europe)
  - Epallage Charpentier, 1840
  - Euphaea Selys, 1840
  - Heterophaea Cowley, 1934
  - Schmidtiphaea Asahina, 1978
- Incertae sedis
  - †Epallagites Cockerell (Green River Formation, Ypresian, Colorado)

== Etymology ==
The family name Euphaeidae is derived from the type genus Euphaea, with the standard zoological suffix -idae used for animal families.

The genus name Euphaea is presumably derived from the Greek εὐφαιής (euphaēs), meaning "splendid", "beautiful" or "radiant", likely referring to the striking appearance of these damselflies and the metallic colours displayed by many species.
