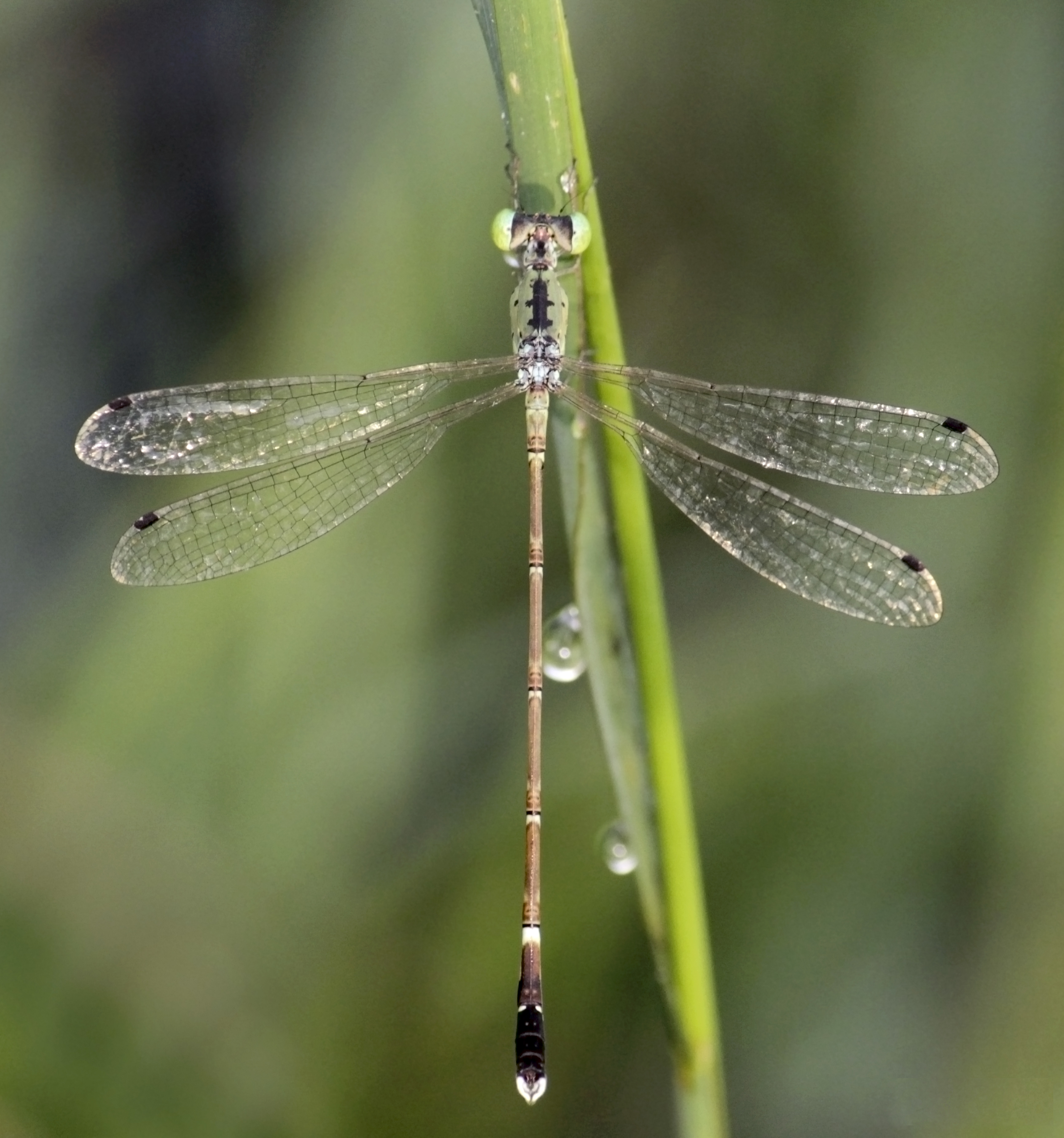
- Male
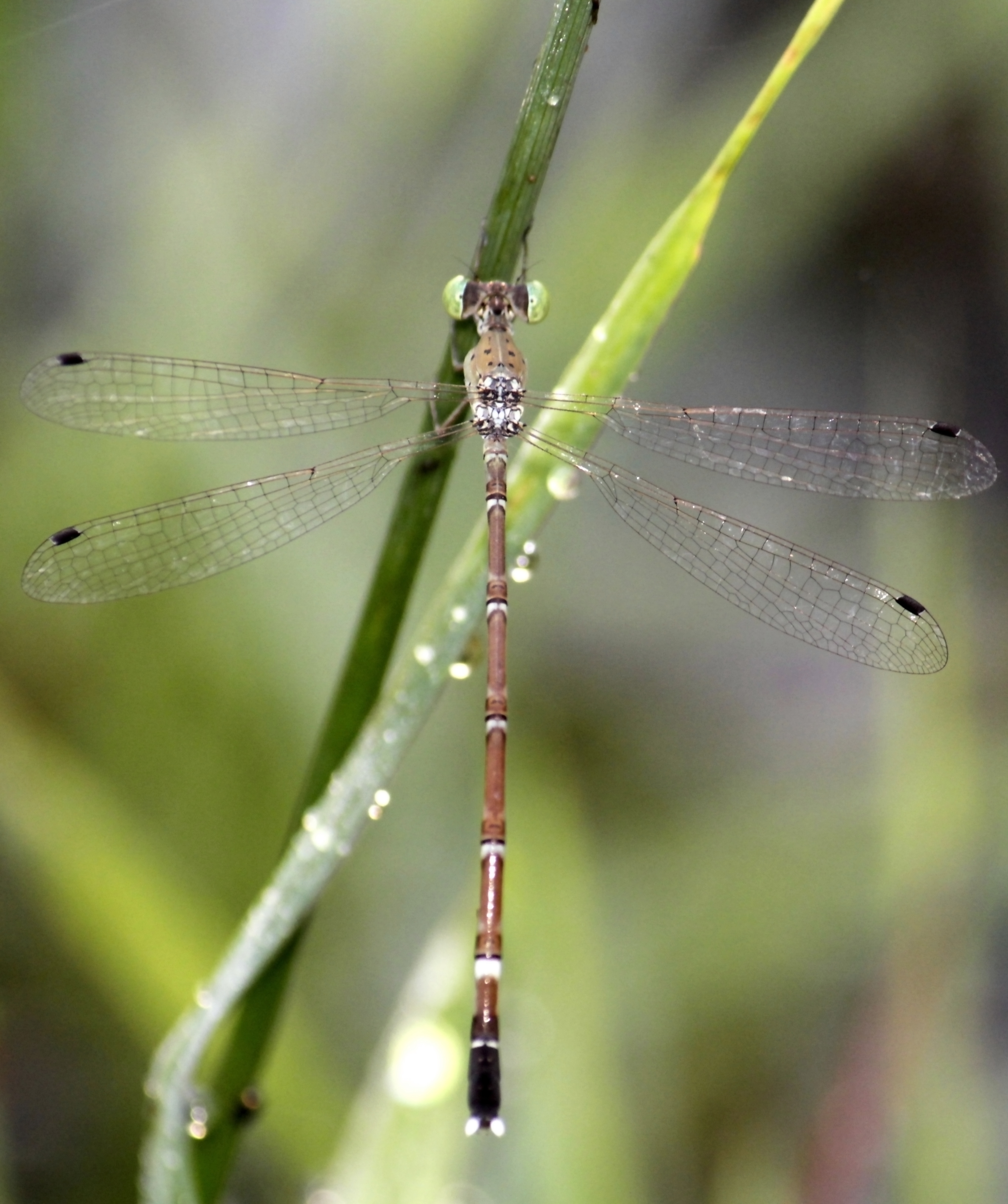
- Female

Scientific classification
- Kingdom: Animalia
- Phylum: Arthropoda
- Clade: Pancrustacea
- Class: Insecta
- Order: Odonata
- Suborder: Zygoptera
- Family: Lestidae
- Genus: Platylestes
- Species: P. kirani

Binomial name
- Platylestes kirani Emiliyamma, Palot & Charesh, 2020

= Platylestes kirani =

Species of damselfly

Platylestes kirani is a damselfly species in the family Lestidae. This species is known from coastal wetlands in Kerala, South India. The species is named after the late C.G. Kiran, in recognition of his outstanding contribution to the odonate studies in Kerala.

== Description and habitat ==
It is a small dull colored damselfly with apple green eyes. Its prothorax and thorax are in yellowish green color, paler at the sides. There is a broad black stripe on the dorsum of the thorax, straight on the inner border, outwardly expanded at the upper, middle and at the lower end, as in Lestes praemorsus. There are a large number of black spots on the thorax. Its wings are transparent with short and broad pterostigma having white or creamy yellow inner and outer ends. Its abdomen is in olivaceous to warm reddish brown in color with black apical rings on each segments. Anal appendages are whitish with the superiors black at base, curling in at apices to meet each other. Inferior appendages are about half the length of superiors and ends at the middle of sharp spine of inner membrane like expansion of superiors, slender throughout its length, convergent and meet at extreme apices.

Female closely resembles the male in most respects, differing mainly in sexual characters, as in Platylestes platystylus.

This species can be easily distinguished from P. platystylus which also common in Kerala by its broad black band on synthorax.

This species is mainly found foraging inside the shoreline vegetation and occasionally resting on the stems or on the leaf blades of grasses and sedges.

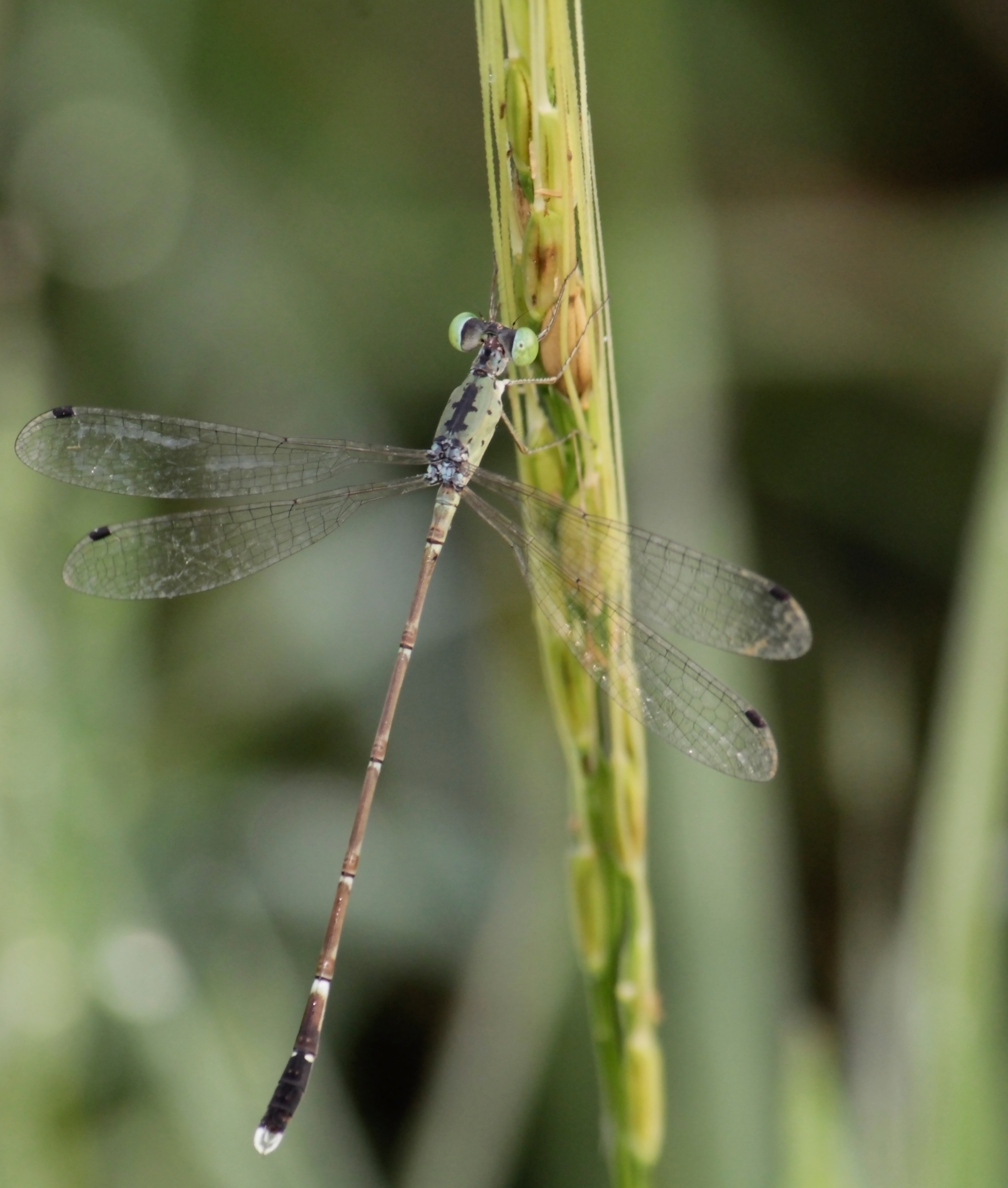
Male

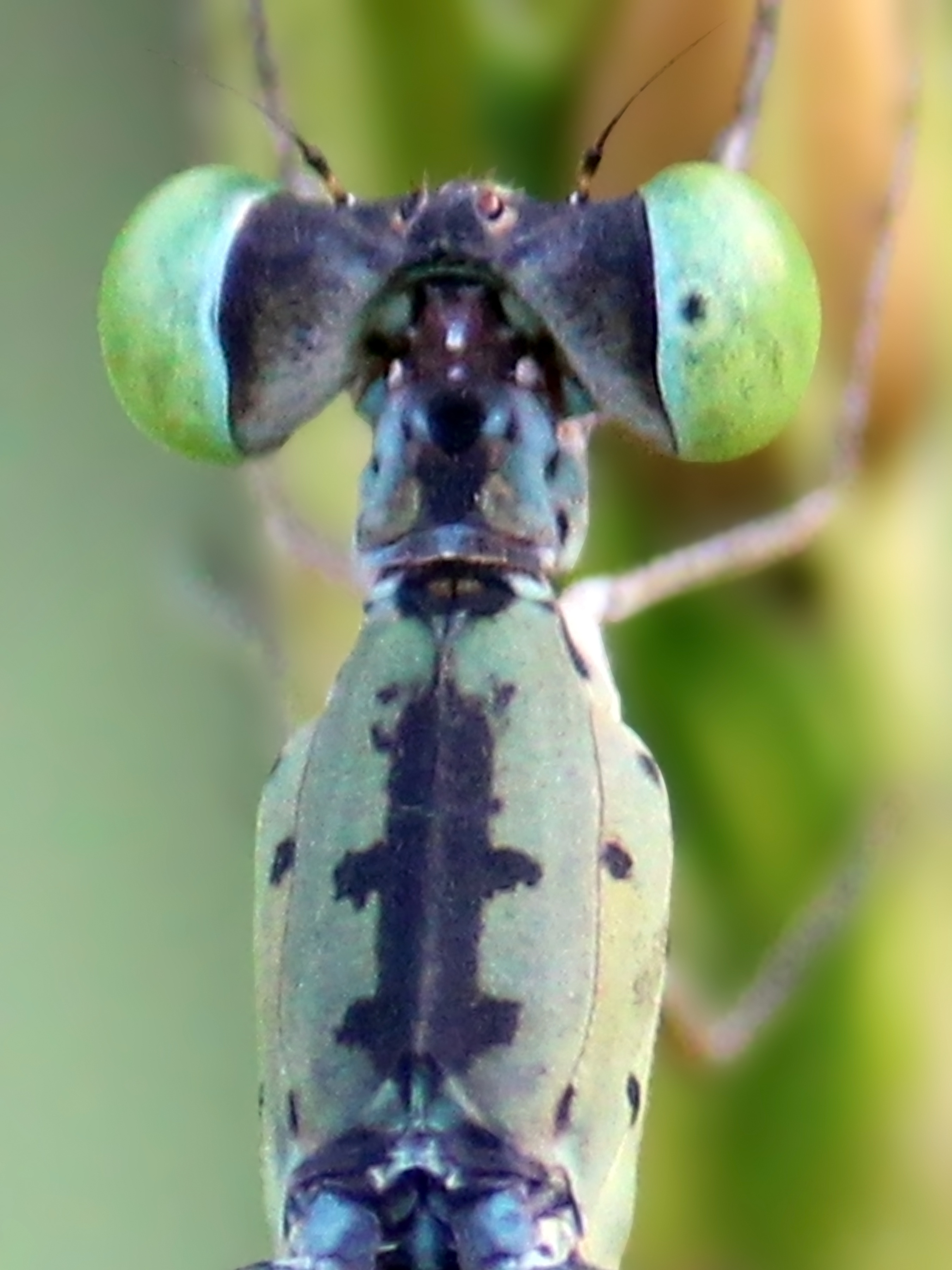
Dorsal view of male, showing black marks on thorax

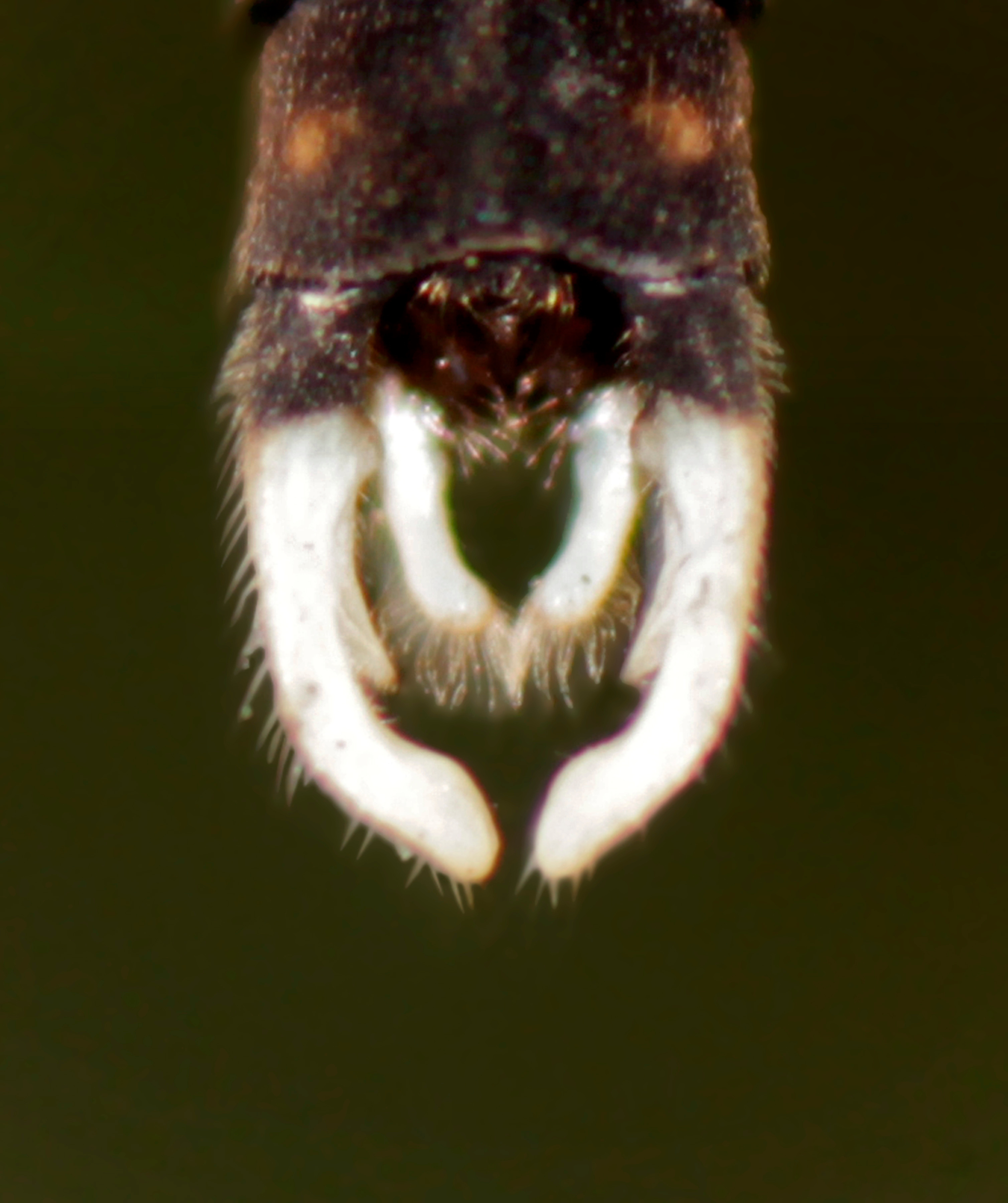
Terminal abdominal appendages of male

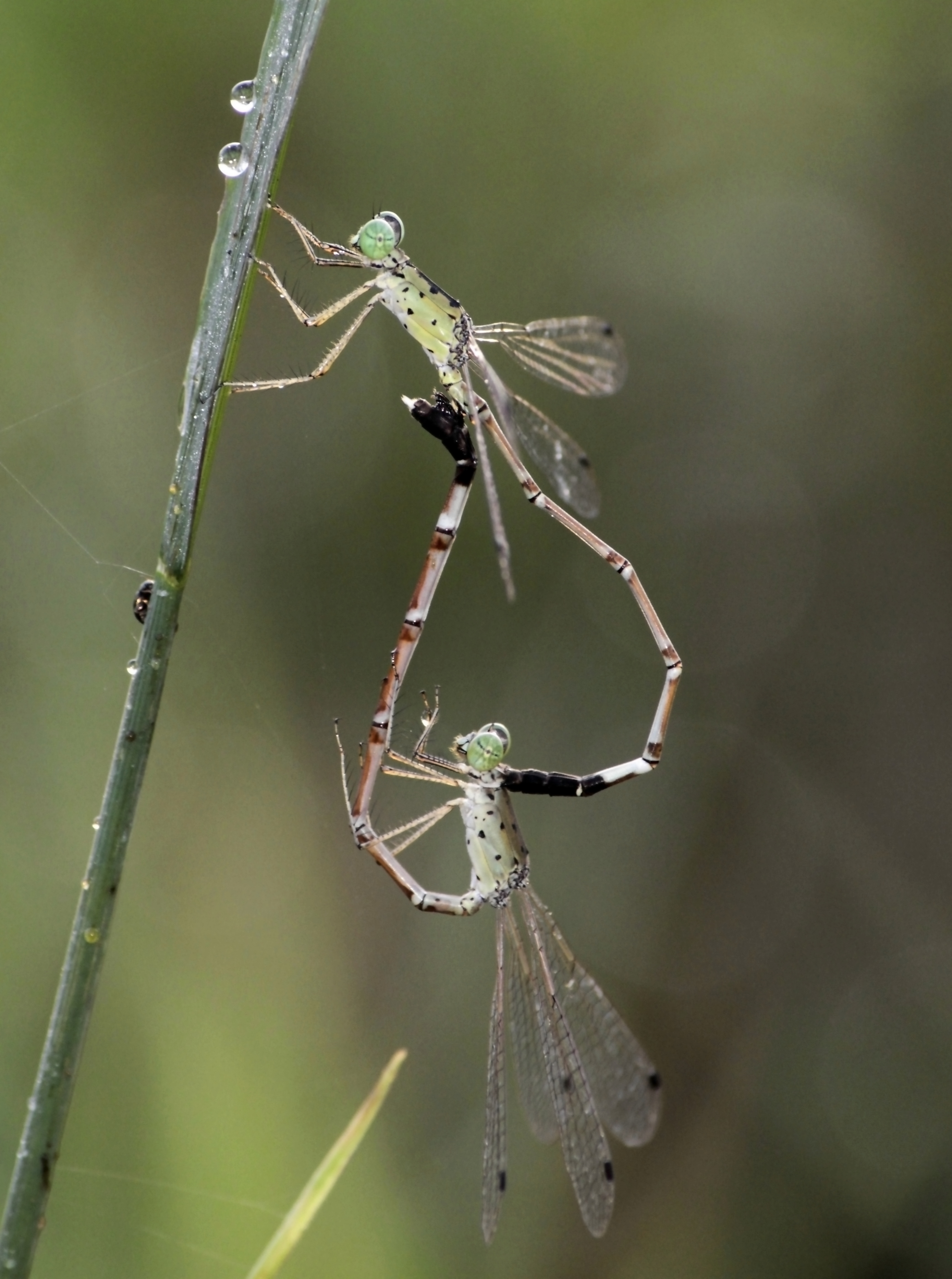
Mating pair

== See also ==
- List of odonates of India
- List of odonata of Kerala
