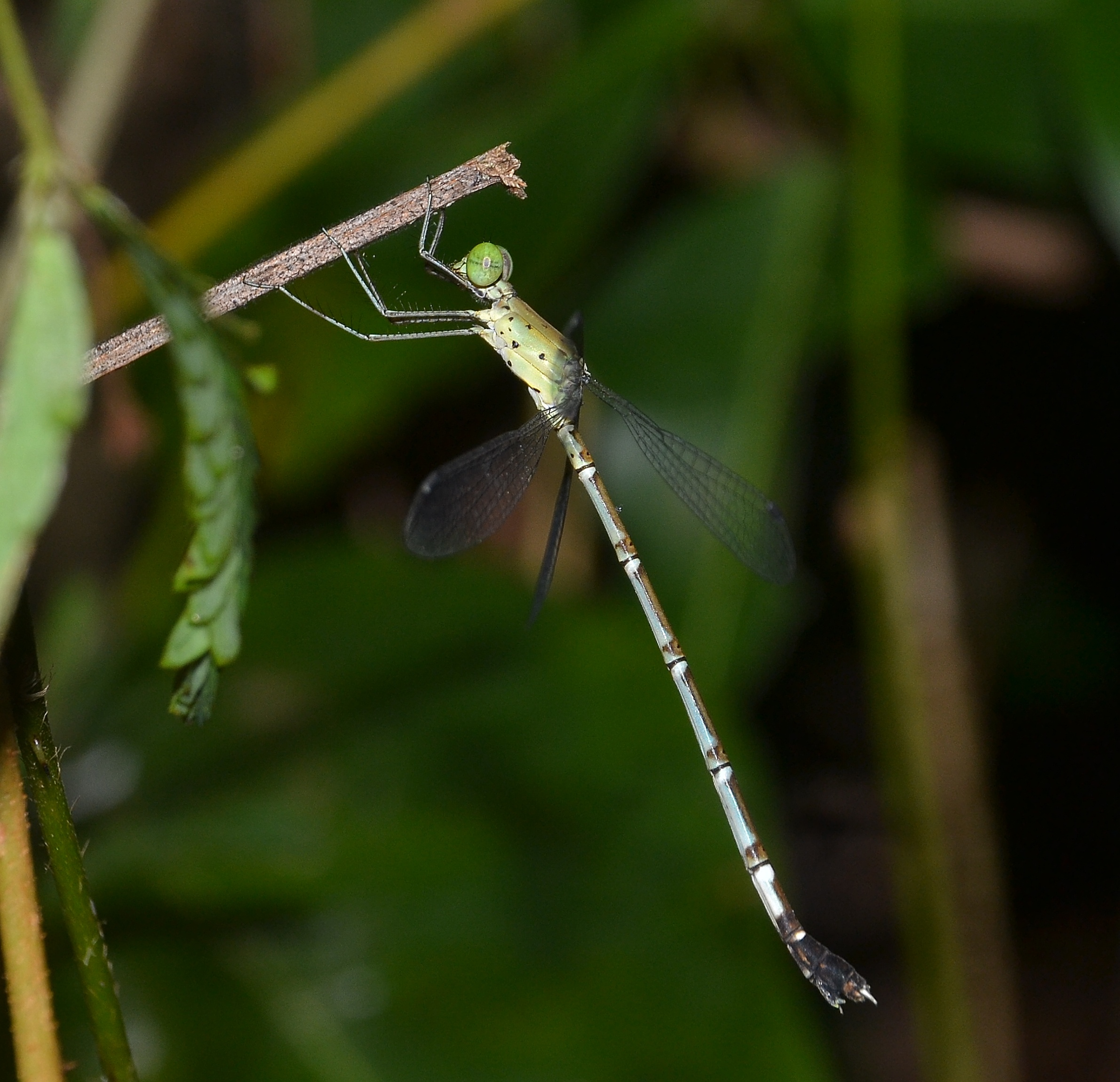
- Platylestes platystylus

Scientific classification
- Kingdom: Animalia
- Phylum: Arthropoda
- Clade: Pancrustacea
- Class: Insecta
- Order: Odonata
- Suborder: Zygoptera
- Family: Lestidae
- Genus: Platylestes; Selys, 1862

= Platylestes =

Genus of damselflies

Platylestes is a genus of stalk-winged damselflies in the family Lestidae. There are at least five described species in Platylestes.

== Species ==
These four species belong to the genus Platylestes:

Male	Female	Scientific name	Common name	Distribution
		Platylestes heterostylus Lieftinck, 1932		Java
		Platylestes kirani Emiliyamma, Palot & Charesh, 2020		Kerala, South India.
		Platylestes pertinax Lieftinck, 1932		Bengal and Myanmar
		Platylestes platystylus (Rambur, 1842)		Thailand, Vietnam, Laos and Kerala, South India.
