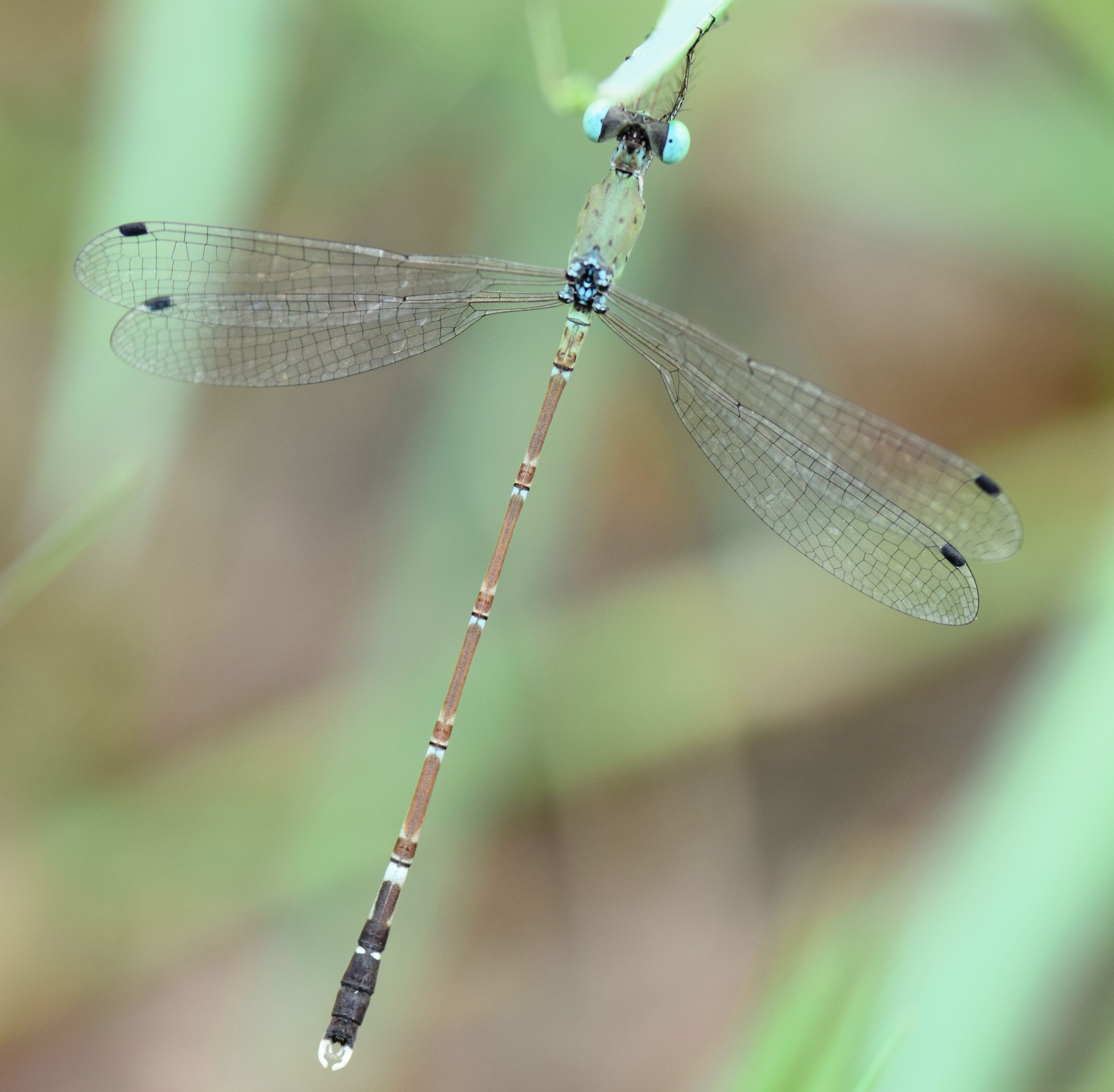
- Male
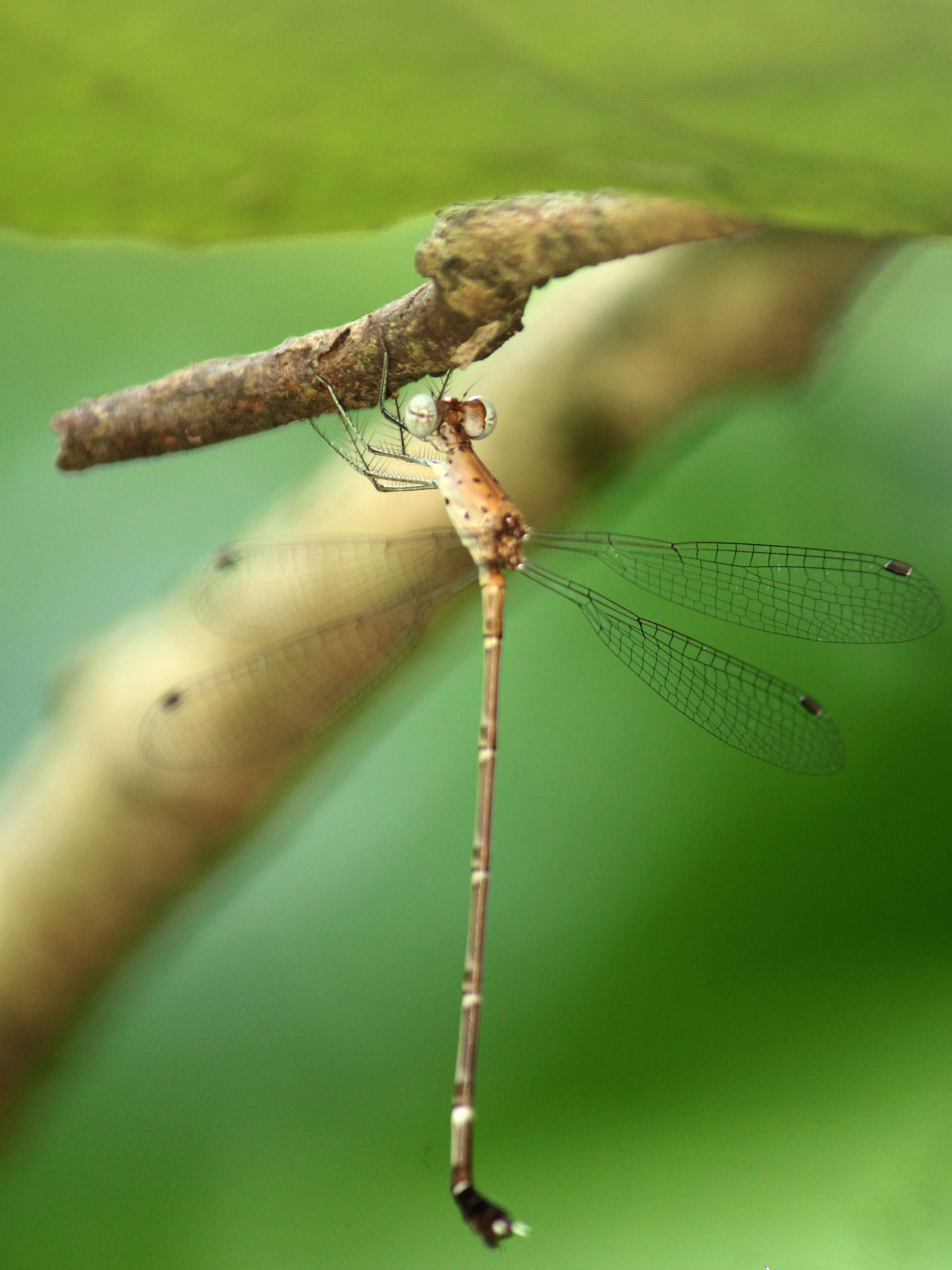
- Female

Conservation status
- Least Concern (IUCN 3.1)

Scientific classification
- Kingdom: Animalia
- Phylum: Arthropoda
- Clade: Pancrustacea
- Class: Insecta
- Order: Odonata
- Suborder: Zygoptera
- Family: Lestidae
- Genus: Platylestes
- Species: P. platystylus

Binomial name
- Platylestes platystylus (Rambur, 1842)

Synonyms
- Lestes platystyla Rambur, 1842

= Platylestes platystylus =

Species of damselfly

Platylestes platystylus, the green-eyed spreadwing, is a damselfly species in the family Lestidae. Although this species appears to be widespread, there are very few recent records. This species is known from old records from West Bengal in India, Myanmar (Fraser 1933), Thailand (Hämäläinen and Pinratana 1999) and Laos (Yokoi 2001). There are recent records from Thailand, Vietnam, Laos and Kerala, South India.

== Description and habitat ==
It is a small dull colored damselfly of the size of Lestes. Its prothorax and thorax are in palest khaki brown color, paler at the sides and pruinosed white beneath. There are a large number of black spots on the thorax. Its wings are palely smoked with short and broad pterostigma having white or pale inner and outer ends. Its abdomen is in olivaceous to warm reddish brown in color with black apical rings on each segments. Anal appendages are whitish with the superiors black at base, curling in at apices to meet each other. Inferior appendages are about half the length and thick at base.

Female closely resembles the male in most respects, differing mainly in sexual characters. Anal appendages are yellow, blackish brown at the base, and as long as segment 10.

The small black spots on each side of thorax and quadrate pterostigma with white at both ends are the most distinguishing features of this damselfly compared to other spreadwings.

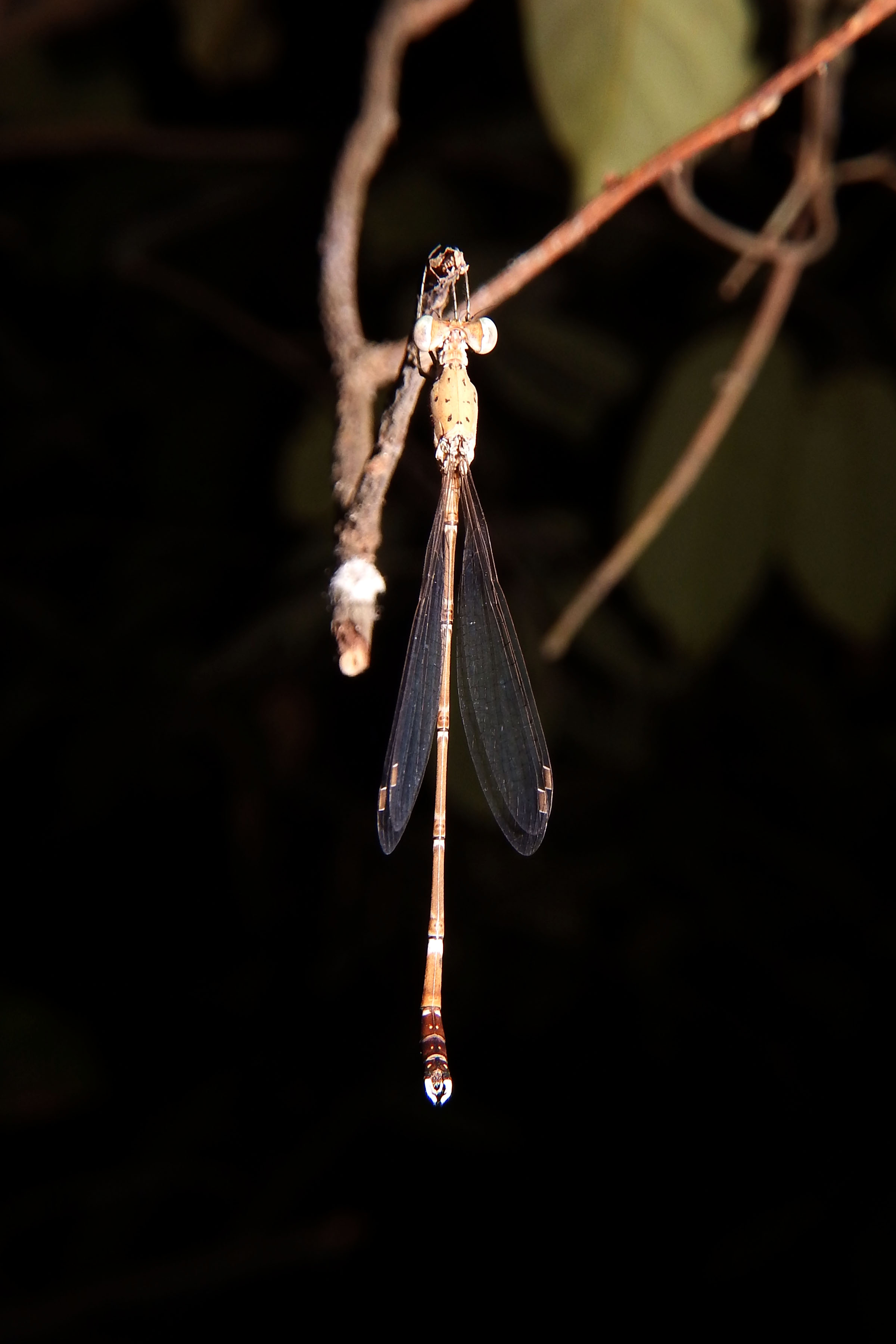
Dorsal view of male, showing black spots on thorax

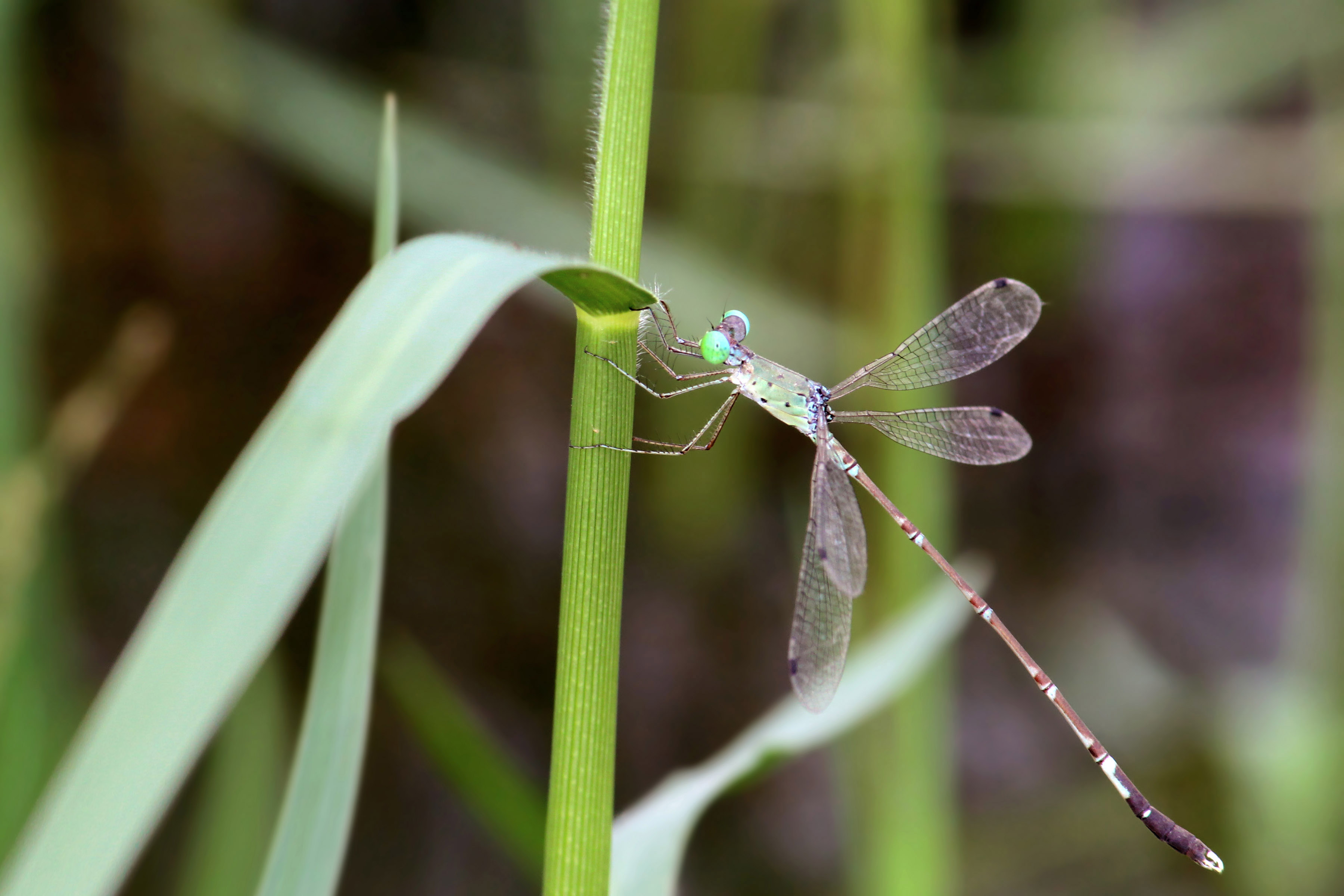
Lateral view of male

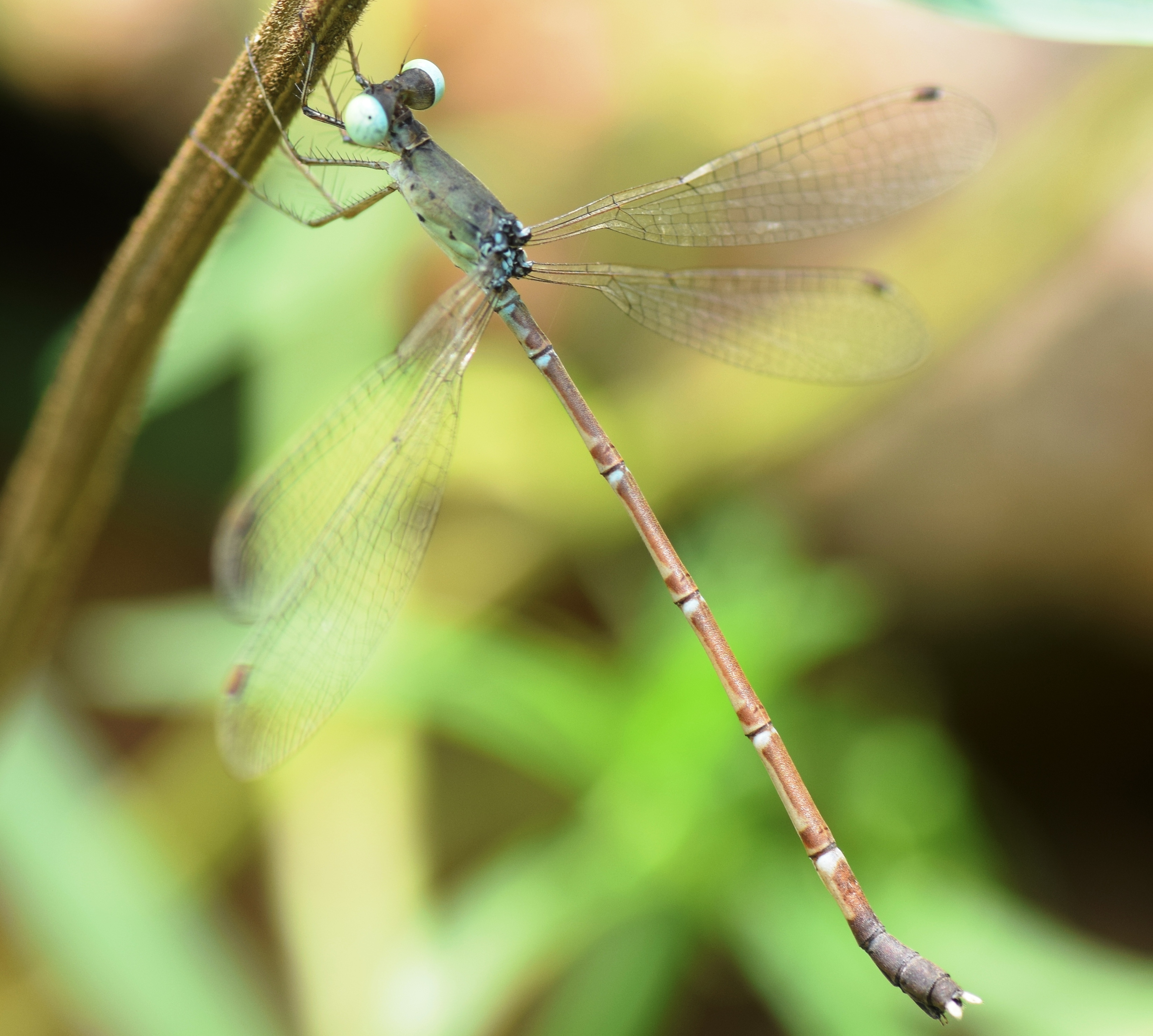
Female

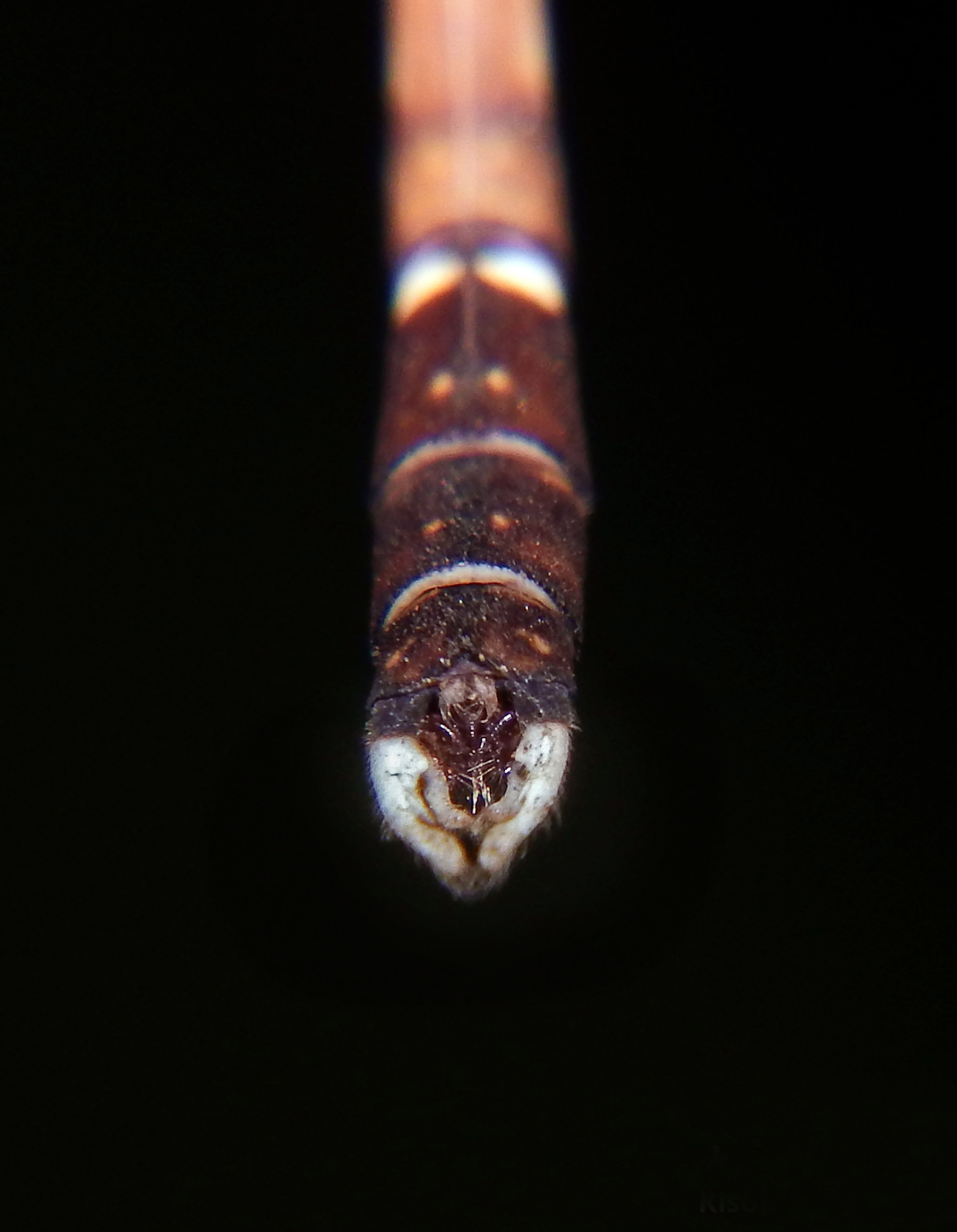
Terminal abdominal appendages of male

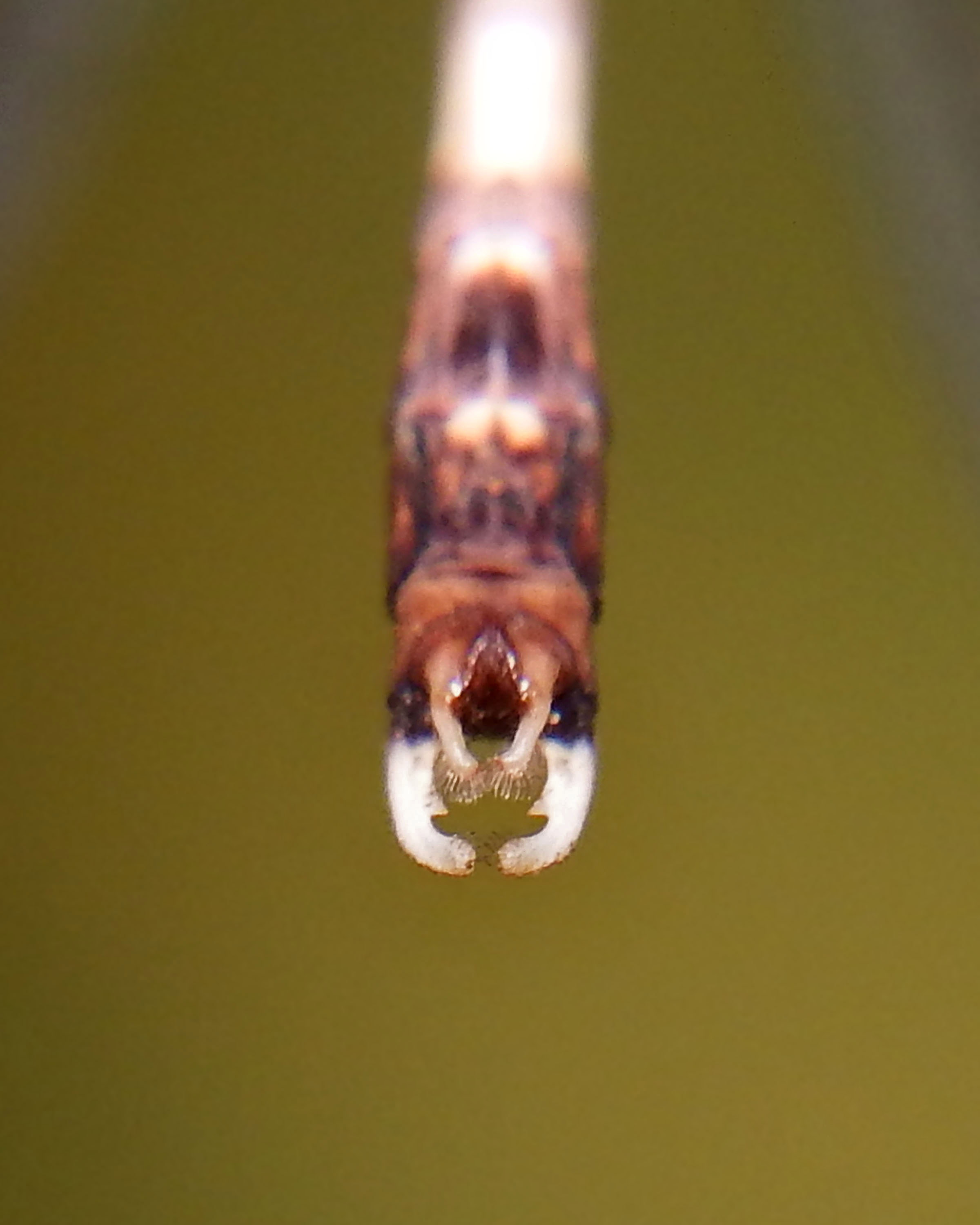
Ventral view of terminal abdominal appendages of male

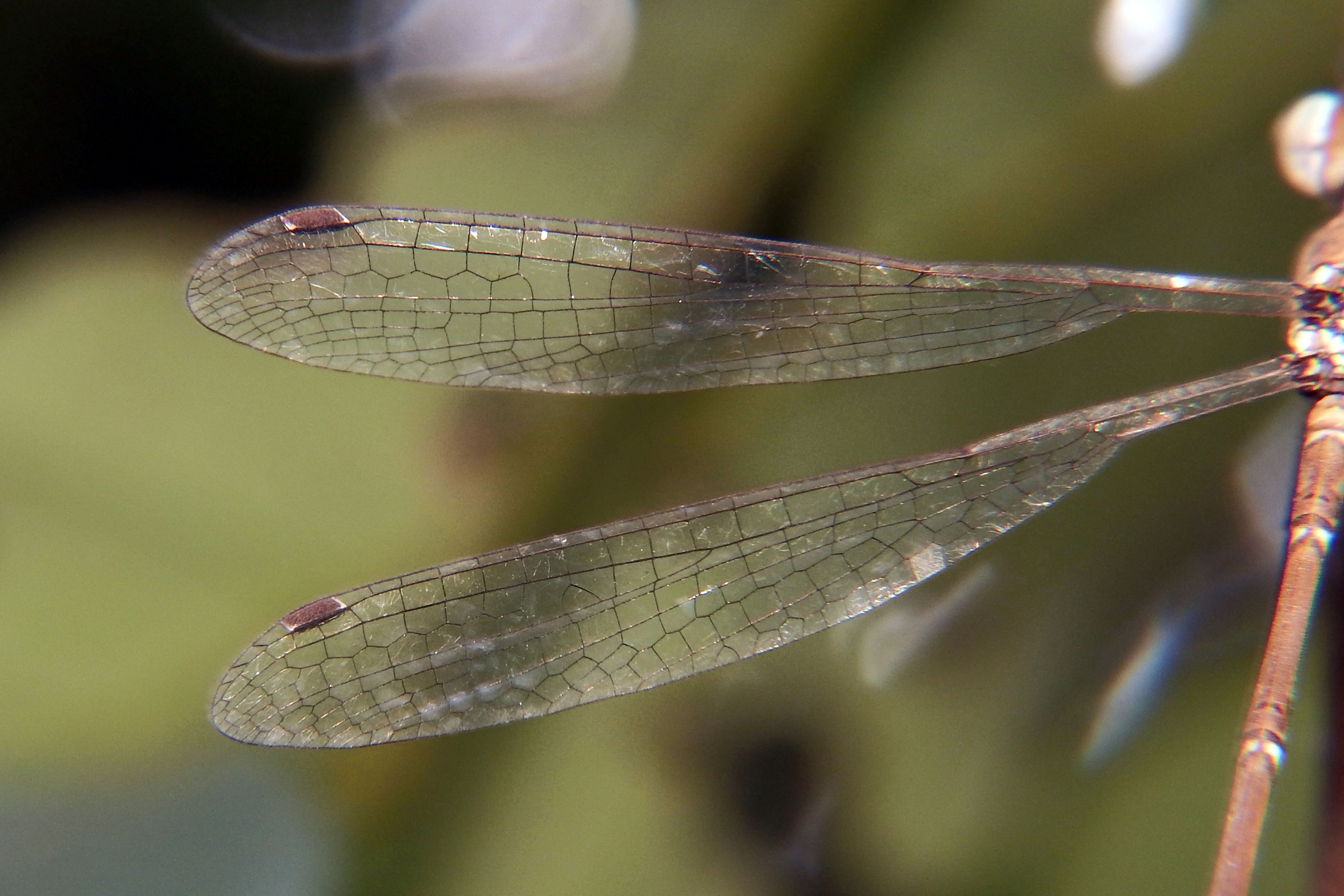
Wing details. Note the quadrate pterostigma with white at both ends

== See also ==
- List of odonates of India
- List of odonata of Kerala
