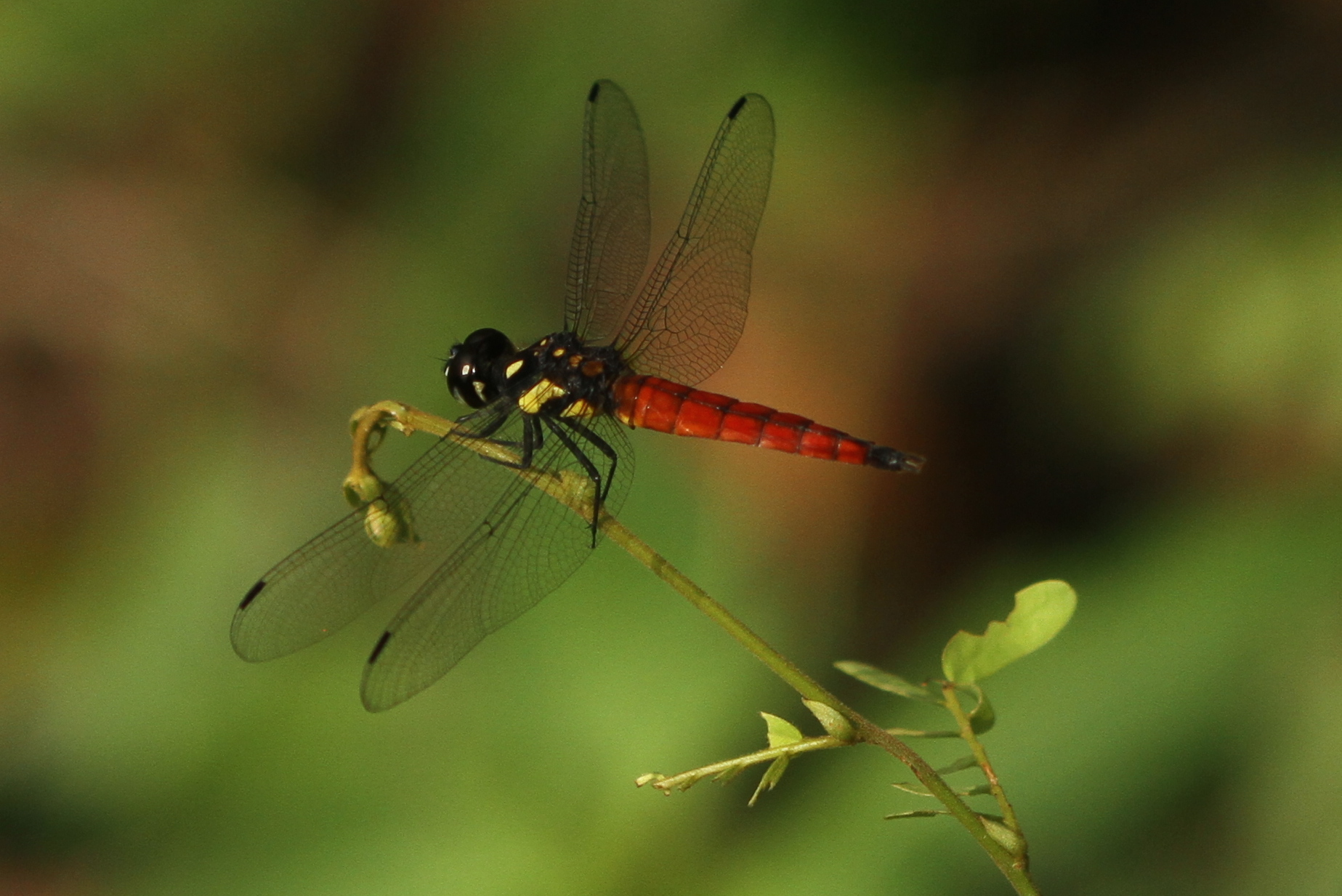
- Male

Scientific classification
- Kingdom: Animalia
- Phylum: Arthropoda
- Class: Insecta
- Order: Odonata
- Infraorder: Anisoptera
- Family: Libellulidae
- Genus: Lyriothemis
- Species: L. abrahami

Binomial name
- Lyriothemis abrahami Kalesh Sadasivan, Jebine Jose, Muhamed Jafer Palot, Shanas Sudheer, Toms Augustine, Baiju Kochunarayanan, Vinayan Padmanabhan Nair and Maya George, 2025

= Lyriothemis abrahami =

Species of dragonfly

Lyriothemis abrahami is a species of dragonfly in the family Libellulidae. It is found in Western Ghats of Southern India.

This dragonfly was previously misidentified as L. flava. In contrast to L. flava, the new species is sexually dimorphic, with males can be easily distinguished based on the characteristic shape of the hamules. Females can be distinguished by their jet-black and yellow color with triangular yellow streaks on the dorsum of the abdomen.

In India, Lyriothemis species were thought to be restricted to the northeastern states like Assam and West Bengal; but, in 2013, L. acigastra and L. flava were recorded in the southern state of Kerala. The recent study concluded that the species previously misidentified as L. flava was of the newly described species Lyriothemis abrahami. The species is named after Dr. Abraham Samuel, a pioneer of odonata studies in Kerala.

== Description ==
It is a medium-sized dragonfly with brown-capped greenish-yellow eyes. Its thorax is black on dorsum, yellow on sides. There is a thick black oblique stripe on the posterior half of mesepimeron and postero-lateral suture. Wings are transparent, tinted with amber-yellow at base. Abdomen is blood-red, marked with black. Segment 1 is narrowly bordered with ochreous yellow. Segments 2 and 3 are ochreous laterally. All segments have very narrow black borders. Segments 3 to 9 has a narrow mid-dorsal black stripe, faded in adults. Segment 10 is entirely black. Anal appendages are dark reddish-brown.

Female is similar to the male; but can be distinguished by their jet-black and yellow color with triangular yellow streaks on the dorsum of the abdomen.

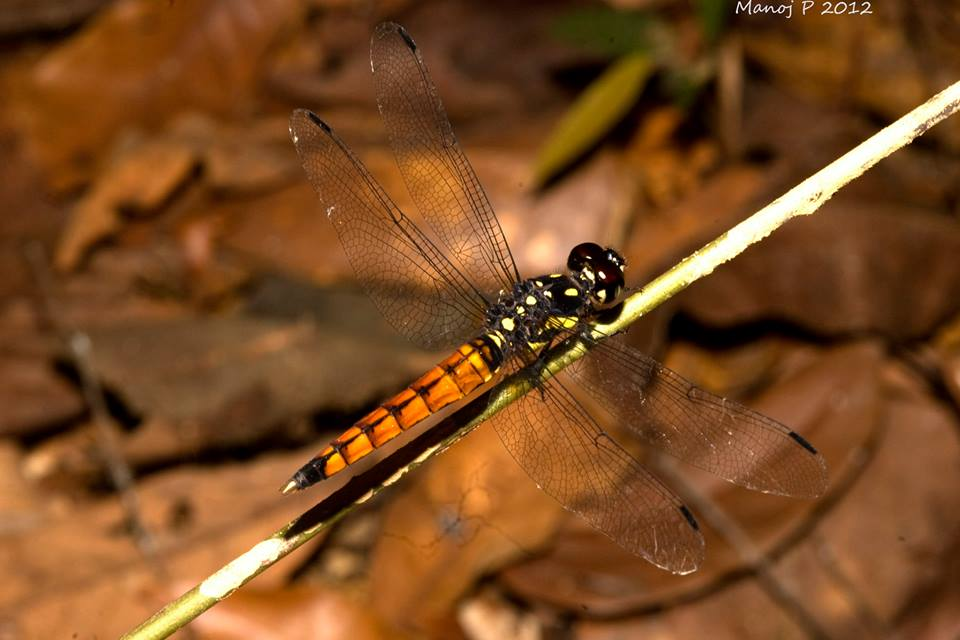
Male; dorsal view

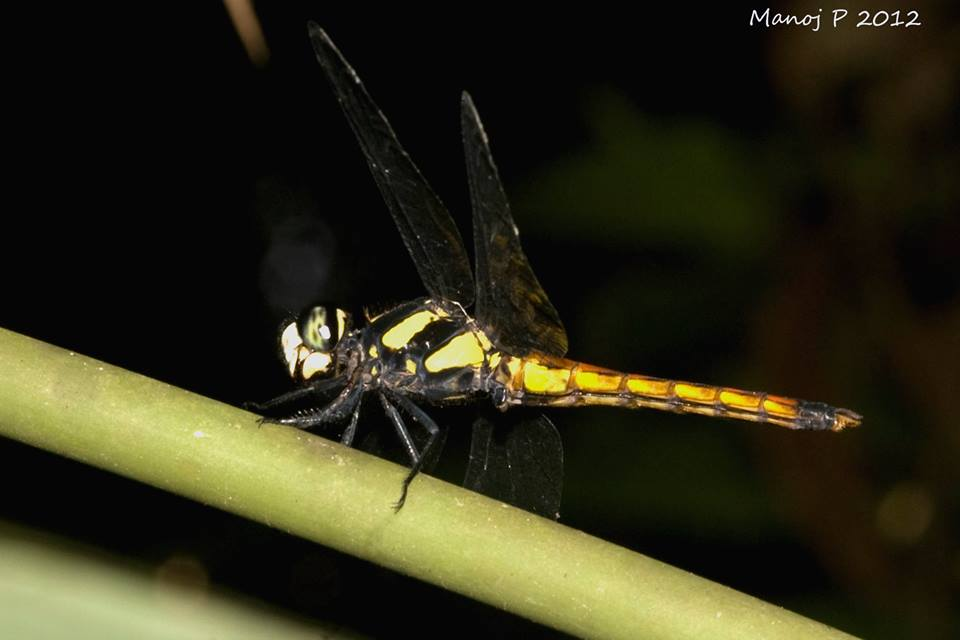
Male; side view

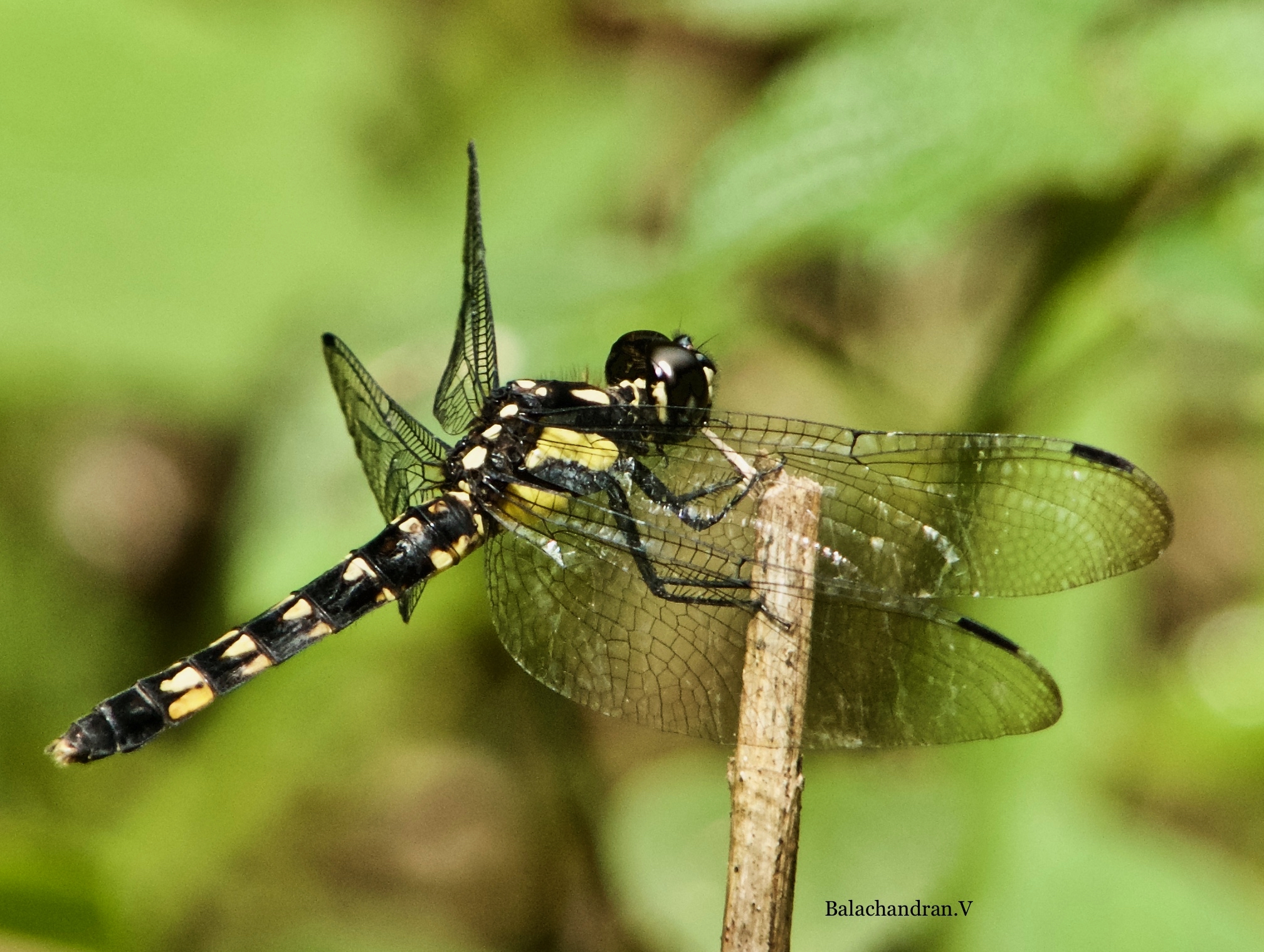
Female

== Habitat ==
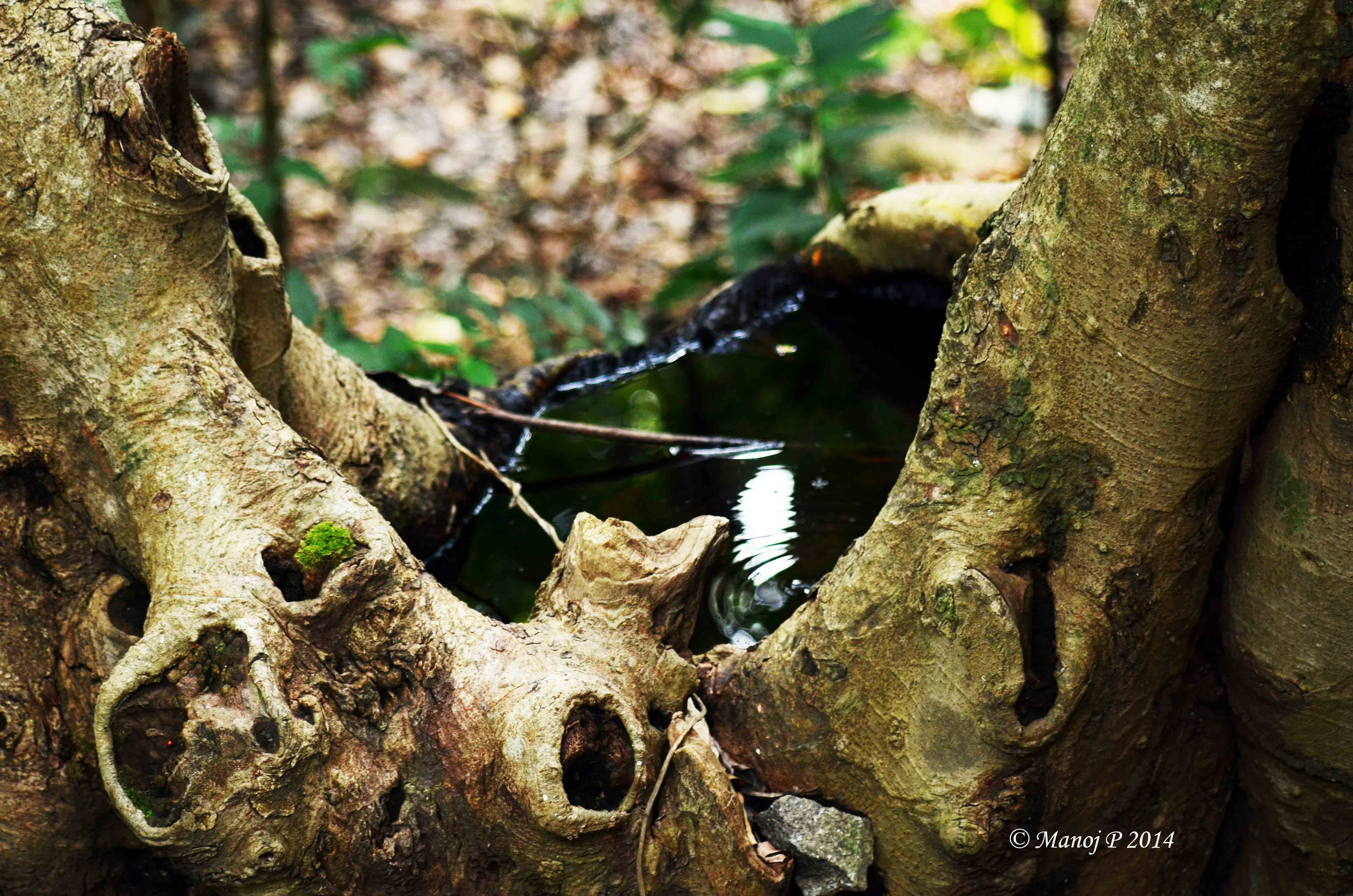
Lyriothemis abrahami breeds in the water collected in tree holes.

Its natural habitats are subtropical or tropical moist lowland forests and subtropical or tropical moist montane forests. Unlike other dragonflies and damselflies this species breeds in water collected inside the tree holes of evergreen and semi-evergreen forests.

== See also ==
- List of odonates of India
- List of odonata of Kerala
