= Lyriothemis flava =

Conservation status
- Least Concern (IUCN 3.1)

Scientific classification
- Kingdom: Animalia
- Phylum: Arthropoda
- Class: Insecta
- Order: Odonata
- Infraorder: Anisoptera
- Family: Libellulidae
- Genus: Lyriothemis
- Species: L. flava

Binomial name
- Lyriothemis flava Oguma, 1915

Synonyms
- Lyriothemis tricolor Ris, 1919

Species of dragonfly

Lyriothemis flava is a species of dragonfly in the family Libellulidae. It is found in Bangladesh, China, India, Japan, Myanmar, and Taiwan.

In India, Lyriothemis species were thought to be restricted to the northeastern states like Assam and West Bengal; but, in 2013, L. acigastra and L. flava were recorded in the southern state of Kerala. The recent study concluded that the species previously misidentified as L. flava in Kerala was of the newly described species Lyriothemis abrahami.

== Description ==
It is a medium-sized dragonfly with brown-capped greenish-yellow eyes. Its thorax is black on dorsum, yellow on sides. There is a thick black oblique stripe on the posterior half of mesepimeron and postero-lateral suture. Wings are transparent, tinted with amber-yellow at base. Abdomen is blood-red, marked with black. Segment 1 is narrowly bordered with ochreous yellow. Segments 2 and 3 are ochreous laterally. All segments have very narrow black borders. Segments 3 to 9 has a narrow mid-dorsal black stripe, faded in adults. Segment 10 is entirely black. Anal appendages are dark reddish-brown.

Female is similar to the male; but its thorax is coppery-brown and segments 3 to 8 with mid-dorsal carina rather broadly black.

== Habitat ==
Its natural habitats are subtropical or tropical moist lowland forests and subtropical or tropical moist montane forests. Unlike other dragonflies and damselflies this species breeds in water collected inside the tree holes of evergreen and semi-evergreen forests. Physicochemical parameters of water collected from the tree holes show that the water is generally acidic with high levels of total dissolved solids, phosphates, sulphates and nitrates. The pH varied from extremely acidic to (pH 3.56) to near neutral (pH 6.48). A diverse community of invertebrates and vertebrates coexist with L. tricolor larvae. It is not known how the different taxa interact in the community. However, the presence of predatory larvae of L. tricolor may significantly influence the community structure of tree holes.

== See also ==
- List of odonates of India
