= Lyriothemis bivittata =

Conservation status
- Least Concern (IUCN 3.1)

Scientific classification
- Kingdom: Animalia
- Phylum: Arthropoda
- Clade: Pancrustacea
- Class: Insecta
- Order: Odonata
- Infraorder: Anisoptera
- Family: Libellulidae
- Genus: Lyriothemis
- Species: L. bivittata

Binomial name
- Lyriothemis bivittata Rambur, 1842

Species of dragonfly

Lyriothemis bivittata is a species of dragonfly belonging to the family Libellulidae.

== Distribution ==
The species is found in India, Nepal, Myanmar, Laos, Thailand and Vietnam.

== Habitat ==
The species is found in inland waters and moist lowland forests between the elevations of 200 m and 1000 m. It breeds in the water collected inside tree holes.

== Threats ==
The species is faced by several threats, including logging, wood and pulp plantations, agro-industry farming, and environmental degradation.
