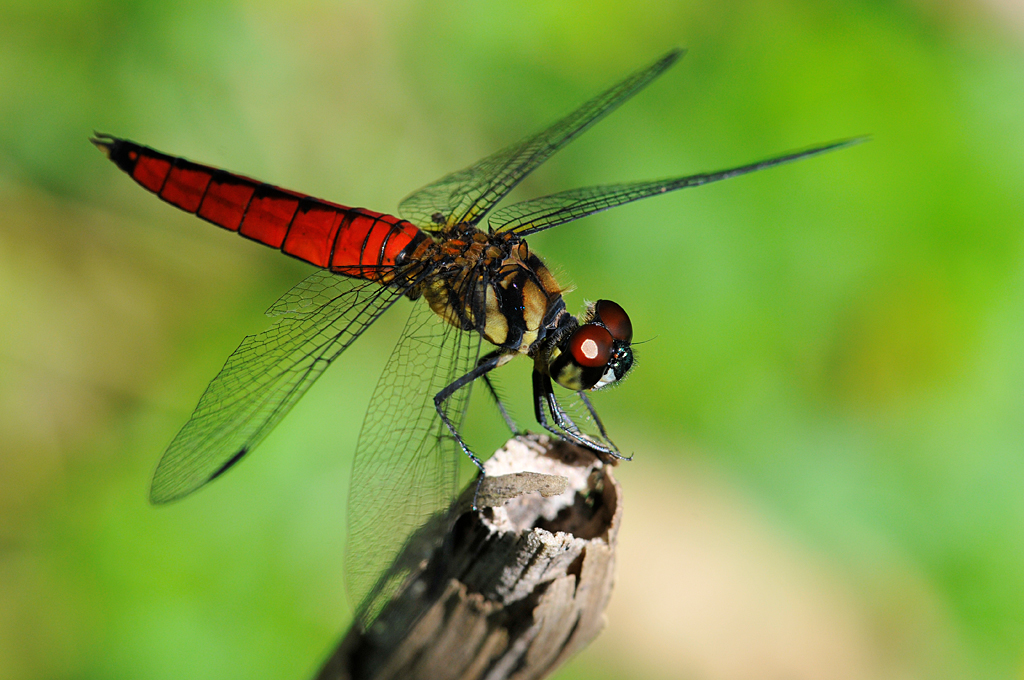
- Forest Chaser

Scientific classification
- Kingdom: Animalia
- Phylum: Arthropoda
- Class: Insecta
- Order: Odonata
- Infraorder: Anisoptera
- Family: Libellulidae
- Subfamily: Libellulinae
- Genus: Lyriothemis; Brauer, 1868

= Lyriothemis =

Genus of dragonflies

Lyriothemis is a genus of dragonfly in the family Libellulidae and belong to the suborder Anisoptera, found in eastern Asia. Some members of this genus lay their eggs in water-filled crevices and holes in trees and fallen logs.

== Species ==
The genus contains the following species:

Male	Female	Scientific name	Distribution
		Lyriothemis acigastra (Selys, 1878)	Burma, China and Tibet
		Lyriothemis biappendiculata (Selys, 1878)	Peninsular Malaysia
		Lyriothemis bivittata (Rambur, 1842)	India, Bhutan, Bangladesh
		Lyriothemis cleis Brauer, 1868	Bangladesh; Brunei; India; Indonesia; Malaysia (Peninsular Malaysia, Sabah, Sarawak); Myanmar; Philippines; Singapore; Thailand
		Lyriothemis defonsekai van der Poorten, 2009	Sri Lanka
		Lyriothemis elegantissima Selys, 1883 - Forest Chaser	Thailand, China
		Lyriothemis eurydice Ris, 1909	Celebes
		Lyriothemis hirundo Ris, 1913	New Guinea
		Lyriothemis latro Needham & Gyger, 1937	Philippines
		Lyriothemis magnificata (Selys, 1878)	Thailand, Borneo
		Lyriothemis meyeri (Selys, 1878)	New Guinea
		Lyriothemis mortoni Ris, 1919	India, Thailand, Myanmar, Vietnam
		Lyriothemis pachygastra (Selys, 1878)	China, Japan
		Lyriothemis salva Ris, 1927	Indonesia.
		Lyriothemis tricolor Selys, 1919	Bangladesh, China, India, Japan, Myanmar, and Taiwan.
