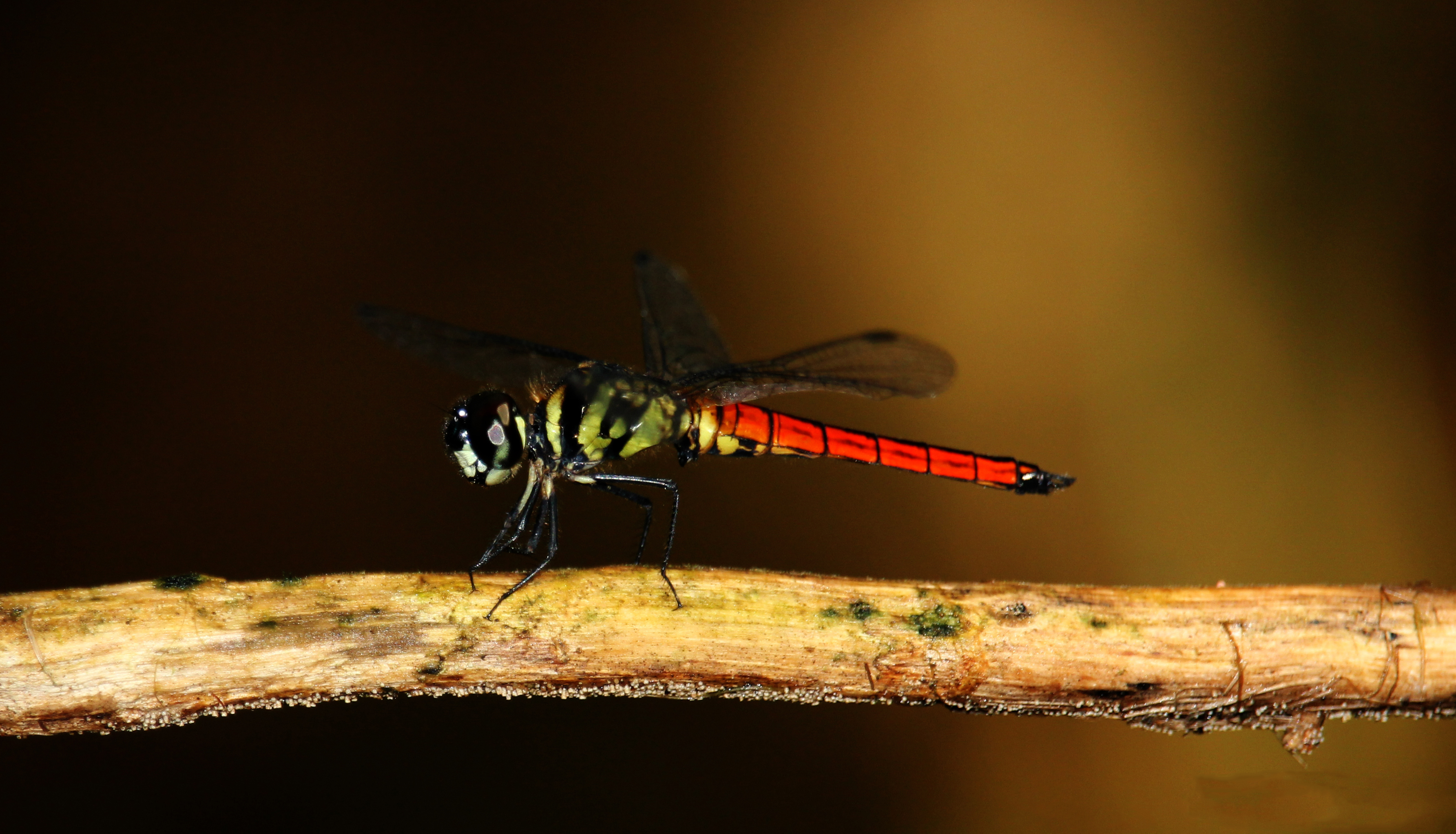

Conservation status
- Critically Endangered (IUCN 3.1)

Scientific classification
- Domain: Eukaryota
- Kingdom: Animalia
- Phylum: Arthropoda
- Class: Insecta
- Order: Odonata
- Infraorder: Anisoptera
- Family: Libellulidae
- Genus: Lyriothemis
- Species: L. defonsekai

Binomial name
- Lyriothemis defonsekai van der Poorten, 2009

= Lyriothemis defonsekai =

Species of dragonfly

Lyriothemis defonsekai is a species of dragonfly in the family Libellulidae. It is endemic to Sri Lanka.

== Sources ==
- defonsekai.html World Dragonflies
- Animal diversity web
- All Odonates
- Sri Lanka Biodiversity

=== See also ===
- List of odonates of Sri Lanka
