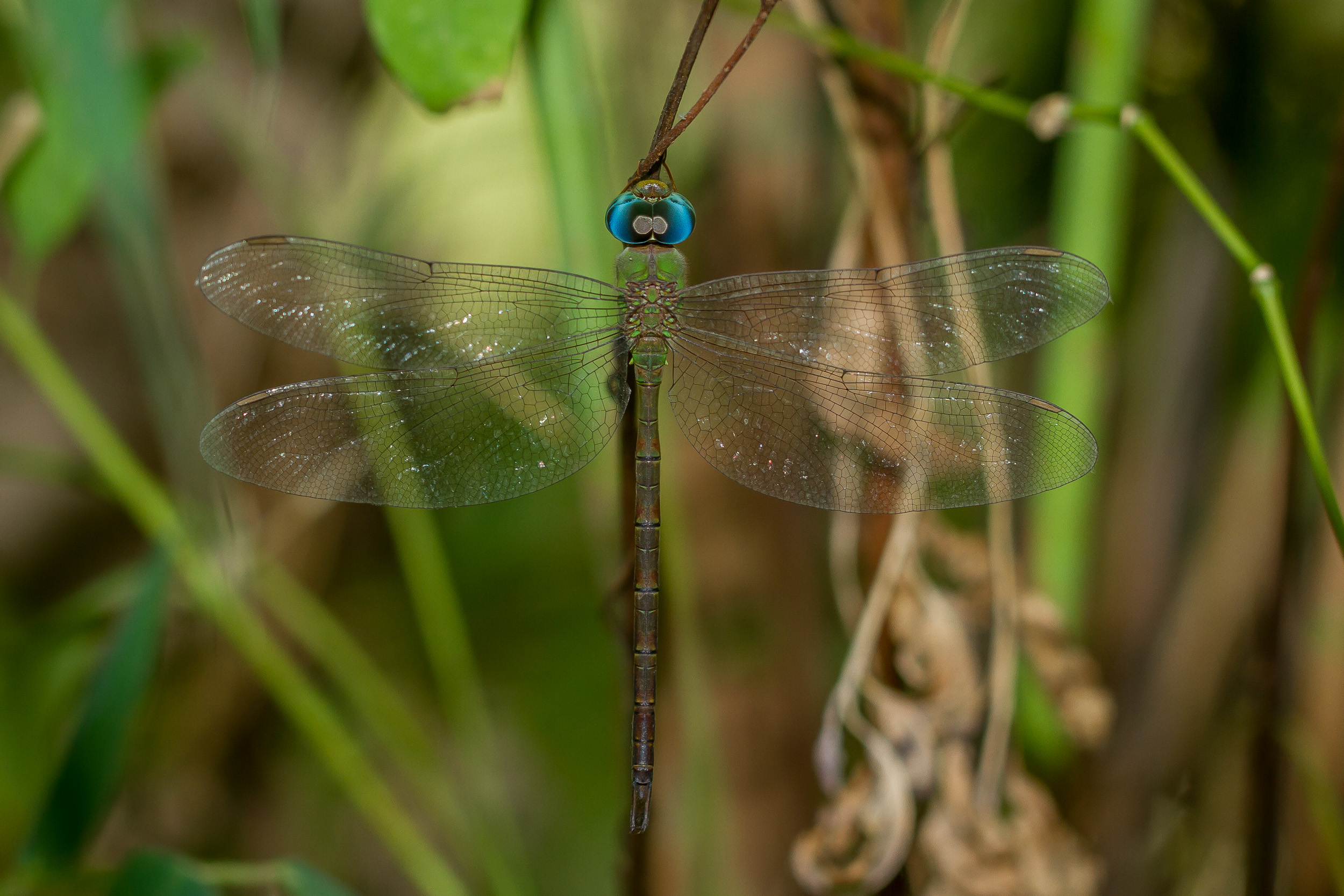

Conservation status
- Least Concern (IUCN 3.1)

Scientific classification
- Kingdom: Animalia
- Phylum: Arthropoda
- Class: Insecta
- Order: Odonata
- Infraorder: Anisoptera
- Family: Aeshnidae
- Genus: Gynacantha
- Species: G. bayadera

Binomial name
- Gynacantha bayadera Selys, 1891

Synonyms
- Gynacantha lyttoni Fraser, 1926

= Gynacantha bayadera =

Species of dragonfly

Gynacantha bayadera, parakeet darner or small duskhawker, is a species of dragonfly in the family Aeshnidae. It is found from India to South China and northern New Guinea. This is a crepuscular species which probably breeds in forested swamps and marshy areas, or in forest pools.

== Description and habitat ==
This is a slender dragonfly with abdomen constricted at the 3rd segment and colored a uniform parakeet green, sometimes turning olivaceous. Its thorax is green and abdomen is pale brown to reddish brown above with segments 1–3 grass green on the sides. It can be distinguished from other Gynacantha species as it has unmarked frons whereas Gynacantha dravida, Gynacantha basiguttata and Gynacantha subinterrupta have a "T-mark".

Fraser described Gynacantha millardi which resembles G. bayadera in its size, shape and colors. But it can be differentiated by the absence of the usual constriction of segment three which is very prominent in G. bayadera. G. millardi is considered as a synonym of G. bayadera in some literature and as a good species in some others.

It is crepuscular and flies low in shady places.

== See also ==
- List of odonates of India
- List of odonates of Sri Lanka
- List of odonata of Kerala
