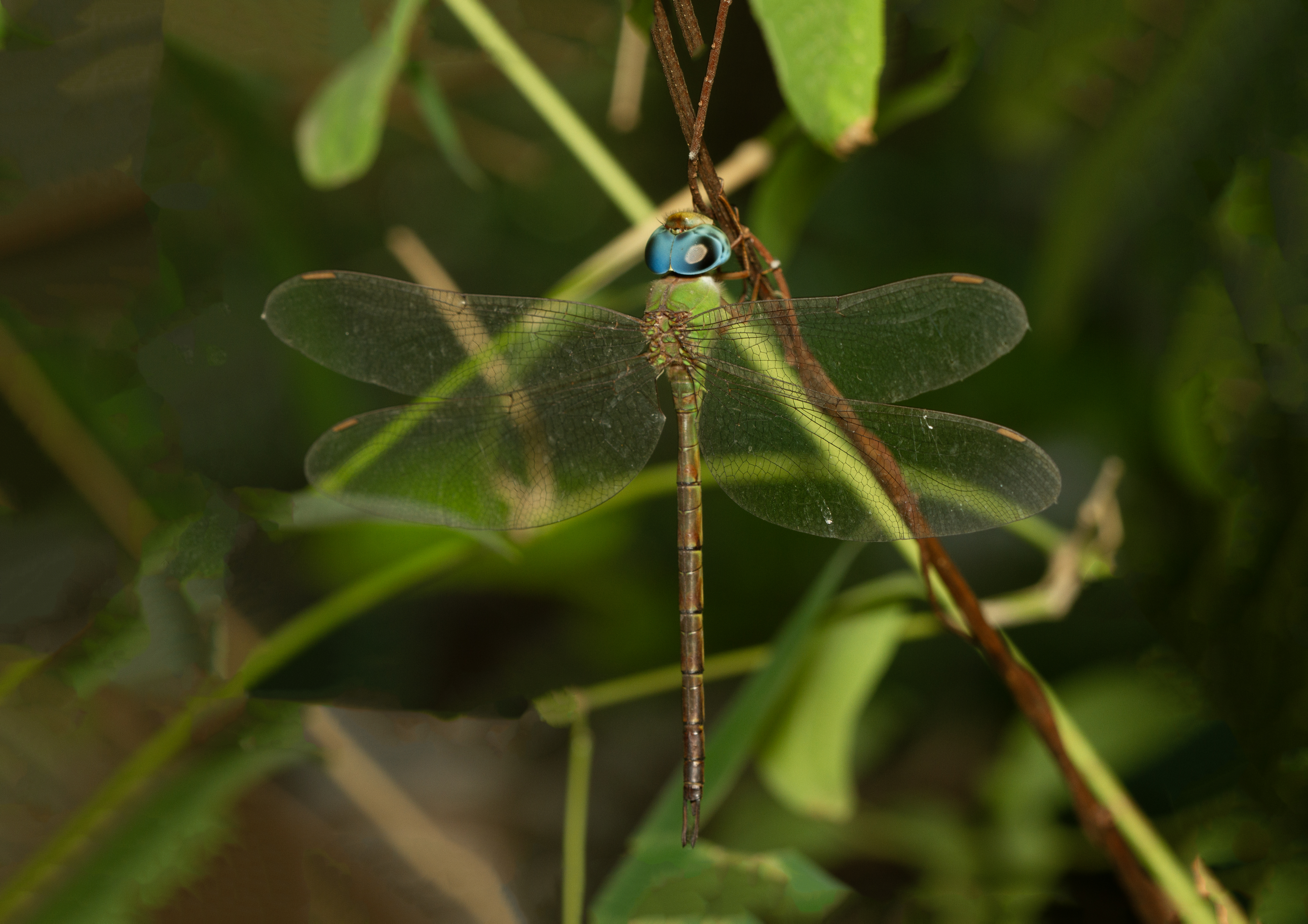
- Male

Scientific classification
- Kingdom: Animalia
- Phylum: Arthropoda
- Class: Insecta
- Order: Odonata
- Infraorder: Anisoptera
- Family: Aeshnidae
- Genus: Gynacantha
- Species: G. millardi

Binomial name
- Gynacantha millardi Fraser, 1920

= Gynacantha millardi =

Species of dragonfly

Gynacantha millardi, is a species of dragonfly in the family Aeshnidae. It is found from India and Sri Lanka. This is a crepuscular species which probably breeds in forested swamps and marshy areas, or in forest pools.

== Description and habitat ==
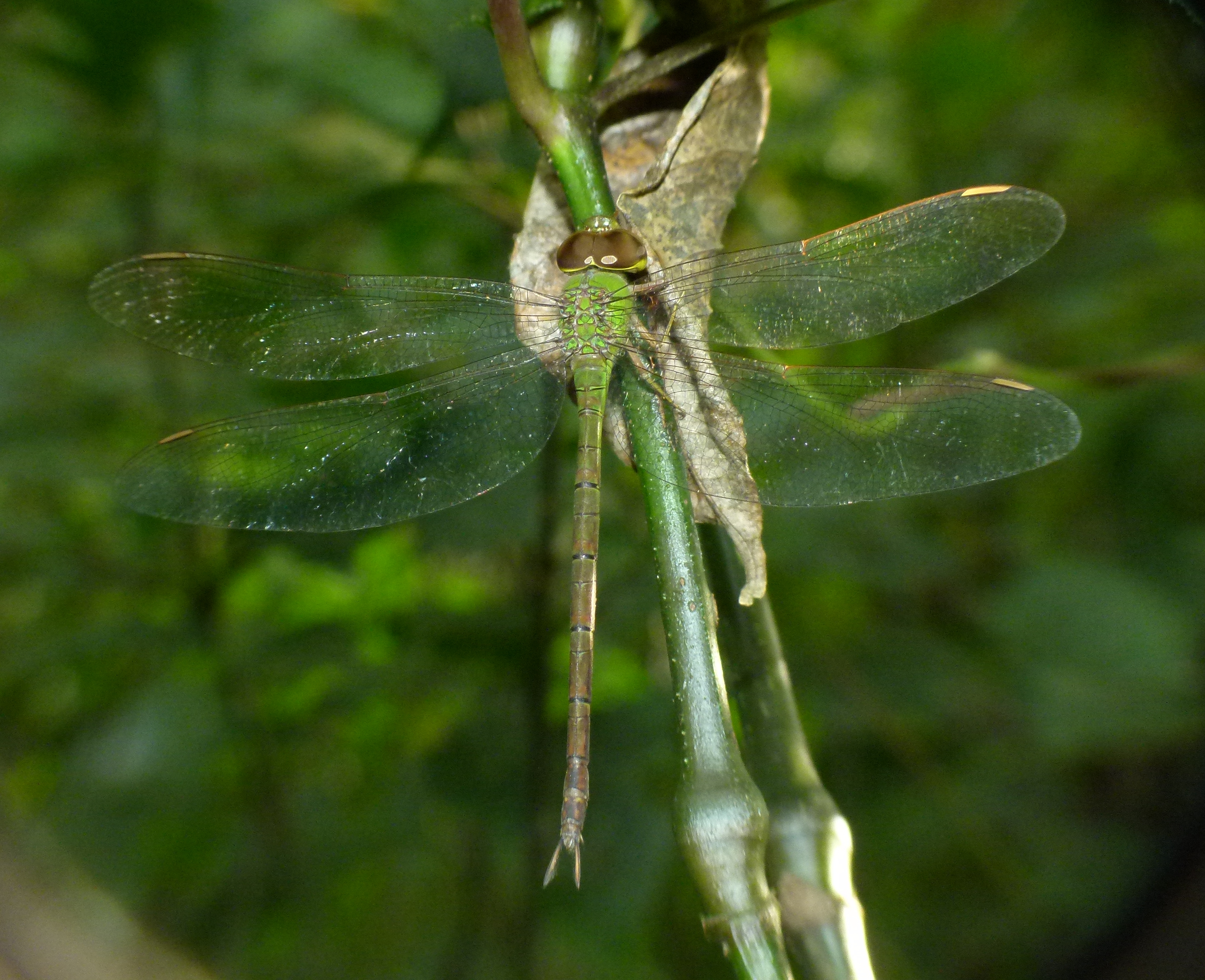
Female

This is a slender dragonfly with abdomen not constricted at the 3rd segment and colored a uniform pale green. Its thorax is green and abdomen is pale brown to reddish brown above with segments 1–3 grass green on the sides. It can be distinguished from other Gynacantha species as it has unmarked frons whereas Gynacantha dravida, Gynacantha basiguttata and Gynacantha subinterrupta have a "T-mark".

It resembles G. bayadera in its size, shape and colors. But it can be differentiated by the absence of the usual constriction of segment three which is very prominent in G. bayadera. G. millardi was considered as a synonym of G. bayadera earlier. But Priyadarshana et al. (2015) pointed out that it is a valid species and that its synonymy was based on an incorrect interpretation of a remark by Lieftinck (1930). Gynacantha millardi is currently known from India and Sri Lanka while the widespread G. bayadera is known from Northeast India to South China and northern New Guinea. It is unclear if the two species overlap in distribution and a review of records of both species from the Indian subcontinent is needed.

It is crepuscular and flies low in shady places.

== See also ==
- List of odonates of India
- List of odonates of Sri Lanka
- List of odonata of Kerala
