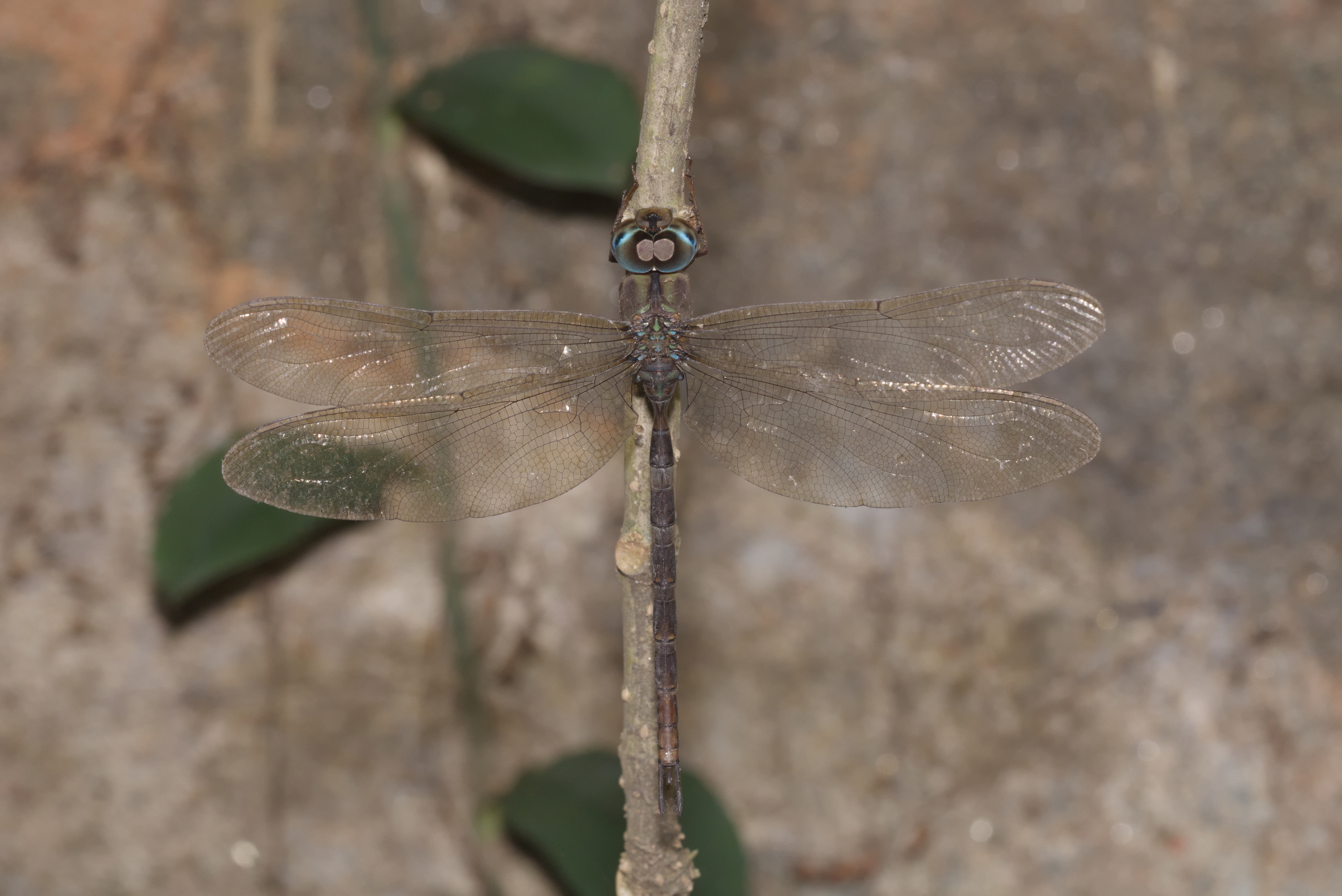
- Dorsal view

Conservation status
- Data Deficient (IUCN 3.1)

Scientific classification
- Kingdom: Animalia
- Phylum: Arthropoda
- Class: Insecta
- Order: Odonata
- Infraorder: Anisoptera
- Family: Aeshnidae
- Genus: Gynacantha
- Species: G. dravida

Binomial name
- Gynacantha dravida Lieftinck, 1960

= Gynacantha dravida =

Species of dragonfly

Gynacantha dravida, also known as Indian duskhawker or brown darner, is a species of dragonfly in the family Aeshnidae. It is found in India and Sri Lanka.

== Description and habitat ==
It is a large dragonfly characterized by its homogeneous colouring of dull browns and greens, by its long and thin anal appendages, and by its crepuscular habits. Its principal food appears to be mosquitoes and microlepidoptera. During the day, it rests in dark thickets. Fully matured specimens have bright colours; blues and greens, developing very late in life. Young specimens have brown color with some dark shades. Females are exactly similar to the males in colors and markings.

It is very closely related to Gynacantha subinterrupta and it is difficult to distinguish them. But the relative lengths of the superior and inferior anal appendages are different. The inferior being more than one-third the length of superiors in G. dravida and less than one-third in G. subinterrupta.

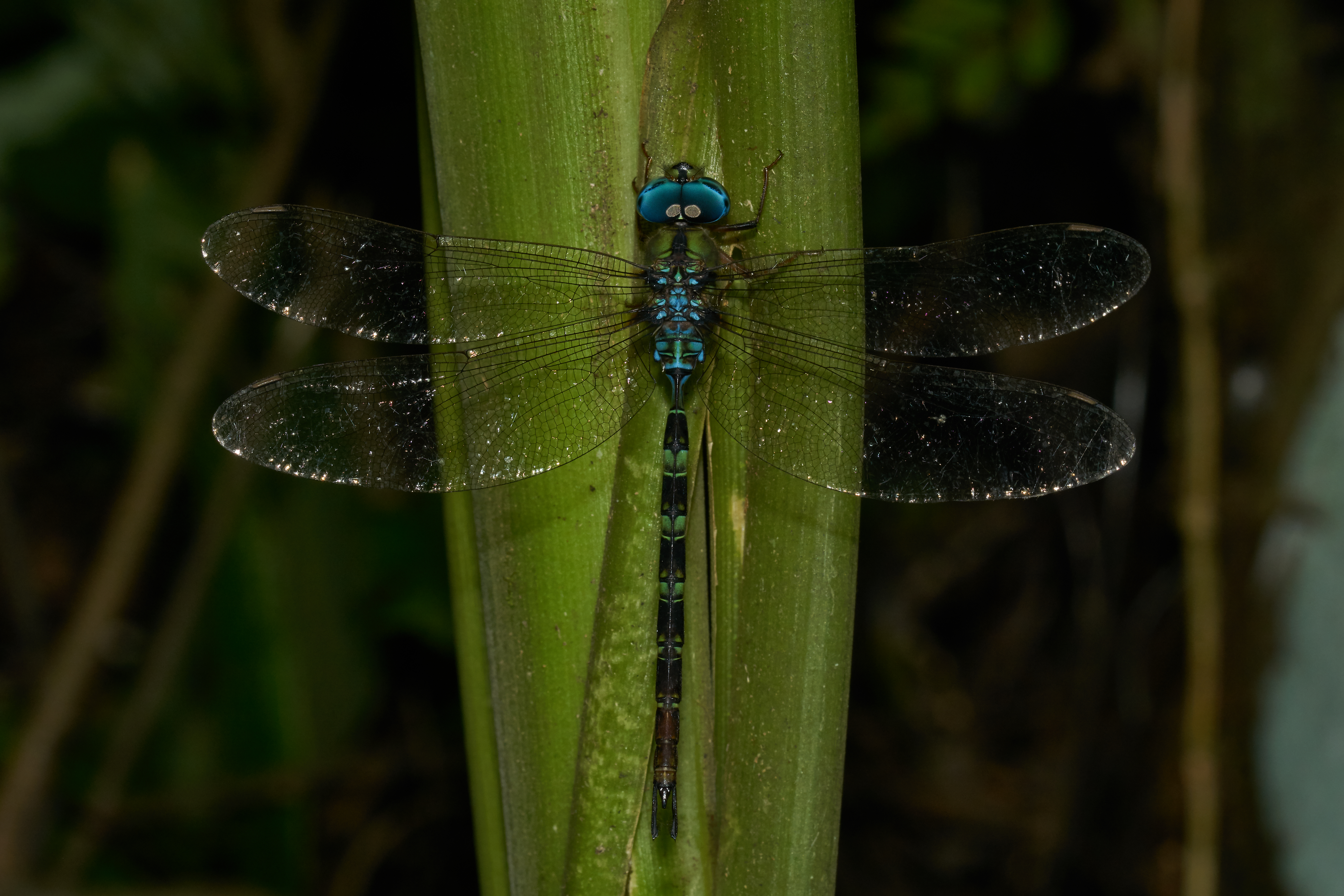
Male

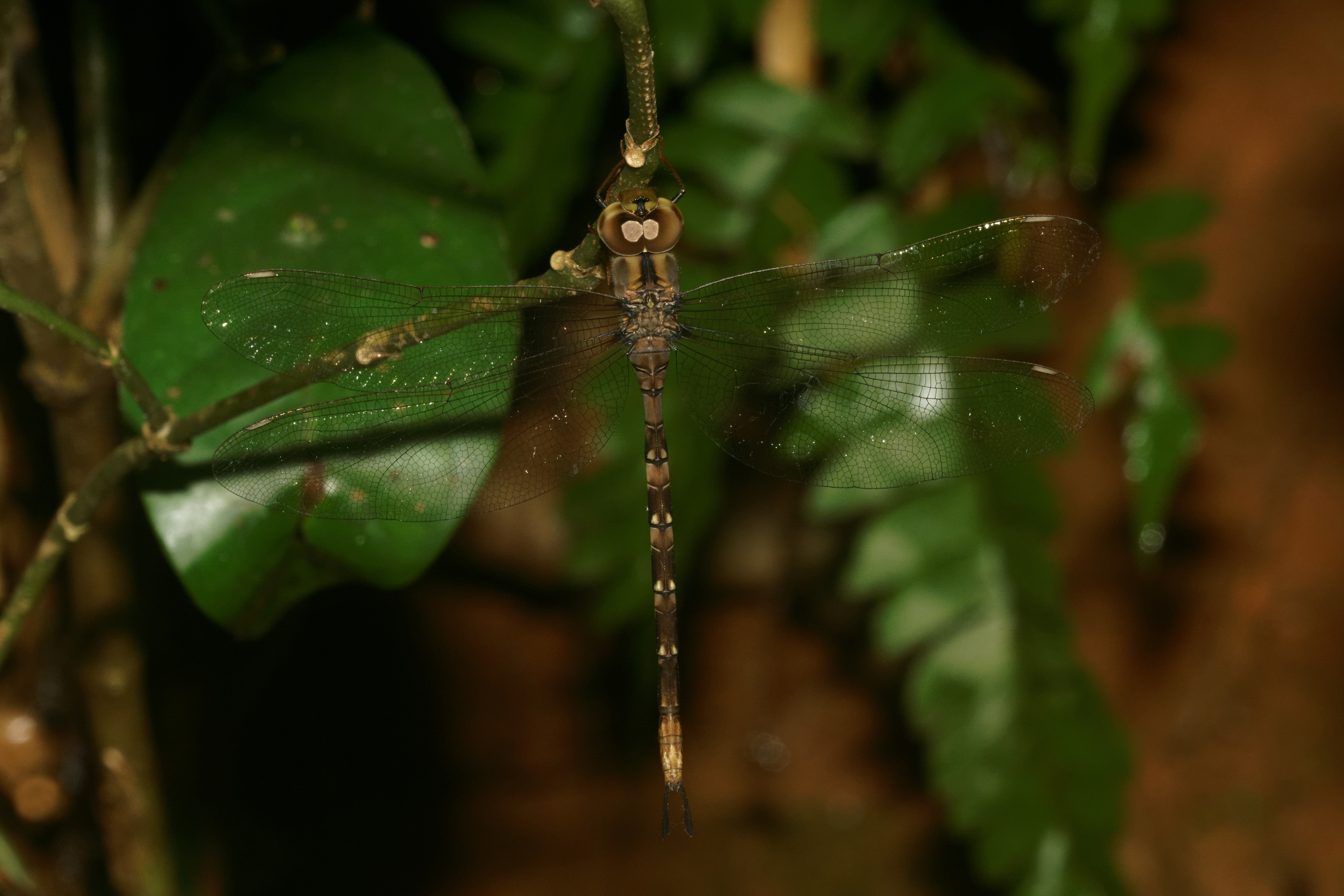
Female

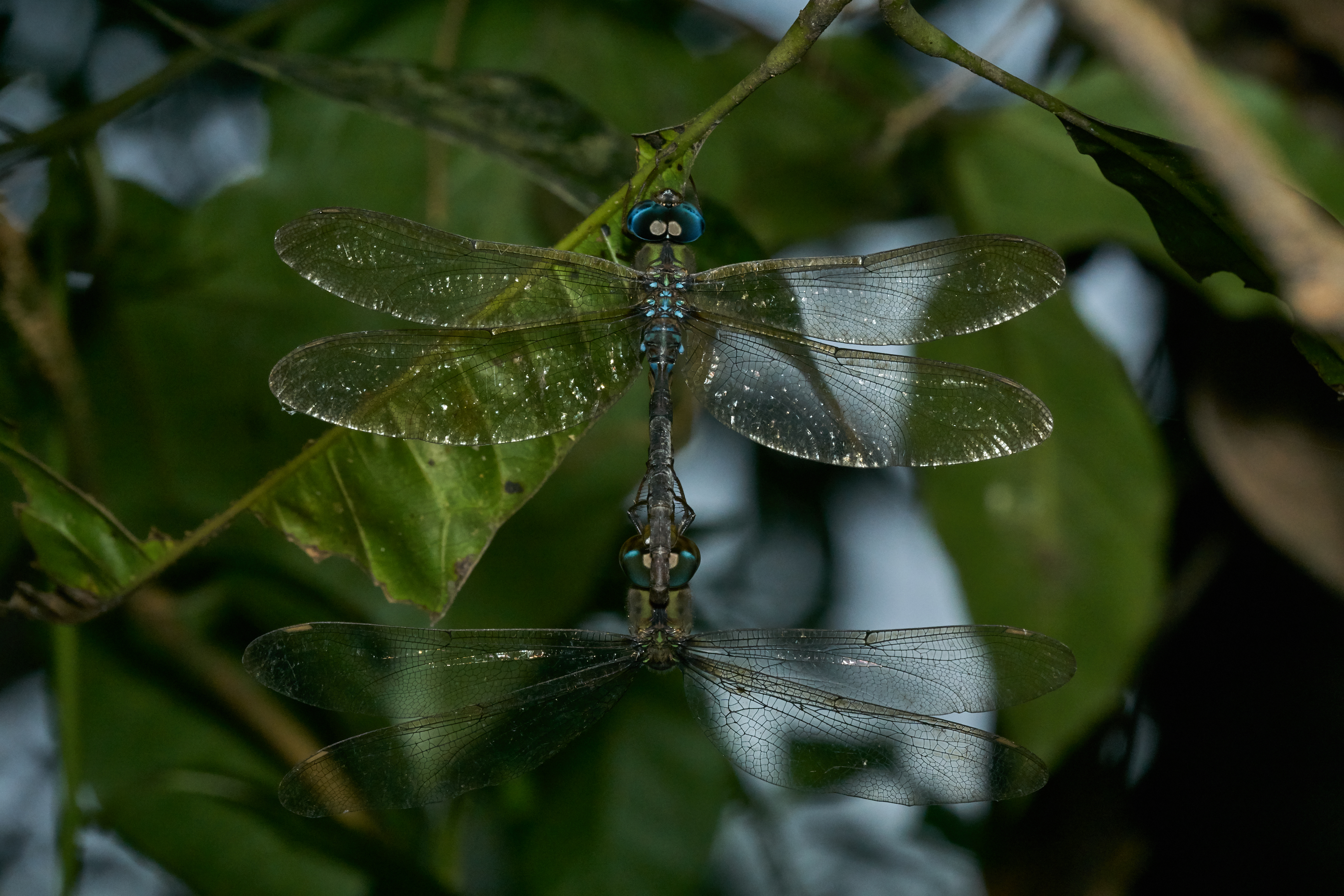
Mating pair

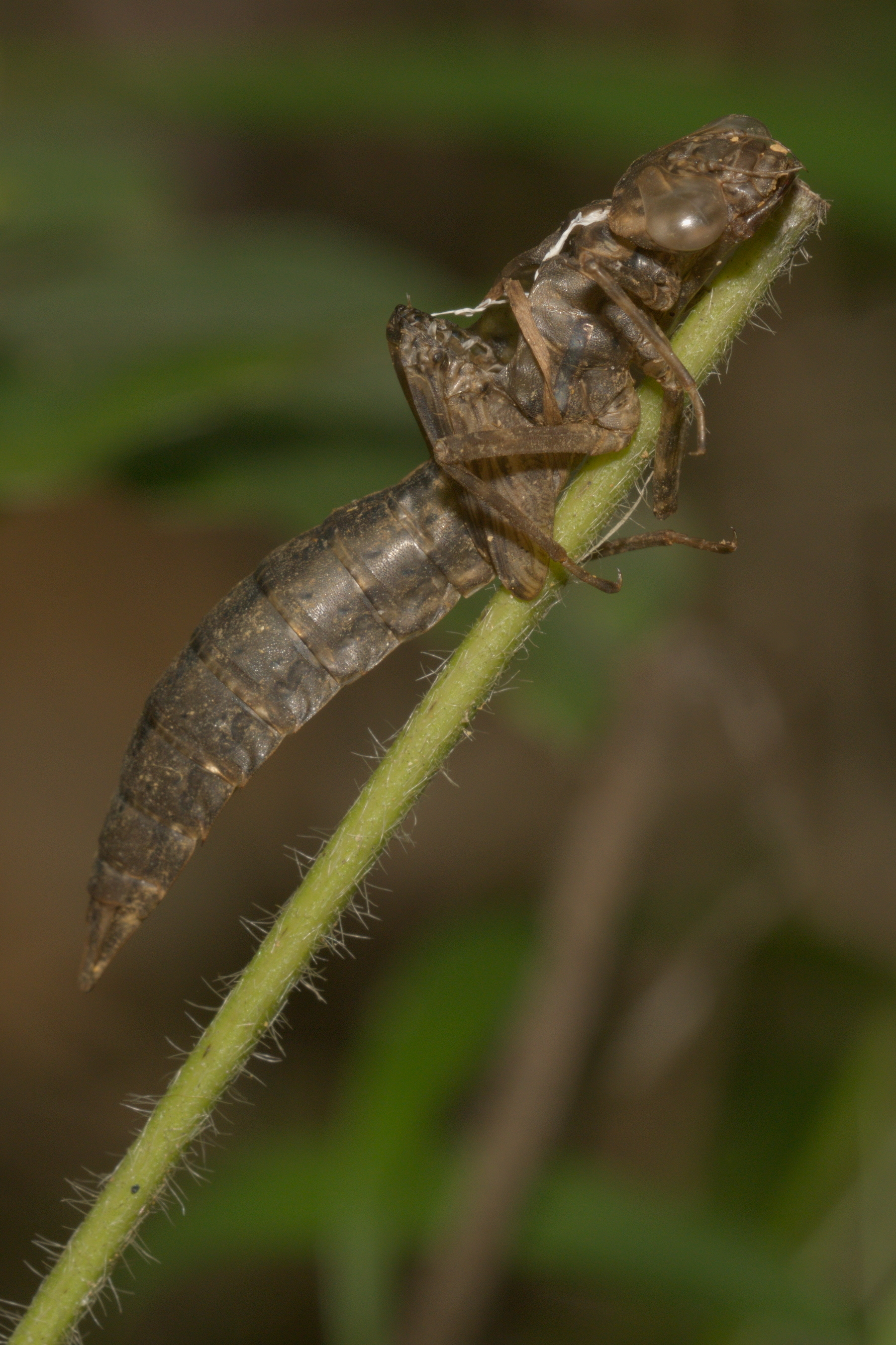
Exuvia

== See also ==
- List of odonates of India
- List of odonates of Sri Lanka
- List of odonata of Kerala
