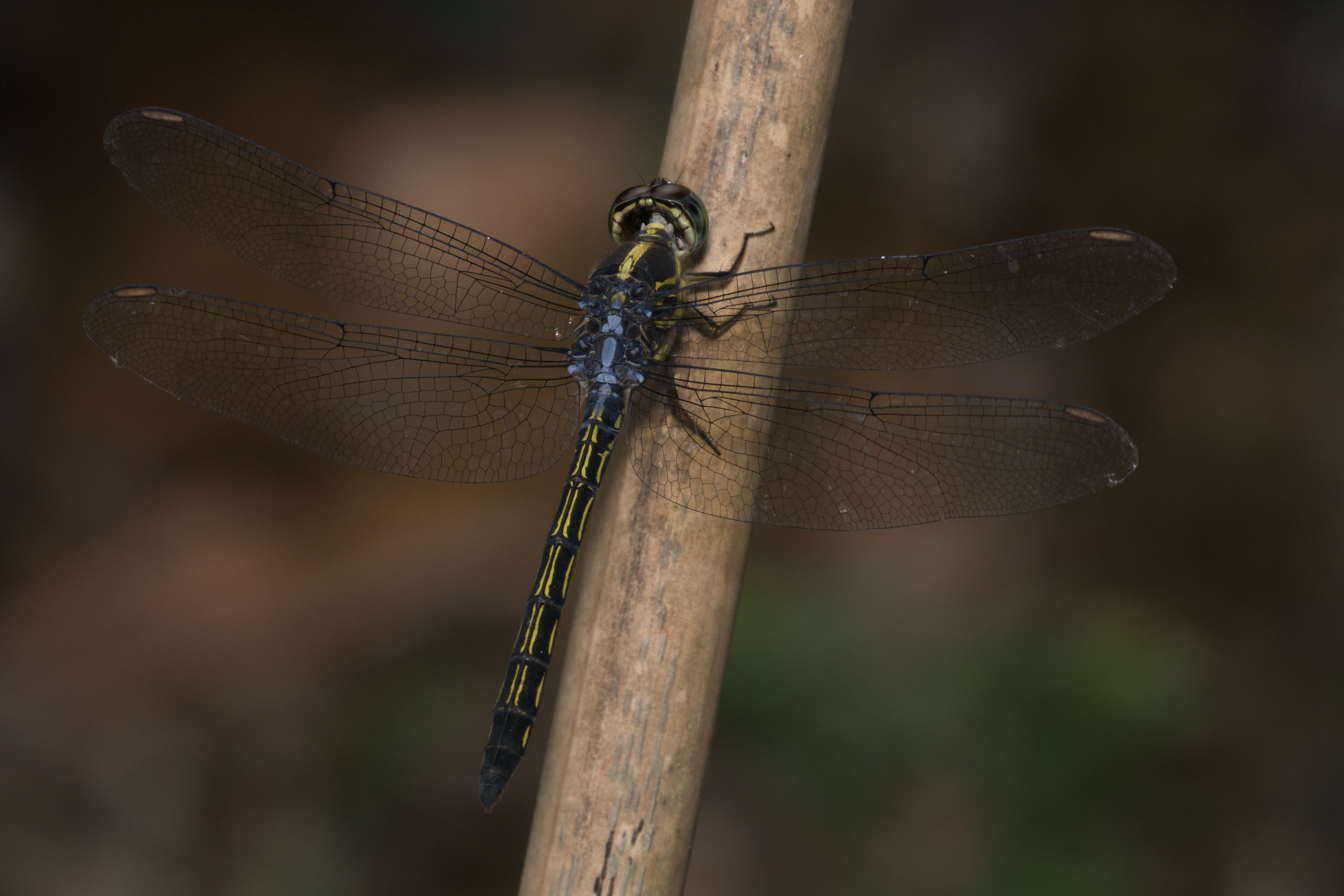
- Cratilla lineata male

Scientific classification
- Kingdom: Animalia
- Phylum: Arthropoda
- Class: Insecta
- Order: Odonata
- Infraorder: Anisoptera
- Family: Libellulidae
- Genus: Cratilla; Kirby, 1900

Species
- See text

= Cratilla =

Genus of dragonflies

Cratilla is a genus of dragonflies in the family Libellulidae. They are distributed in Southeast Asia.

== Species ==
Species include:

Male	Female	Scientific name	Common name	Distribution
		Cratilla lineata	line forest-skimmer, emerald-banded skimmer or pale-faced forest-skimmer	Asia
		Cratilla metallica		India
