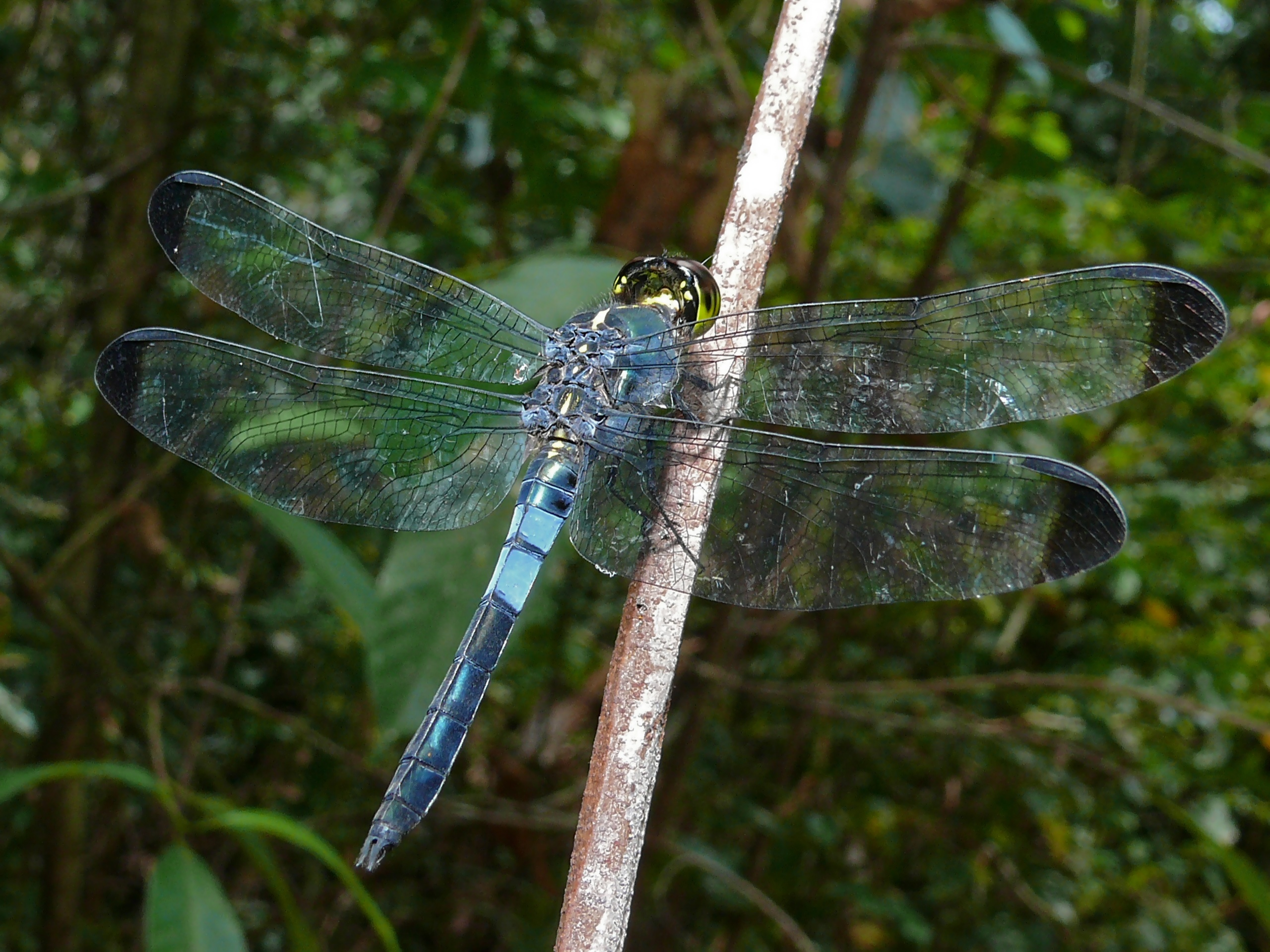

Conservation status
- Least Concern (IUCN 3.1)

Scientific classification
- Domain: Eukaryota
- Kingdom: Animalia
- Phylum: Arthropoda
- Class: Insecta
- Order: Odonata
- Infraorder: Anisoptera
- Family: Libellulidae
- Genus: Cratilla
- Species: C. metallica

Binomial name
- Cratilla metallica (Brauer, 1878)

= Cratilla metallica =

Species of dragonfly

Cratilla metallica is a species of dragonflies in the family Libellulidae.
