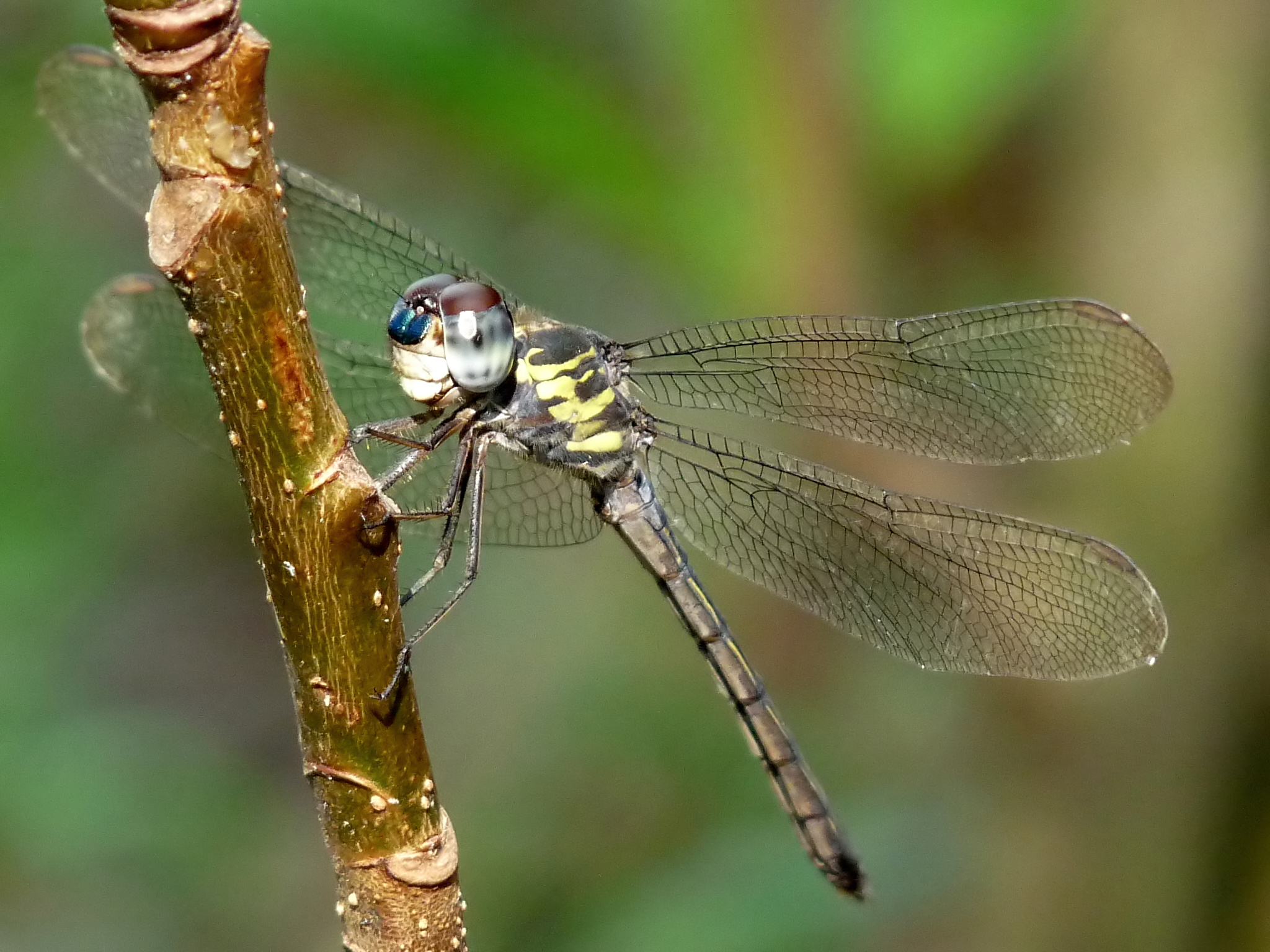
- Male
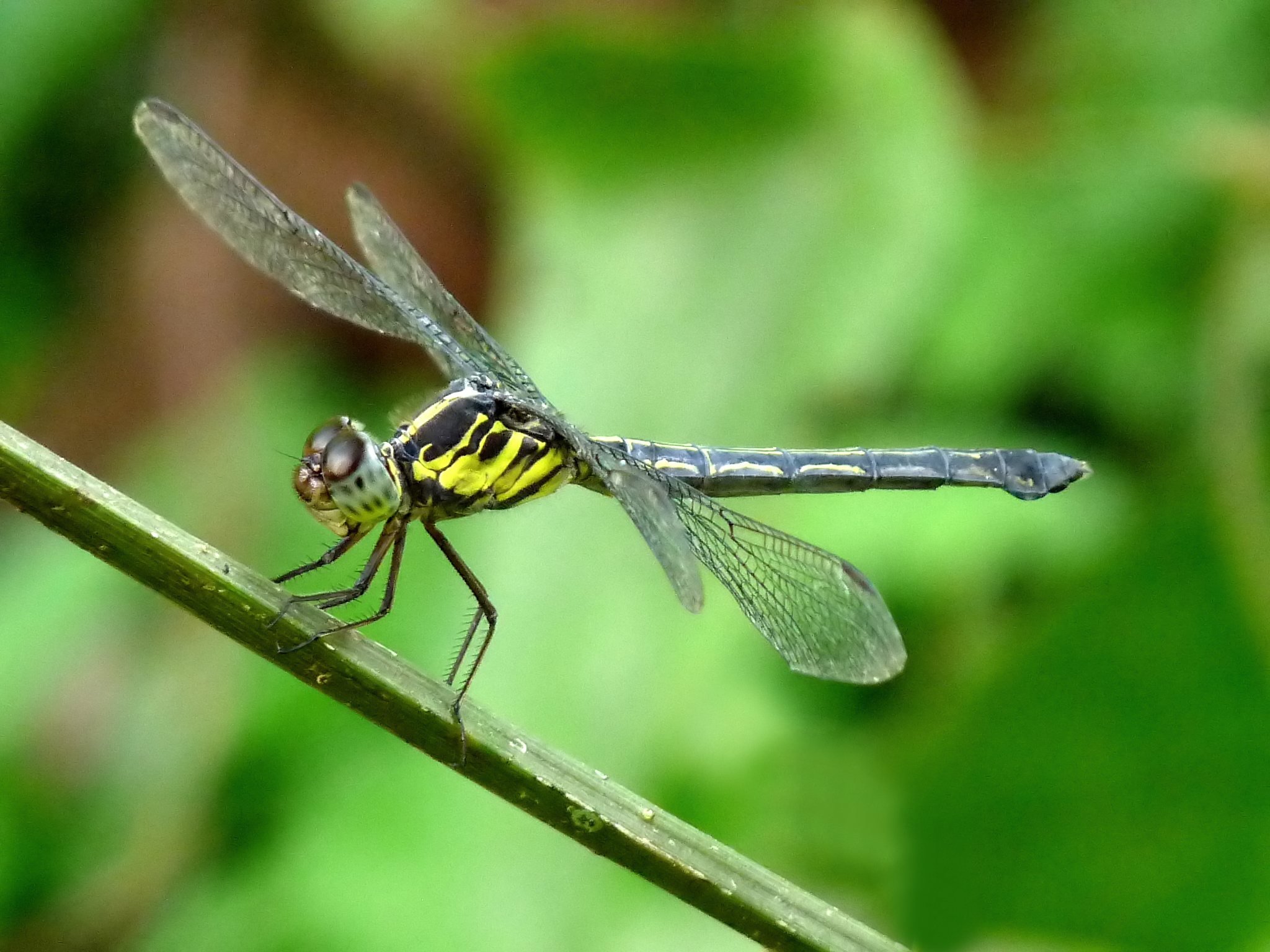
- Female

Conservation status
- Least Concern (IUCN 3.1)

Scientific classification
- Kingdom: Animalia
- Phylum: Arthropoda
- Class: Insecta
- Order: Odonata
- Infraorder: Anisoptera
- Family: Libellulidae
- Genus: Cratilla
- Species: C. lineata

Binomial name
- Cratilla lineata (Brauer, 1878)

Synonyms
- Cratilla calverti Förster, 1903

= Cratilla lineata =

Species of dragonfly

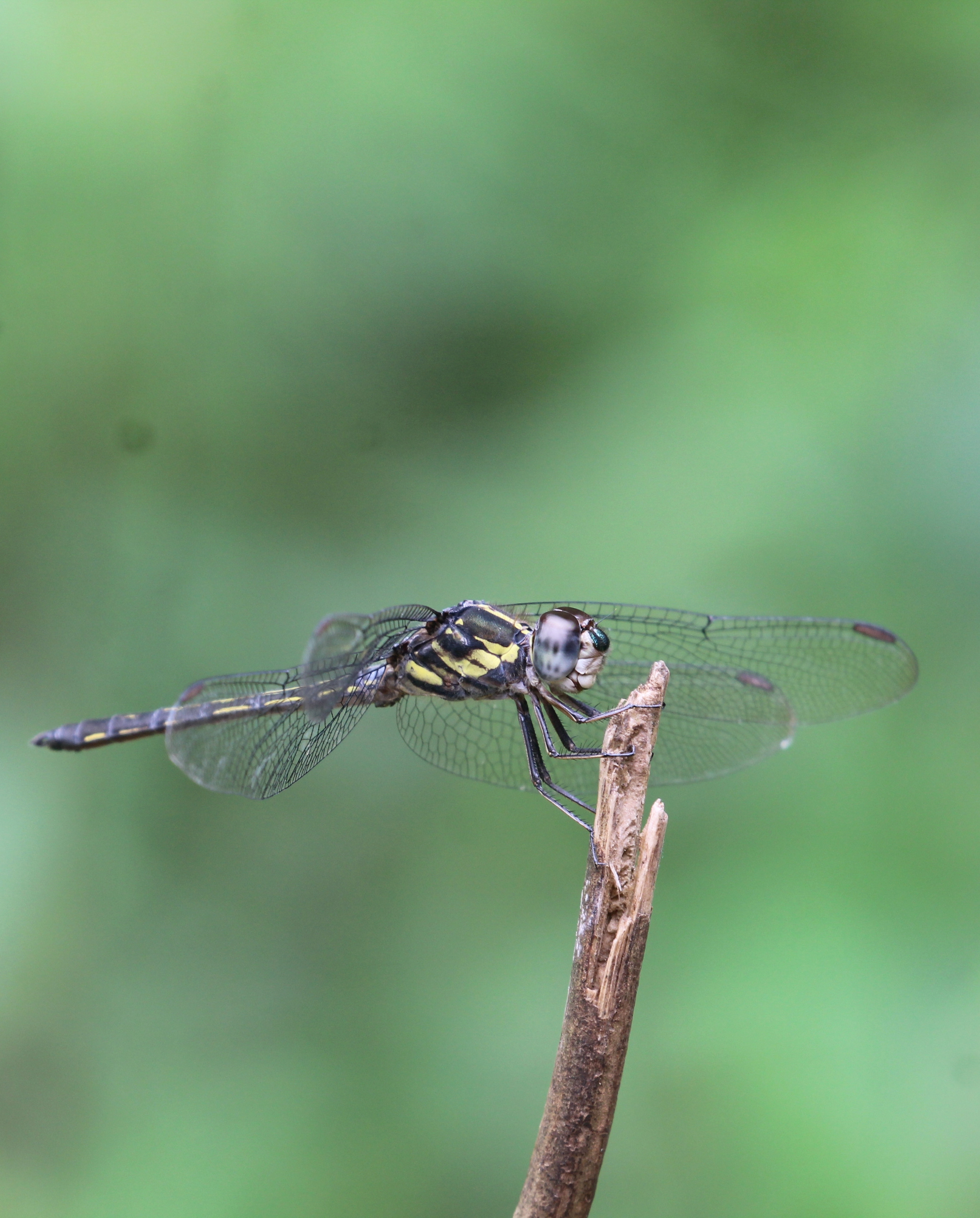
Cratilla lineata photo from wayanad Kerala

Cratilla lineata, the line forest-skimmer, emerald-banded skimmer or pale-faced forest-skimmer, is a species of dragonfly in the family Libellulidae. It is found in many Asian countries.

== Description and habitat ==
It is a medium-sized dragonfly with metallic-blue frons and brown-capped grey eyes. Its thorax is bronze-black, marked with yellow. There is a mid-dorsal carina, and an anterior and a posterior stripes narrowly separated and very irregular in shapes. There are four stripes on each side, the first and third rather broad, the others narrow. Abdomen is black, marked with bright ochreous-yellow. Segments 1 and 2 have moderately broad lateral and mid-dorsal stripes. Segments 3 to 8 have fine stripes bordering the ventral borders of segments and mid-dorsal carina. Arial appendages are black. Female is similar to the male.

It is commonly found in forested areas in lowland and montane regions. Prefers to breed in shaded muddy pools and marshes in forest.

== Subspecies ==
Three subspecies are recognized.

- Cratilla lineata assidua Lieftinck, 1953
- Cratilla lineata calverti Foerster, 1903
- Cratilla lineata lineata Brauer, 1878

== See also ==
- List of odonates of Sri Lanka
- List of odonates of India
- List of odonata of Kerala
