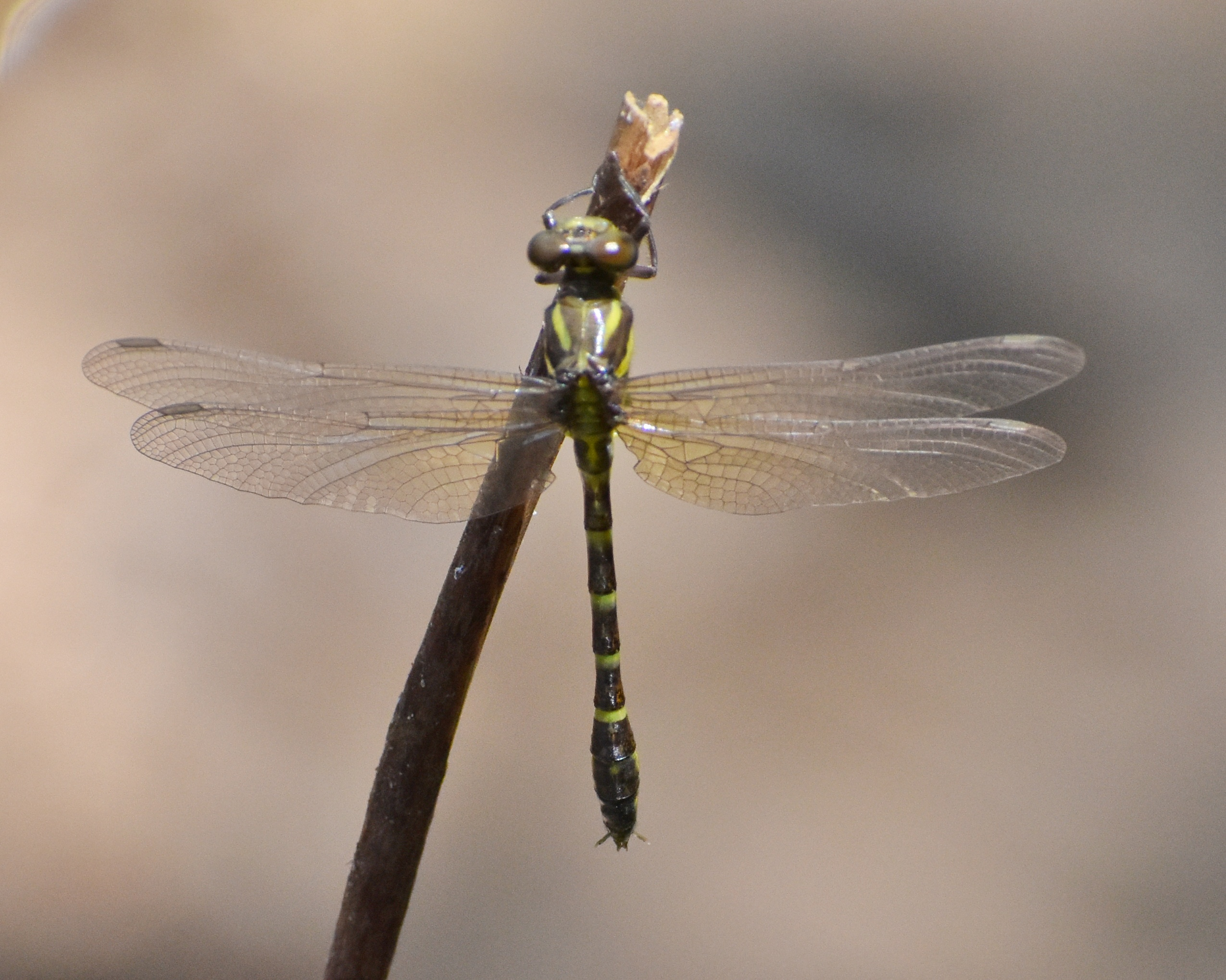
- Cyclogomphus flavoannulatus, male

Scientific classification
- Kingdom: Animalia
- Phylum: Arthropoda
- Class: Insecta
- Order: Odonata
- Infraorder: Anisoptera
- Family: Gomphidae
- Genus: Cyclogomphus; Selys, 1854

= Cyclogomphus =

Genus of dragonflies

Cyclogomphus is a genus of dragonfly in the family Gomphidae. It contains the following species:

- Cyclogomphus flavoannulatus Rangnekar, Dharwadkar, Sadasivan & Subramanian, 2019
- Cyclogomphus gynostylus Fraser, 1926
- Cyclogomphus heterostylus Selys, 1854
- Cyclogomphus wilkinsi Fraser, 1926
- Cyclogomphus ypsilon Selys, 1854
