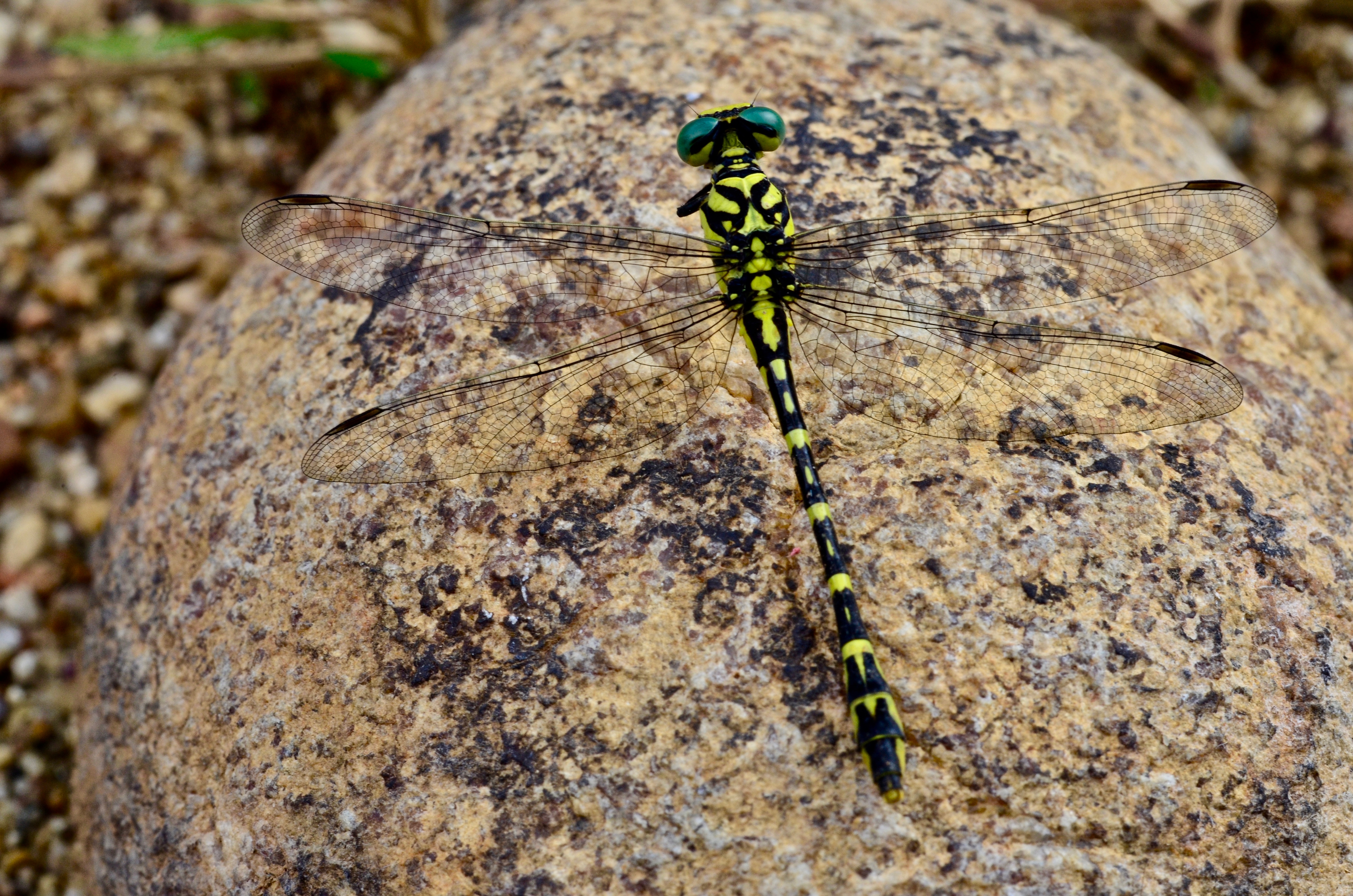
- Female

Conservation status
- Data Deficient (IUCN 3.1)

Scientific classification
- Kingdom: Animalia
- Phylum: Arthropoda
- Class: Insecta
- Order: Odonata
- Infraorder: Anisoptera
- Family: Gomphidae
- Genus: Cyclogomphus
- Species: C. heterostylus

Binomial name
- Cyclogomphus heterostylus Sélys, 1854

= Cyclogomphus heterostylus =

Species of dragonfly

Cyclogomphus heterostylus is a species of dragonfly in the family Gomphidae. It is known only parts of south and central India. It is found in marshlands along the rivers and lakes where it breeds. There is no other information regarding its habitat or ecology of this species available.

== See also ==
- List of odonates of India
- List of odonata of Kerala
