= Cyclogomphus gynostylus =

Conservation status
- Least Concern (IUCN 3.1)

Scientific classification
- Kingdom: Animalia
- Phylum: Arthropoda
- Class: Insecta
- Order: Odonata
- Infraorder: Anisoptera
- Family: Gomphidae
- Genus: Cyclogomphus
- Species: C. gynostylus

Binomial name
- Cyclogomphus gynostylus Fraser, 1926

Species of dragonfly

Cyclogomphus gynostylus is a species of dragonfly in the family Gomphidae. It is endemic to Sri Lanka. Its natural habitats are rivers, water storage areas, and canals and ditches. It is threatened by habitat loss.
