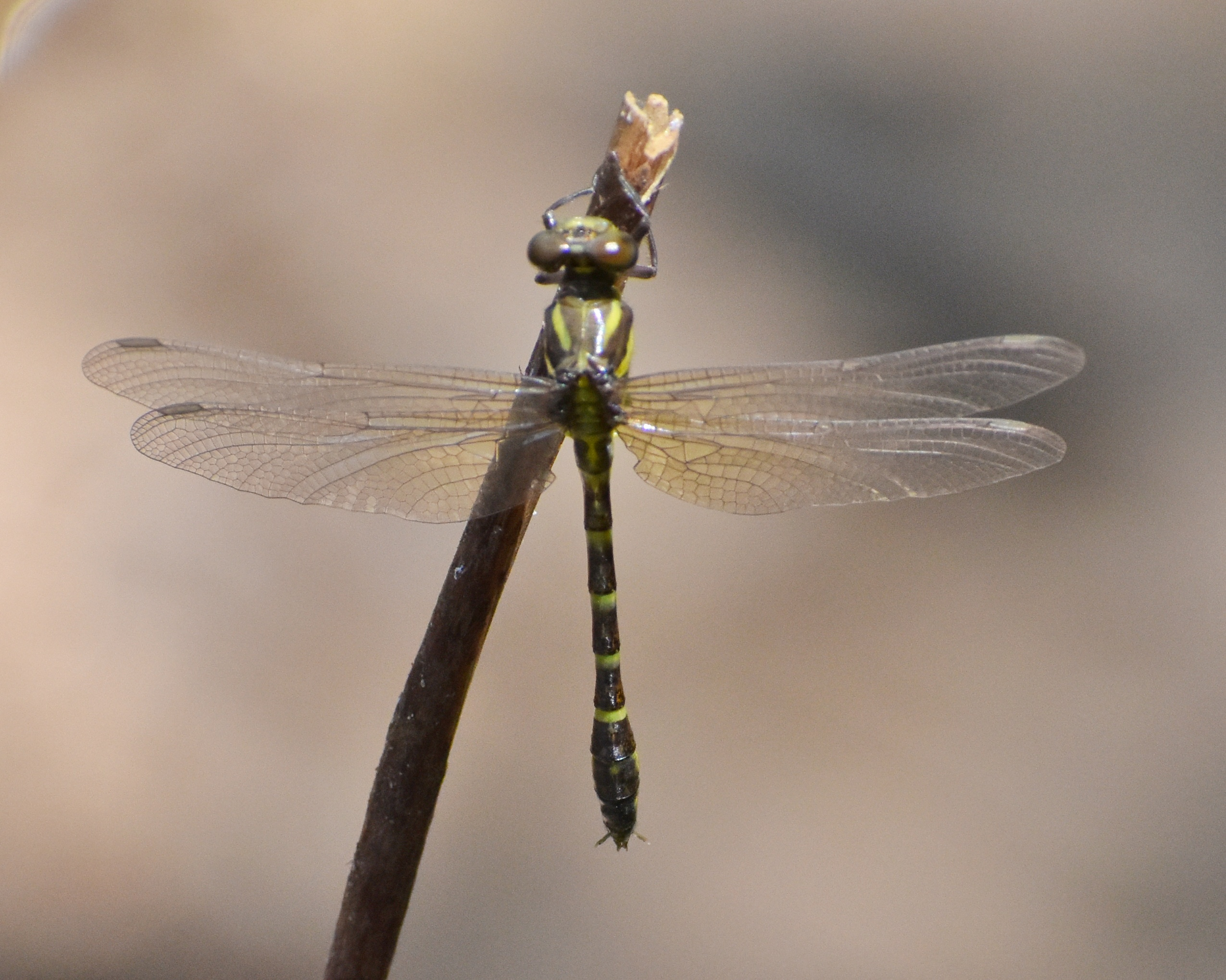
- Male
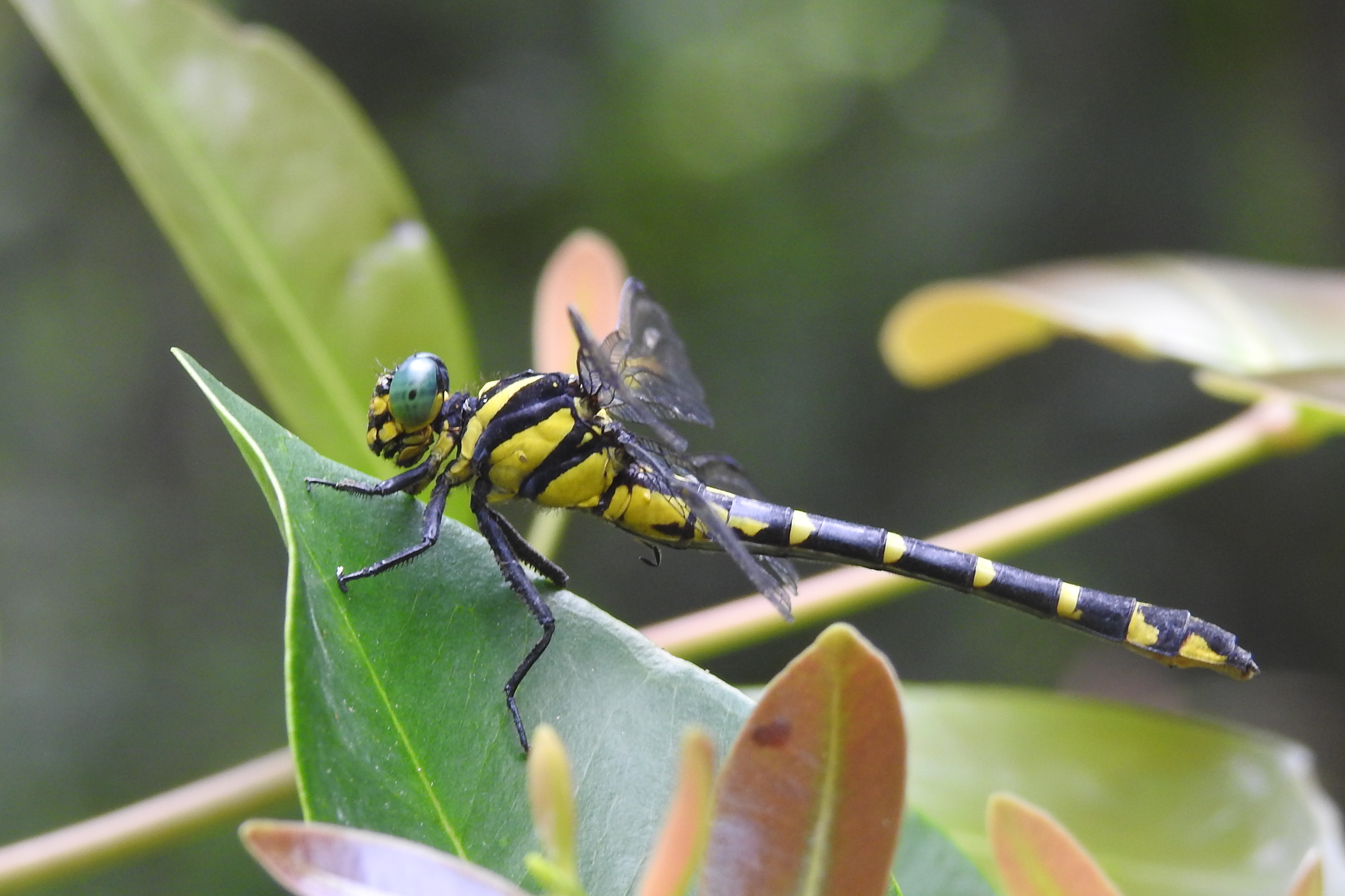
- Female

Scientific classification
- Domain: Eukaryota
- Kingdom: Animalia
- Phylum: Arthropoda
- Class: Insecta
- Order: Odonata
- Infraorder: Anisoptera
- Family: Gomphidae
- Genus: Cyclogomphus
- Species: C. flavoannulatus

Binomial name
- Cyclogomphus flavoannulatus Rangnekar, Dharwadkar, Sadasivan & Subramanian, 2019

= Cyclogomphus flavoannulatus =

Species of dragonfly

Cyclogomphus flavoannulatus is a species of dragonfly in the family Gomphidae. It is known only from the Western Ghats of India.

== See also ==
- List of odonates of India
- List of odonata of Kerala
