= List of damselflies of the world (Lestidae) =

- Archilestes californicus
- Archilestes exoletus
- Archilestes grandis
- Archilestes guayaraca
- Archilestes latialatus
- Archilestes neblina
- Archilestes regalis
- Archilestes tuberalatus
- Austrolestes aleison
- Austrolestes analis
- Austrolestes annulosus
- Austrolestes aridus
- Austrolestes cingulatus
- Austrolestes colensonis
- Austrolestes io
- Austrolestes leda
- Austrolestes minjerriba
- Austrolestes psyche
- Chalcolestes parvidens
- Chalcolestes viridis
- Indolestes albicaudus
- Indolestes alfurus
- Indolestes alleni
- Indolestes anomalus
- Indolestes aruanus
- Indolestes assamicus
- Indolestes bellax
- Indolestes bilineatus
- Indolestes birmanus
- Indolestes boninensis
- Indolestes cheesmanae
- Indolestes coeruleus
- Indolestes cyaneus
- Indolestes dajakanus
- Indolestes davenporti
- Indolestes divisus
- Indolestes extraneus
- Indolestes floresianus
- Indolestes goniocercus
- Indolestes gracilis
- Indolestes indicus
- Indolestes inflatus
- Indolestes insularis
- Indolestes linsleyi
- Indolestes lundquisti
- Indolestes luxatus
- Indolestes lygisticercus
- Indolestes obiri
- Indolestes peregrinus
- Indolestes pulcherrimus
- Indolestes risi
- Indolestes sutteri
- Indolestes tenuissimus
- Indolestes vitiensis
- Lestes alacer
- Lestes alfonsoi
- Lestes amicus
- Lestes angularis
- Lestes apollinaris
- Lestes auripennis
- Lestes auritus
- Lestes australis
- Lestes barbatus
- Lestes basidens
- Lestes bipupillatus
- Lestes concinnus
- Lestes congener
- Lestes curvatus
- Lestes debellardi
- Lestes dichrostigma
- Lestes disjunctus
- Lestes dissimulans
- Lestes dorothea
- Lestes dryas
- Lestes elatus
- Lestes eurinus
- Lestes falcifer
- Lestes fernandoi
- Lestes forcipatus
- Lestes forficula
- Lestes garoensis
- Lestes helix
- Lestes henshawi
- Lestes ictericus
- Lestes inaequalis
- Lestes japonicus
- Lestes jerrelli
- Lestes jurzitzai
- Lestes macrostigma
- Lestes malabaricus
- Lestes malaisei
- Lestes minutus
- Lestes nigriceps
- Lestes nodalis
- Lestes numidicus
- Lestes ochraceus
- Lestes orientalis
- Lestes pallidus
- Lestes patricia
- Lestes paulistus
- Lestes pictus
- Lestes pinheyi
- Lestes plagiatus
- Lestes praevius
- Lestes pruinescens
- Lestes quadristriatus
- Lestes rectangularis
- Lestes regulatus
- Lestes scalaris
- Lestes secula
- Lestes sigma
- Lestes silvaticus
- Lestes simplex
- Lestes simuulans
- Lestes simulatrix
- Lestes spatula
- Lestes sponsa
- Lestes spumarius
- Lestes sternalis
- Lestes stultus
- Lestes sutteri
- Lestes tarryi
- Lestes temporalis
- Lestes tenuatus
- Lestes thoracicus
- Lestes tikalus
- Lestes trichonus
- Lestes tricolor
- Lestes tridens
- Lestes umbrinus
- Lestes uncifer
- Lestes undulatus
- Lestes unguiculatus
- Lestes urubamba
- Lestes vidua
- Lestes vigilax
- Lestes virens
- Lestes virgatus
- Lestes viridulus
- Orolestes durga
- Orolestes motis
- Orolestes octomaculatus
- Orolestes selysi
- Orolestes wallacei
- Platylestes heterostylus
- Platylestes pertinax
- Platylestes platystylus
- Platylestes praecellens
- Platylestes praemorsus
- Platylestes quercifolius
- Sinhalestes orientalis
- Sympecma fusca
- Sympecma gobica
- Sympecma paedisca
