= Common spreadwing =

Common Spreadwing may refer to:

- Lestes sponsa in Europe
- Lestes plagiatus in Africa
- Lestes disjunctus in North America
