= Spotted spreadwing =

Spotted spreadwing may refer to:

- Lestes tridens in Africa
- Lestes congener in North America
