= Emerald Spreadwing =

The common name emerald spreadwing is used for several species of damselflies in the family Lestidae:

- Lestes dryas
- Lestes viridulus
