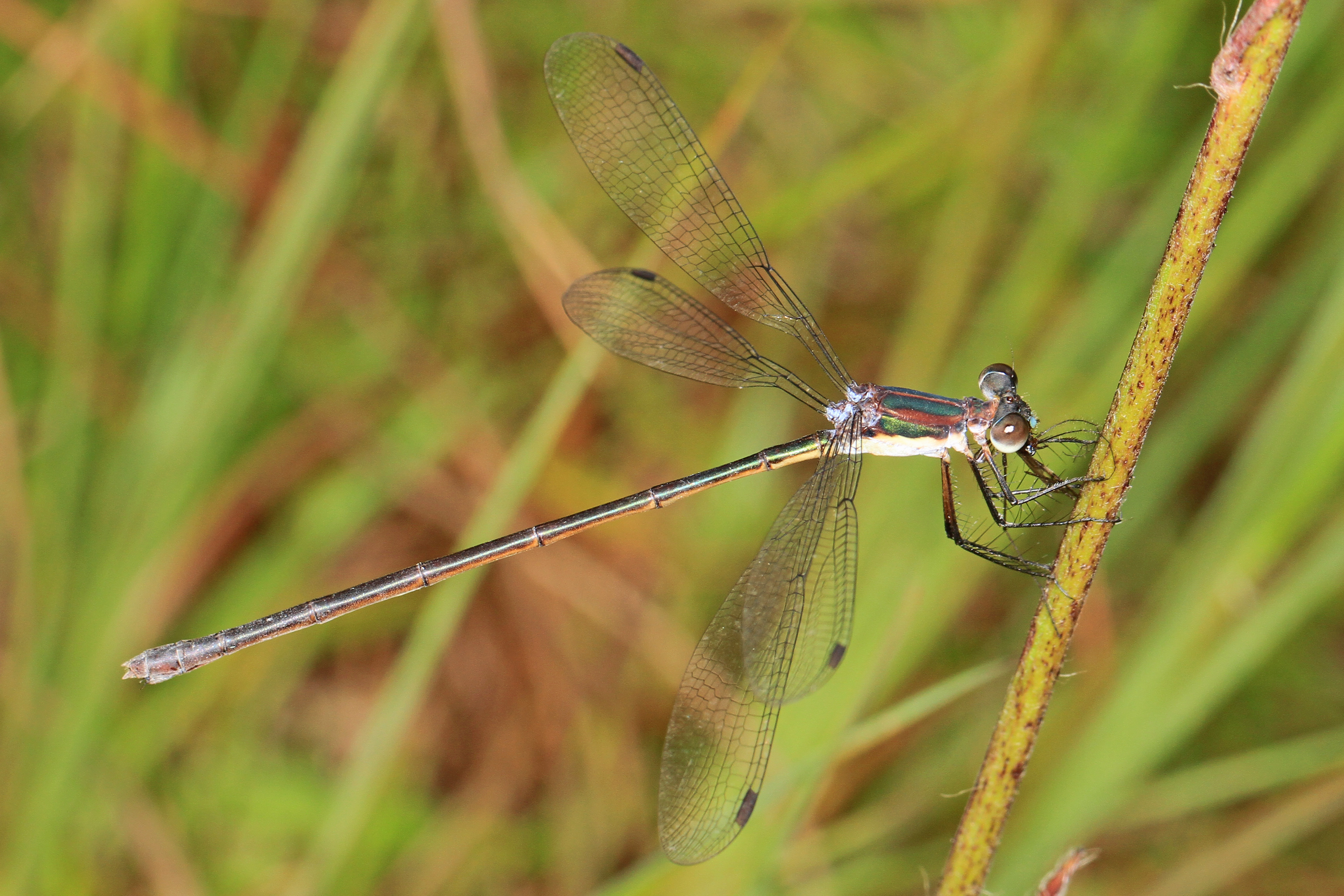

Conservation status
- Secure (NatureServe)

Scientific classification
- Kingdom: Animalia
- Phylum: Arthropoda
- Clade: Pancrustacea
- Class: Insecta
- Order: Odonata
- Suborder: Zygoptera
- Family: Lestidae
- Genus: Lestes
- Species: L. inaequalis

Binomial name
- Lestes inaequalis Walsh, 1862

Synonyms
- Lestes virgo Calvert, 1897

= Elegant spreadwing =

Species of damselfly

The elegant spreadwing (Lestes inaequalis) is a species of damselfly in the family Lestidae, the spreadwings. It is native to eastern North America, including eastern Canada and the United States.

== Description ==
This species is 45 to 60 millimeters long. The male has a metallic green and yellow thorax and a blue-tipped green abdomen. The body is pruinose, especially in older specimens. The female has a thicker body with duller coloration. This species is similar to the swamp spreadwing (L. vigilax) but larger in size, and to the amber-winged spreadwing (L. eurinus) but without the amber wings.

== Biology ==
This species lives near freshwater bodies such as streams, lakes, ponds, and marshes. It may live under the canopy in wooded areas.

The elegant spreadwing is known to feed on smaller damselflies.

== References====External links ==
- Media related to Lestes inaequalis at Wikimedia Commons
- Data related to Elegant spreadwing at Wikispecies
