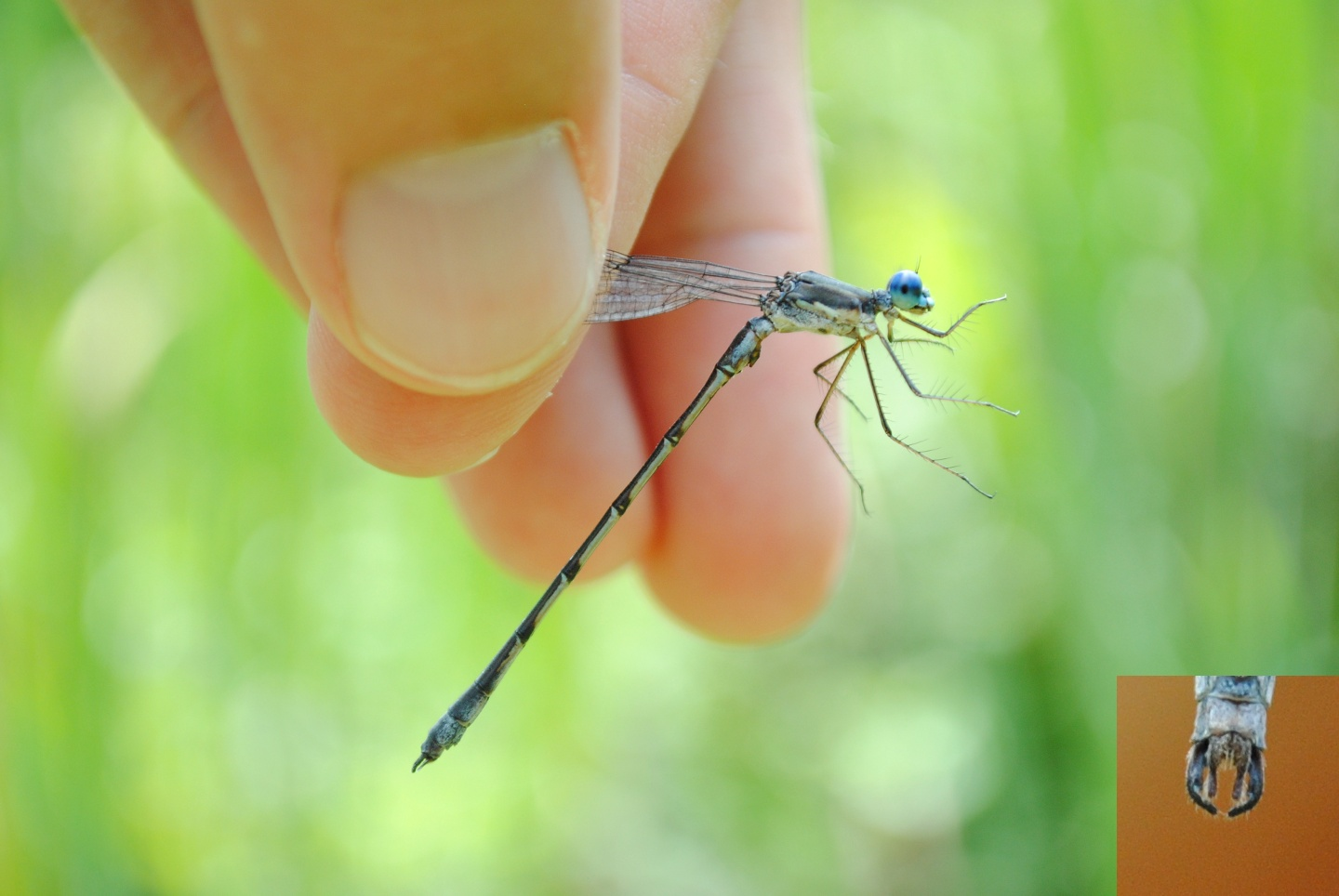

Conservation status
- Secure (NatureServe)

Scientific classification
- Kingdom: Animalia
- Phylum: Arthropoda
- Clade: Pancrustacea
- Class: Insecta
- Order: Odonata
- Suborder: Zygoptera
- Family: Lestidae
- Genus: Lestes
- Species: L. forcipatus

Binomial name
- Lestes forcipatus Rambur, 1842

= Sweetflag spreadwing =

Species of damselfly

The sweetflag spreadwing (Lestes forcipatus) is a species of damselfly in the family Lestidae, the spreadwings. It is native to North America, especially eastern parts of Canada and the United States.

== Identification ==
This is a medium-sized spreadwing, measuring about 38 to 50 millimeters in length. The male has a dark or black thorax with tan or bluish sides and with pale stripes across the shoulders. The abdomen is dark with a light gray tip. The body is pruinescent, especially in older specimens. The female is thicker in build with a dark to black body. Both sexes may have a light brown spot on the underside of the thorax.

This species is difficult to distinguish from the common spreadwing (L. disjunctus).

== Biology ==
This species lives near ponds, marshes, and slow-running streams.
