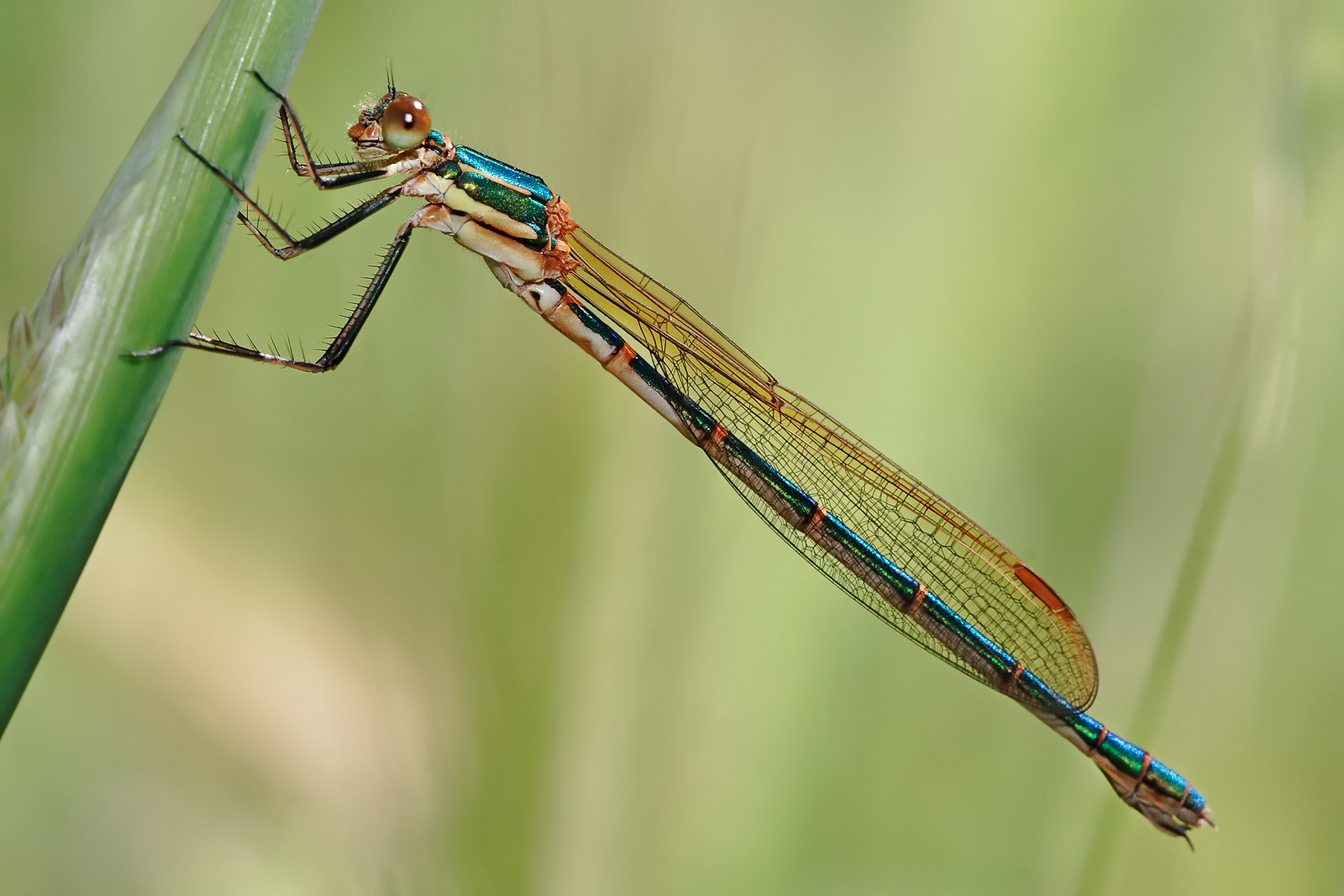
- Female Austrolestes cingulatus

Scientific classification
- Kingdom: Animalia
- Phylum: Arthropoda
- Clade: Pancrustacea
- Class: Insecta
- Order: Odonata
- Suborder: Zygoptera
- Superfamily: Lestoidea
- Family: Lestidae; Calvert, 1901

Type genus
- Lestes
- Distribution of Lestidae

= Lestidae =

Lestidae Temporal range: Late Eocene–present

Family of damselflies

Lestidae is a family of cosmopolitan, medium-sized to large, slender damselflies, known commonly as the spreadwings, spread-winged damselflies, or reedlings.

Fossil lestids are known from the Late Eocene onwards.

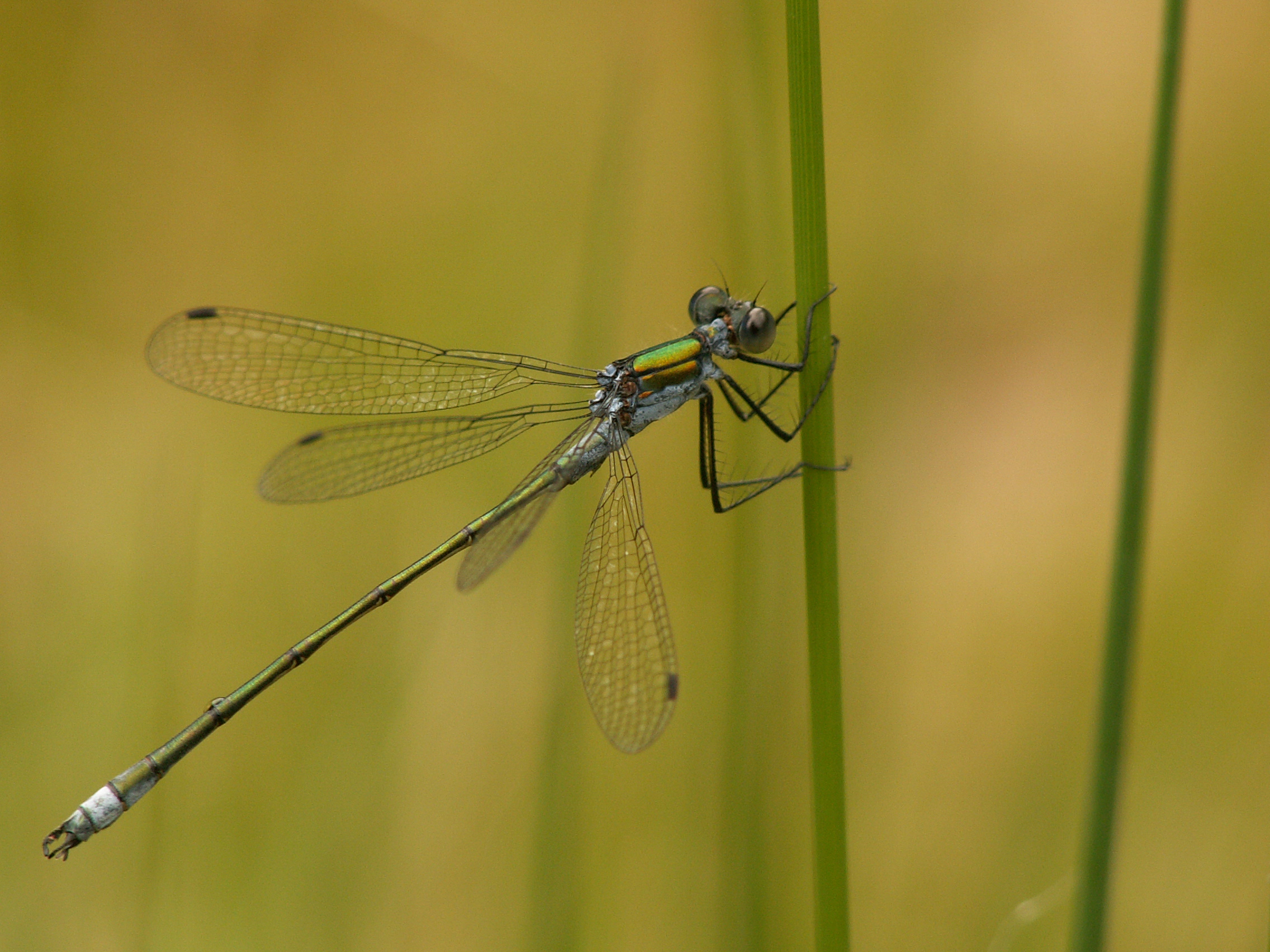
A male Lestes dryas in the "spread-winged" posture that gives the family its common name

== Characteristics ==
While most damselflies rest with their wings folded together, most members of the family Lestidae hold them at an angle away from their bodies. The pterostigma (a single dark spot in the meshwork of the leading edge near the tip of each wing) is noticeably elongated. The quadrilateral (a part of the wing venation, close to the body) has an acute angle at the end. The body has a greenish, metallic shine. The superior anal appendages, commonly called claspers (body parts of male insect for clasping the female during copulation) of male spreadwings are long and strongly curved.

Breeding takes place in slow-moving or still water in stream backwaters, swamps, marshes and temporary pools. The nymphs have a long abdomen and a distinctive prementum (part of the lower lip). There is one generation per year in North American species.

== Taxonomic history ==
Before Lestidae was recognised as a family, its genera were placed in the damselfly subfamily Agrioninae. In 1862, Selys treated Lestes as the second “legion” of Agrioninae. Calvert later used the subfamily name Lestinae for several genera in that group; the family name Lestidae is based on it.

== Classification ==
The two subfamilies in Lestidae are Lestinae and Sympecmatinae. Damselflies in the Lestinae rest with their wings partly open, while those in the Sympecmatinae, the reedlings, ringtails, and winter damselflies, rest with their wings folded. In the past, taxonomy of the family has been disputed, with some authorities including twelve genera while others included eight genera. Current authorities accept nine genera make up the family Lestidae.

SubFamily	Image	Genus	Extant species
Sympecmatinae Fraser, 1951		Archilestes Selys, 1862	Archilestes exoletus (Hagen in Selys, 1862); Archilestes grandis (Rambur, 1942) - Great Spreadwing; Archilestes guayaraca De Marmels, 1982; Archilestes latialatus Donnelly, 1981; Archilestes neblina Garrison, 1982; Archilestes regalis Gloyd, 1944; Archilestes tuberalatus (Williamson, 1921)
Sympecmatinae Fraser, 1951		Indolestes Fraser, 1922	Indolestes albicaudus (McLachlan, 1895); Indolestes alfurus Lieftinck, 1960; Indolestes alleni (Tillyard, 1913) - Small Reedling; Indolestes anomalus Fraser, 1946; Indolestes aruanus Lieftinck, 1951; Indolestes assamicus Fraser, 1930; Indolestes bellax (Lieftinck, 1930); Indolestes bilineatus (Selys, 1891); Indolestes birmanus (Selys, 1891); Indolestes boninensis (Asahina, 1952); Indolestes cheesmanae Kimmins, 1936; Indolestes coeruleus Fraser, 1924; Indolestes cyaneus (Selys, 1862); Indolestes dajakanus (Lieftinck, 1948); Indolestes davenporti (Fraser, 1930); Indolestes divisus (Hagen in Selys, 1862); Indolestes extraneus (Needham, 1930); Indolestes floresianus Lieftinck, 1960; Indolestes goniocercus Lieftinck, 1960; Indolestes gracilis (Hagen in Selys, 1862); Indolestes guizhouensis Zhou & Zhou, 2005; Indolestes indicus Fraser, 1922; Indolestes inflatus (Fraser, 1933); Indolestes insularis (Tillyard, 1913) - Northern ringtail; Indolestes linsleyi Lieftinck, 1960; Indolestes lundquisti (Lieftinck, 1949); Indolestes luxatus (Lieftinck, 1932); Indolestes lygisticercus (Lieftinck, 1932); Indolestes obiri Watson, 1979 - Cave Reedling; Indolestes peregrinus (Ris, 1916); Indolestes pulcherrimus Fraser, 1924; Indolestes risi (Van der Weele, 1909); Indolestes sutteri Lieftinck, 1953; Indolestes tenuissimus Tillyard, 1906 - Slender Reedling; Indolestes vitiensis (Tillyard, 1924)
Sympecmatinae Fraser, 1951		Sympecma Burmeister, 1839	Sympecma fusca (Vander Linden, 1820) – Common Winter Damselfly; Sympecma gobica Förster, 1900; Sympecma paedisca (Brauer, 1877) – Siberian Winter Damsel
Lestinae Calvert 1901		Austrolestes Tillyard, 1913	Austrolestes aleison Watson & Moulds, 1979 - Western ringtail; Austrolestes analis (Rambur, 1842) - Slender ringtail; Austrolestes annulosus (Selys, 1862) - Blue ringtail; Austrolestes aridus (Tillyard, 1908) - Inland ringtail; Austrolestes cingulatus (Burmeister, 1839) - Metallic ringtail; Austrolestes colensonis (White, 1846) - Blue damselfly, kekewai; Austrolestes io (Selys, 1862) - Iota ringtail; Austrolestes leda (Selys, 1862) - Wandering ringtail; Austrolestes minjerriba Watson, 1979 - Dune ringtail; Austrolestes psyche (Hagen in Selys, 1862) - Cup ringtail
Lestinae Calvert 1901		Chalcolestes Kennedy, 1920	Chalcolestes parvidens (Artobolevsky, 1929) – Eastern Willow Spreadwing; Chalcolestes viridis (Vander Linden, 1825) – Willow Emerald Damselfly,
Lestinae Calvert 1901		Lestes Leach, 1815	Lestes alacer Hagen, 1861 – Plateau Spreadwing; Lestes alfonsoi González & Novelo, 2001; Lestes amicus Martin, 1910; Lestes angularis Fraser, 1929; Lestes apollinaris Navás, 1934; Lestes auripennis Fraser, 1955; Lestes auritus Hagen in Selys, 1862; Lestes australis Walker, 1952 – Southern Spreadwing; Lestes barbarus (Fabricius, 1798) – Southern Emerald Damselfly, Migrant Spreadwing; Lestes basidens Belle, 1997; Lestes bipupillatus Calvert, 1909; Lestes concinnus Hagen in Selys, 1862; Lestes congener Hagen, 1861 – Spotted Spreadwing; Lestes curvatus Belle, 1997; Lestes debellardi De Marmels, 1992; Lestes dichrostigma Calvert, 1909; Lestes disjunctus Selys, 1862 – Northern Spreadwing; Lestes dissimulans Fraser, 1955; Lestes dorothea Fraser, 1924; Lestes dryas Kirby, 1890 – Emerald Spreadwing, Scarce Emerald Damselfly, Lestes elatus Hagen in Selys, 1862; Lestes eurinus Say, 1839 – Amber-winged Spreadwing; Lestes falcifer Sjöstedt, 1918; Lestes fernandoi Costa, De Souza & Muzón, 2006; Lestes forcipatus Rambur, 1842 – Sweetflag Spreadwing; Lestes forficula Rambur, 1842 – Rainpool Spreadwing; Lestes garoensis Lahiri, 1987; Lestes helix Ris, 1918; Lestes henshawi Calvert, 1907; Lestes ictericus Gerstäcker, 1869; Lestes inaequalis Walsh, 1862 – Elegant Spreadwing; Lestes japonicus Selys, 1883; Lestes jerrelli Tennessen, 1997; Lestes jurzitzai Muzon, 1994; Lestes macrostigma (Eversmann, 1836) – Dark Emerald Damselfly; Lestes malabaricus Fraser, 1929; Lestes malaisei Schmidt, 1964; Lestes minutus Selys, 1862; Lestes nigriceps Fraser, 1924; Lestes nodalis Selys, 1891; Lestes numidicus Samraoui, Weekers & Dumont, 2003; Lestes ochraceus Selys, 1862; Lestes pallidus Rambur, 1842; Lestes patricia Fraser, 1924; Lestes paulistus Calvert, 1909; Lestes pictus Hagen in Selys, 1862; Lestes pinheyi Fraser, 1955; Lestes plagiatus (Burmeister, 1839); Lestes praecellens Lieftinck, 1937; Lestes praemorsus Hagen in Selys, 1862; Lestes praevius Lieftinck, 1940; Lestes pruinescens Martin, 1910; Lestes quadristriatus Calvert, 1909; Lestes rectangularis Say, 1839 – Slender Spreadwing; Lestes regulatus Martin, 1910; Lestes scalaris Gundlach, 1888; Lestes secula May, 1993; Lestes sigma Calvert, 1901 – Chalky Spreadwing; Lestes silvaticus Schmidt, 1951; Lestes simplex Hagen, 1861; Lestes simulatrix McLachlan, 1895; Lestes spatula Fraser, 1946; Lestes sponsa (Hansemann, 1823) – Emerald Damselfly, Lestes spumarius Hagen in Selys, 1862 – Antillean Spreadwing; Lestes sternalis Navás, 1930; Lestes stultus Hagen, 1861 – Black Spreadwing; Lestes temporalis Selys, 1883; Lestes tenuatus Rambur, 1842 – Blue-striped Spreadwing; Lestes thoracicus Laidlaw, 1920; Lestes tikalus Kormoondy, 1959; Lestes trichonus Belle, 1997; Lestes tricolor Erichson, 1848; Lestes tridens McLachlan, 1895; Lestes umbrinus Selys, 1891; Lestes uncifer Karsch, 1899; Lestes undulatus Say, 1840; Lestes unguiculatus Hagen, 1861 – Lyre-tipped Spreadwing; Lestes urubamba Kennedy, 1942; Lestes vidua Hagen, 1861 – Carolina Spreadwing; Lestes vigilax Hagen in Selys, 1862 – Swamp Spreadwing; Lestes virens (Charpentier, 1825) – Small Emerald Damselfly, Lestes virgatus (Burmeister, 1839); Lestes viridulus Rambur, 1842
Lestinae Calvert 1901		Orolestes McLachlan, 1895	Orolestes durga Lahiri, 1987; Orolestes excelsus Fraser, 1933; Orolestes motis Baijal & Agarwal, 1956; Orolestes octomaculatus Martin, 1904; Orolestes selysi McLachlan, 1895; Orolestes wallacei (Kirby, 1889)
Lestinae Calvert 1901		Platylestes Selys, 1862	Platylestes heterostylus Lieftinck, 1932; Platylestes kirani Emiliyamma, Palot & Charesh, 2020; Platylestes pertinax Lieftinck, 1932; Platylestes platystyla Rambur, 1842; Platylestes platystylus (Rambur, 1842)
Lestinae Calvert 1901		Sinhalestes Fraser, 1951	Sinhalestes orientalis (Hagen, 1862)

== Etymology ==
The family name Lestidae is derived from the type genus Lestes, with the standard zoological suffix -idae used for animal families.

The genus name Lestes is derived from the Greek λῃστής (lēstēs, "robber" or "pirate"), likely referring to the predatory behaviour of species in this genus.

== See also ==
- List of damselflies of the world (Lestidae)
