= Lestes praecellens =

Scientific classification
- Kingdom: Animalia
- Phylum: Arthropoda
- Clade: Pancrustacea
- Class: Insecta
- Order: Odonata
- Suborder: Zygoptera
- Family: Lestidae
- Genus: Lestes
- Species: L. praecellens

Binomial name
- Lestes praecellens Lieftinck, 1937

Species of damselfly

Lestes praecellens is a species of spreadwing in the damselfly family Lestidae.
