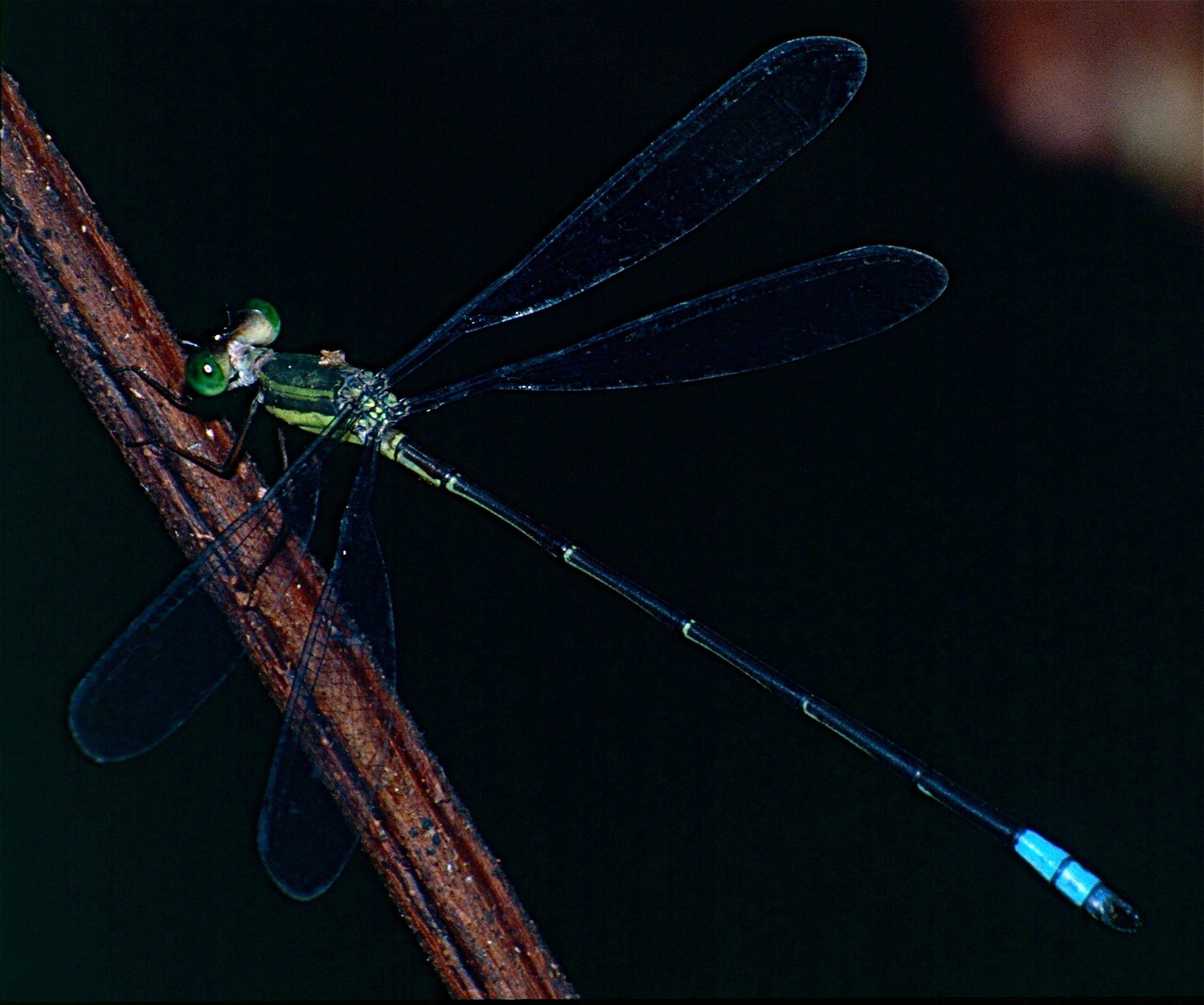
- Orolestes wallacei

Scientific classification
- Kingdom: Animalia
- Phylum: Arthropoda
- Class: Insecta
- Order: Odonata
- Suborder: Zygoptera
- Family: Lestidae
- Genus: Orolestes; McLachlan, 1895

= Orolestes =

Genus of damselflies

Orolestes is a genus of stalk-winged damselflies in the family Lestidae. There are about seven described species in Orolestes.

== Species ==
These seven species belong to the genus Orolestes:

Male	Female	Scientific name	Common name	Distribution
		Orolestes durga Lahiri, 1987		India
		Orolestes excelsus Fraser, 1933		Thailand
		Orolestes motis Baijal & Agarwal, 1956		India
		Orolestes octomaculatus Martin, 1904		Thailand, Vietnam, Cambodia, Laos, Malaysia
		Orolestes selysi McLachlan, 1895		Thailand, Taiwan, Vietnam, China
		Orolestes wallacei (Kirby, 1889)		Malaysia
