= Lestes undulatus =

- Lestes undulatus male in Argentina
- Lestes undulatus female in Argentina

Conservation status
- Least Concern (IUCN 3.1)

Scientific classification
- Kingdom: Animalia
- Phylum: Arthropoda
- Clade: Pancrustacea
- Class: Insecta
- Order: Odonata
- Suborder: Zygoptera
- Family: Lestidae
- Genus: Lestes
- Species: L. undulatus

Binomial name
- Lestes undulatus Say, 1840

Species of damselfly

Lestes undulatus is a species of spreadwing in the damselfly family Lestidae. It is found in South America.

The IUCN conservation status of Lestes undulatus is "LC", least concern, with no immediate threat to the species' survival. The IUCN status was reviewed in 2009.
