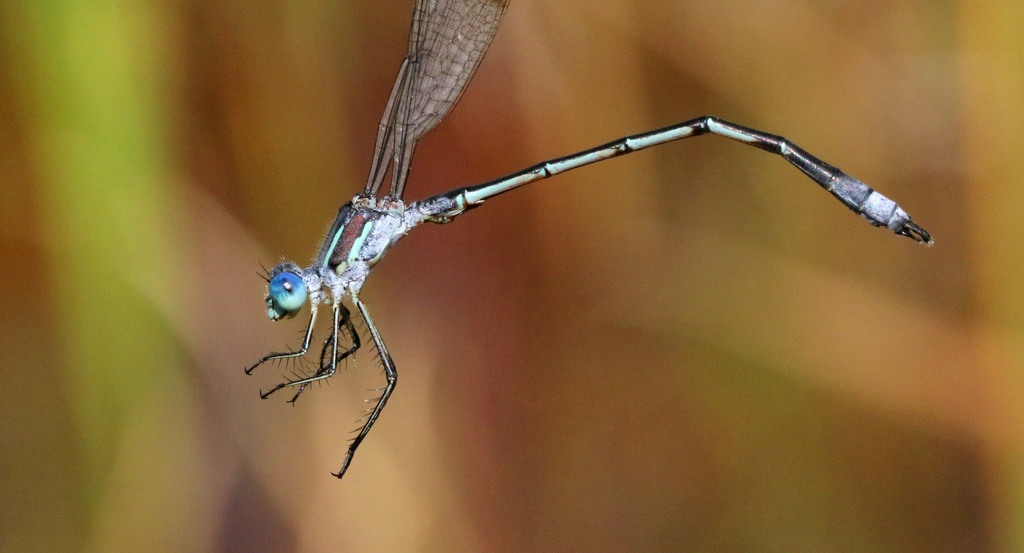

Conservation status
- Least Concern (IUCN 3.1)

Scientific classification
- Kingdom: Animalia
- Phylum: Arthropoda
- Class: Insecta
- Order: Odonata
- Suborder: Zygoptera
- Family: Lestidae
- Genus: Lestes
- Species: L. unguiculatus

Binomial name
- Lestes unguiculatus Hagen, 1861

= Lestes unguiculatus =

Species of damselfly

Lestes unguiculatus, the lyre-tipped spreadwing, is a species of spreadwing in the damselfly family Lestidae. It is found in North America.

The IUCN conservation status of Lestes unguiculatus is "LC", least concern, with no immediate threat to the species' survival. The population is stable. The IUCN status was reviewed in 2017.

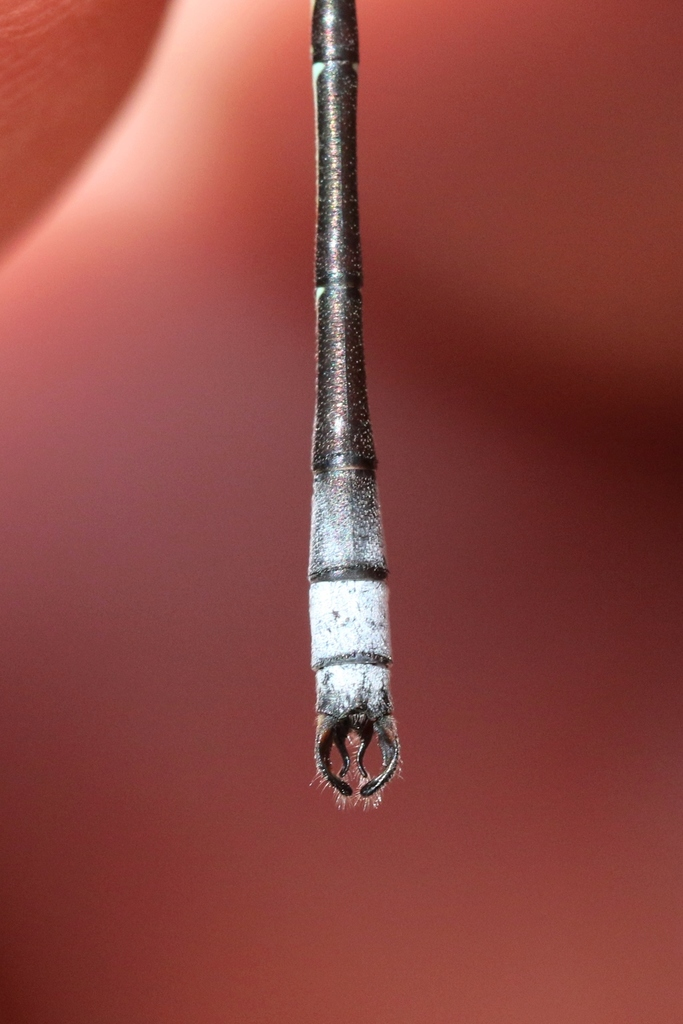
male claspers, showing "lyre" shape
