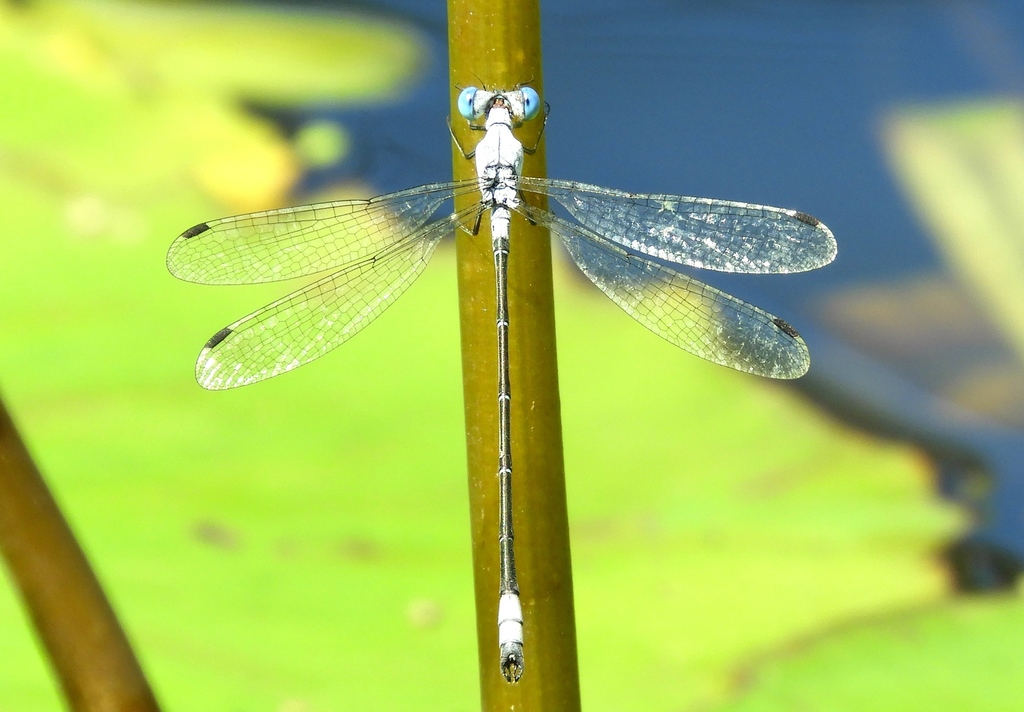

Conservation status
- Least Concern (IUCN 3.1)

Scientific classification
- Kingdom: Animalia
- Phylum: Arthropoda
- Class: Insecta
- Order: Odonata
- Suborder: Zygoptera
- Family: Lestidae
- Genus: Lestes
- Species: L. sigma

Binomial name
- Lestes sigma Calvert, 1901

= Lestes sigma =

Species of damselfly

Lestes sigma, the chalky spreadwing, is a species of spreadwing in the damselfly family Lestidae. It is found in Central America and North America.

The IUCN conservation status of Lestes sigma is "LC", least concern, with no immediate threat to the species' survival. The population is stable. The IUCN status was reviewed in 2017.
