= Lestes tikalus =

Conservation status
- Least Concern (IUCN 3.1)

Scientific classification
- Kingdom: Animalia
- Phylum: Arthropoda
- Class: Insecta
- Order: Odonata
- Suborder: Zygoptera
- Family: Lestidae
- Genus: Lestes
- Species: L. tikalus

Binomial name
- Lestes tikalus Kormoondy, 1959

Species of damselfly

Lestes tikalus is a species of spreadwing in the damselfly family Lestidae. It is found in Central America.

The IUCN conservation status of Lestes tikalus is "LC", least concern, with no immediate threat to the species' survival. The population is stable. The IUCN status was reviewed in 2009.
