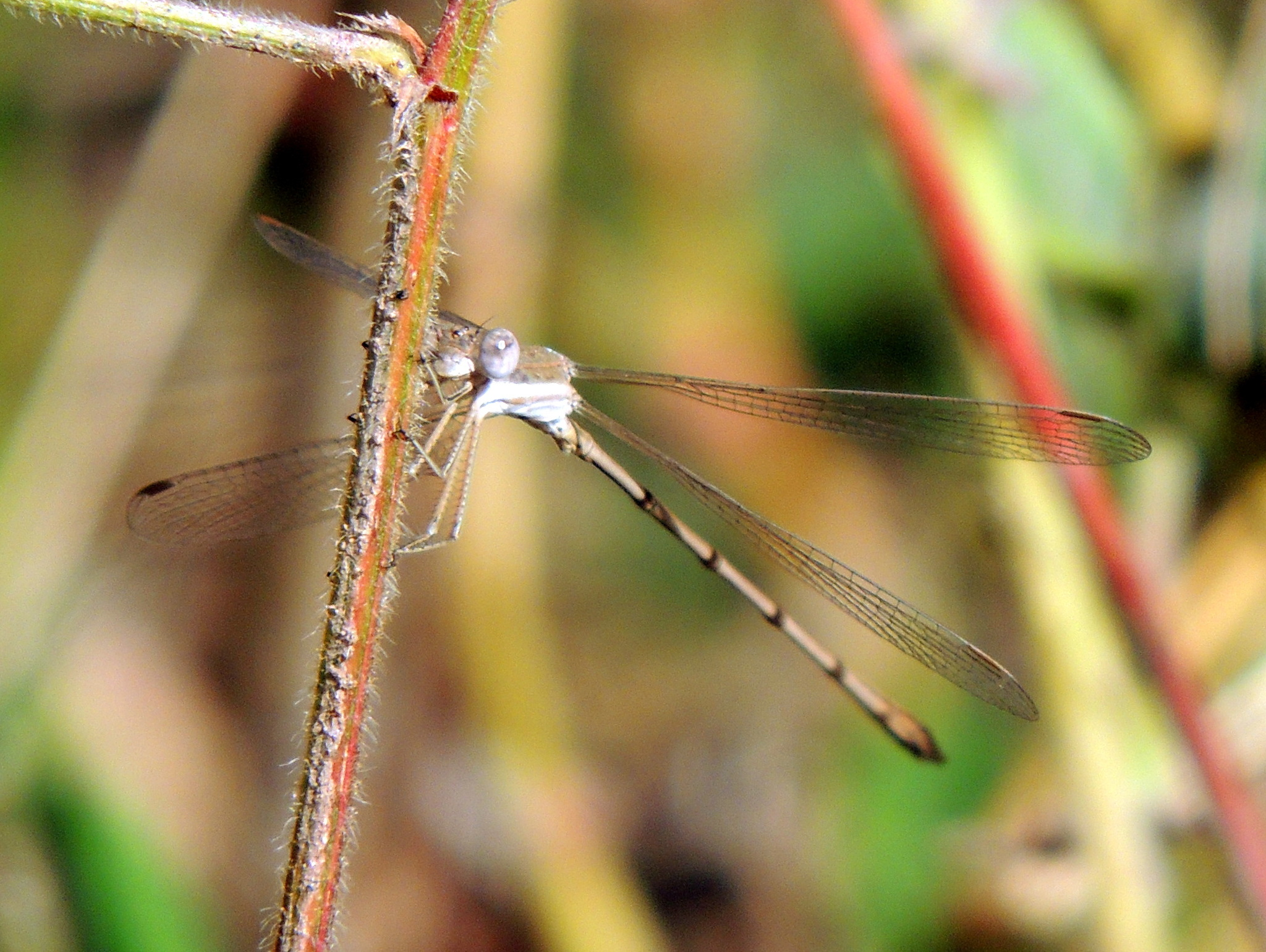

Conservation status
- Least Concern (IUCN 3.1)

Scientific classification
- Kingdom: Animalia
- Phylum: Arthropoda
- Class: Insecta
- Order: Odonata
- Suborder: Zygoptera
- Family: Lestidae
- Genus: Lestes
- Species: L. ochraceus

Binomial name
- Lestes ochraceus Selys, 1862

= Lestes ochraceus =

Species of damselfly

Lestes ochraceus is a species of damselfly in the family Lestidae, the spreadwings. It is known commonly as the ochre spreadwing. It is native to much of central Africa.

This species occurs in open freshwater habitat types such as pools and slow-running streams. It is a widespread species which is probably not threatened at this times.
