= Lestes pruinescens =

- Lestes pruinescens male in Madagascar

Conservation status
- Data Deficient (IUCN 3.1)

Scientific classification
- Kingdom: Animalia
- Phylum: Arthropoda
- Clade: Pancrustacea
- Class: Insecta
- Order: Odonata
- Suborder: Zygoptera
- Family: Lestidae
- Genus: Lestes
- Species: L. pruinescens

Binomial name
- Lestes pruinescens Martin, 1910

Species of damselfly

Lestes pruinescens is a species of spreadwing in the damselfly family Lestidae. It is endemic to Madagascar.
