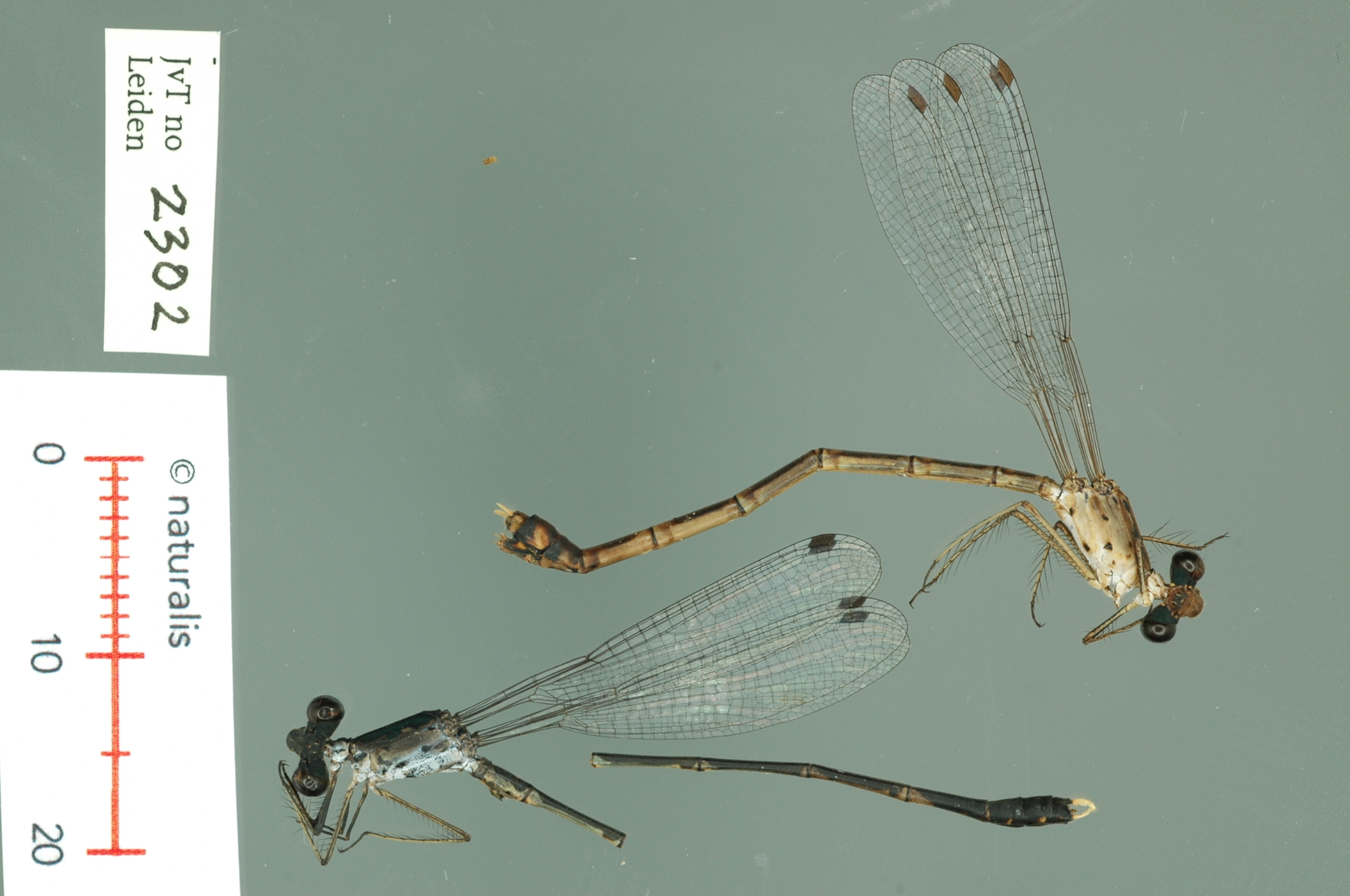

Scientific classification
- Kingdom: Animalia
- Phylum: Arthropoda
- Clade: Pancrustacea
- Class: Insecta
- Order: Odonata
- Suborder: Zygoptera
- Family: Lestidae
- Genus: Lestes
- Species: L. praevius

Binomial name
- Lestes praevius Lieftinck, 1940

= Lestes praevius =

Species of damselfly

Lestes praevius is a species of spreadwing in the damselfly family Lestidae.
