= Lestes paulistus =

- Lestes paulistus male in Brazil

Conservation status
- Least Concern (IUCN 3.1)

Scientific classification
- Kingdom: Animalia
- Phylum: Arthropoda
- Clade: Pancrustacea
- Class: Insecta
- Order: Odonata
- Suborder: Zygoptera
- Family: Lestidae
- Genus: Lestes
- Species: L. paulistus

Binomial name
- Lestes paulistus Calvert, 1909

Species of damselfly

Lestes paulistus is a species of spreadwing in the damselfly family Lestidae. It is found in South America.

The IUCN conservation status of Lestes paulistus is "LC", least concern, with no immediate threat to the species' survival. The IUCN status was reviewed in 2009.
