= Lestes curvatus =

Conservation status
- Least Concern (IUCN 3.1)

Scientific classification
- Kingdom: Animalia
- Phylum: Arthropoda
- Class: Insecta
- Order: Odonata
- Suborder: Zygoptera
- Family: Lestidae
- Genus: Lestes
- Species: L. curvatus

Binomial name
- Lestes curvatus Belle, 1997

Species of damselfly

Lestes curvatus is a species of spreadwing in the damselfly family Lestidae.

The IUCN conservation status of Lestes curvatus is "LC", least concern, with no immediate threat to the species' survival. The IUCN status was reviewed in 2009.
