= Lestes spatula =

- Lestes spatula male in Argentina
- Lestes spatula female in Argentina

Scientific classification
- Kingdom: Animalia
- Phylum: Arthropoda
- Clade: Pancrustacea
- Class: Insecta
- Order: Odonata
- Suborder: Zygoptera
- Family: Lestidae
- Genus: Lestes
- Species: L. spatula

Binomial name
- Lestes spatula Fraser, 1946

Species of damselfly

Lestes spatula is a species of spreadwing in the damselfly family Lestidae. It is found in South America.
