= Lestes dissimulans =

Conservation status
- Least Concern (IUCN 3.1)

Scientific classification
- Kingdom: Animalia
- Phylum: Arthropoda
- Clade: Pancrustacea
- Class: Insecta
- Order: Odonata
- Suborder: Zygoptera
- Family: Lestidae
- Genus: Lestes
- Species: L. dissimulans

Binomial name
- Lestes dissimulans Fraser, 1955

Species of damselfly

Lestes dissimulans is a species of damselfly in the family Lestidae, the spreadwings. It is known by the common name cryptic spreadwing.

It is native to central Africa, where it is widespread. It occurs in swampy habitat at pools and streams.
