= Lestes henshawi =

- Lestes henshawi male in Costa Rica

Conservation status
- Least Concern (IUCN 3.1)

Scientific classification
- Kingdom: Animalia
- Phylum: Arthropoda
- Clade: Pancrustacea
- Class: Insecta
- Order: Odonata
- Suborder: Zygoptera
- Family: Lestidae
- Genus: Lestes
- Species: L. henshawi

Binomial name
- Lestes henshawi Calvert, 1907

Species of damselfly

Lestes henshawi is a species of spreadwing in the damselfly family Lestidae. It is found in Central America and South America.

The IUCN conservation status of Lestes henshawi is "LC", least concern, with no immediate threat to the species' survival. The population is stable. The IUCN status was reviewed in 2009.
