= Lestes simulatrix =

Scientific classification
- Kingdom: Animalia
- Phylum: Arthropoda
- Class: Insecta
- Order: Odonata
- Suborder: Zygoptera
- Family: Lestidae
- Genus: Lestes
- Species: L. simulatrix

Binomial name
- Lestes simulatrix McLachlan, 1895

Species of damselfly

Lestes simulatrix is a species of stalk-winged damselfly in the family Lestidae.
