= Sinhalestes =

Conservation status
- Endangered (IUCN 3.1)

Scientific classification
- Kingdom: Animalia
- Phylum: Arthropoda
- Class: Insecta
- Order: Odonata
- Suborder: Zygoptera
- Family: Lestidae
- Genus: Sinhalestes; Fraser, 1951
- Species: S. orientalis

Binomial name
- Sinhalestes orientalis (Hagen, 1862)

Genus of damselflies

Sinhalestes orientalis, the emerald Sri Lanka spreadwing, is a species of damselfly in the family Lestidae. It is the only species in the genus Sinhalestes. The species was thought to be extinct since none have been found since it was first scientifically described in 1862. However, in 2012 this species was re-discovered by a young odonatologist Amila Sumanapala from the Peak Wilderness Sanctuary, Sri Lanka.

It is endemic to Sri Lanka and so far it has only been recorded from Peak Wilderness Sanctuary and its surrounding areas.

== Sources ==
- Martin Schorr; Martin Lindeboom; Dennis Paulson. "World Odonata List". University of Puget Sound.
- Sumanapala, A. P. and Bedjanič, M. (2013). Rediscovery of a long lost endemic damselfly Sinhalestes orientalis (Hagen in Selys, 1862) from Peak Wilderness Sanctuary, Sri Lanka (Zygoptera: Lestidae). Asian Journal of Conservation Biology. Vol. 2 (1): 44–47.
