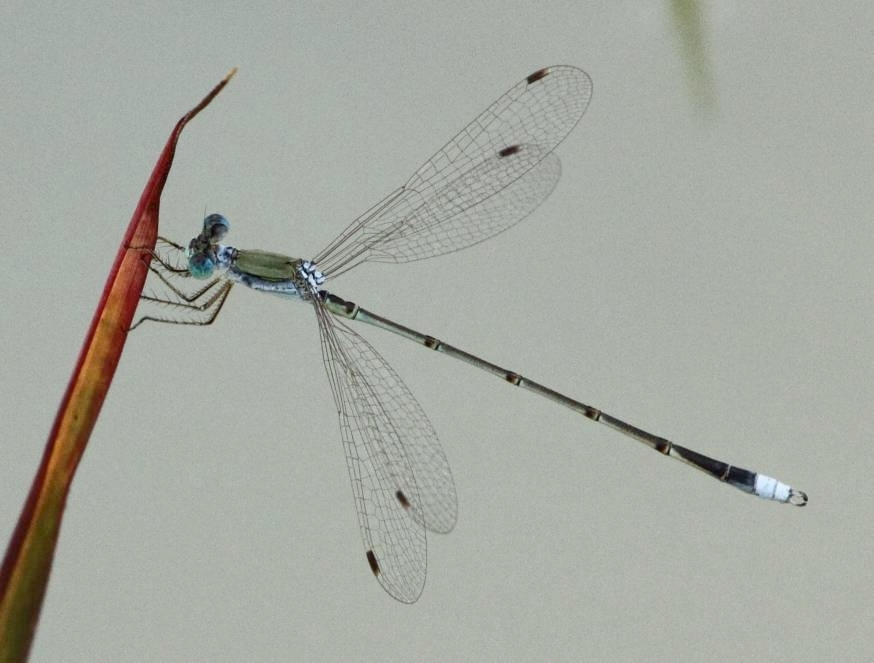
- Male

Conservation status
- Least Concern (IUCN 3.1)

Scientific classification
- Kingdom: Animalia
- Phylum: Arthropoda
- Class: Insecta
- Order: Odonata
- Suborder: Zygoptera
- Family: Lestidae
- Genus: Lestes
- Species: L. pallidus

Binomial name
- Lestes pallidus Rambur, 1842

= Lestes pallidus =

Species of damselfly

Lestes pallidus is a species of damselfly in the family Lestidae, the spreadwings. Its common names include pallid spreadwing and pale spreadwing. It is native to Africa, where it is widespread. It lives around pools and streams.
