= Lestes pinheyi =

- Lestes pinheyi male, Botswana

Conservation status
- Least Concern (IUCN 3.1)

Scientific classification
- Kingdom: Animalia
- Phylum: Arthropoda
- Clade: Pancrustacea
- Class: Insecta
- Order: Odonata
- Suborder: Zygoptera
- Family: Lestidae
- Genus: Lestes
- Species: L. pinheyi

Binomial name
- Lestes pinheyi Fraser, 1955

Species of damselfly

Lestes pinheyi is a species of damselfly in the family Lestidae, the spreadwings. It is known commonly as Pinhey's spreadwing. It is native to central Africa, where it is widespread. It lives in pools and swamps. It is not considered to be threatened.
