= Lestes numidicus =

Conservation status
- Data Deficient (IUCN 3.1)

Scientific classification
- Kingdom: Animalia
- Phylum: Arthropoda
- Class: Insecta
- Order: Odonata
- Suborder: Zygoptera
- Family: Lestidae
- Genus: Lestes
- Species: L. numidicus

Binomial name
- Lestes numidicus Samraoui, Weekers & Dumont, 2003

Species of damselfly

Lestes numidicus is a species of damselfly in the family Lestidae, the spreadwings. Its common names include Algerian spreadwing and late spreadwing. It is thought to be endemic to Algeria, but its range may extend into Tunisia, Morocco, and France.

This species occurs in freshwater wetlands. It retreats to higher altitudes after the breeding season, where it aestivates in cork oak forests.
