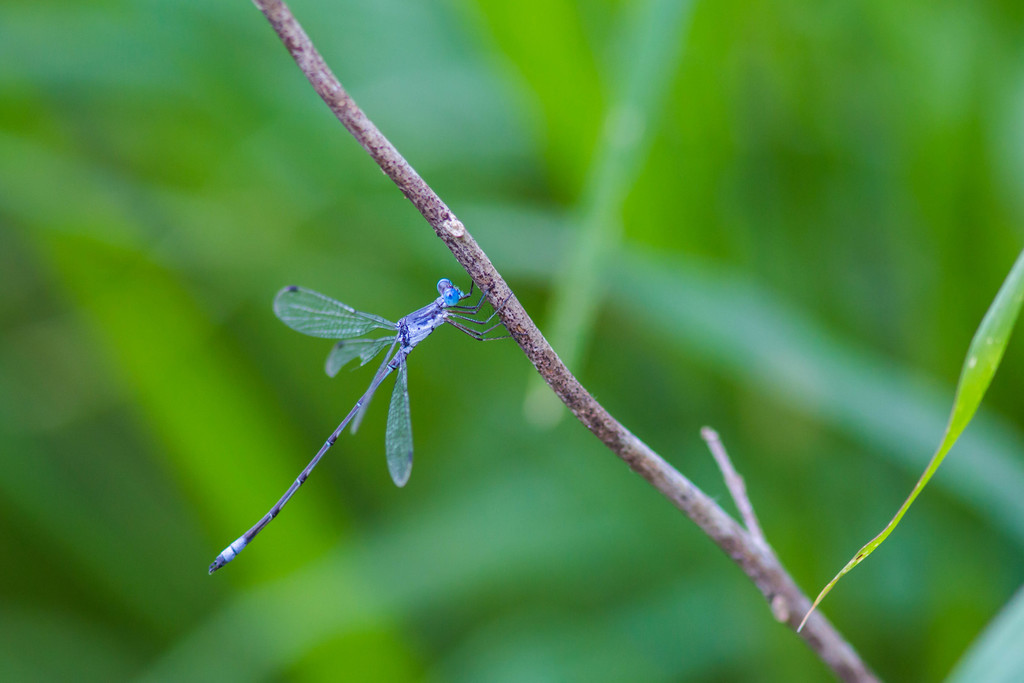

Conservation status
- Least Concern (IUCN 3.1)

Scientific classification
- Kingdom: Animalia
- Phylum: Arthropoda
- Class: Insecta
- Order: Odonata
- Suborder: Zygoptera
- Family: Lestidae
- Genus: Lestes
- Species: L. forficula

Binomial name
- Lestes forficula Rambur, 1842

= Lestes forficula =

Species of damselfly

Lestes forficula, the rainpool spreadwing, is a species of spreadwing in the damselfly family Lestidae. It is found in the Caribbean Sea, Central America, North America, and South America.

The IUCN conservation status of Lestes forficula is "LC", least concern, with no immediate threat to the species' survival. The population is stable. The IUCN status was reviewed in 2018.
