= Lestes spumarius =

- Lestes spumarius male, Monroe County, Florida, the United States

Conservation status
- Least Concern (IUCN 3.1)

Scientific classification
- Kingdom: Animalia
- Phylum: Arthropoda
- Clade: Pancrustacea
- Class: Insecta
- Order: Odonata
- Suborder: Zygoptera
- Family: Lestidae
- Genus: Lestes
- Species: L. spumarius

Binomial name
- Lestes spumarius Hagen in Selys, 1862

Species of damselfly

Lestes spumarius, the Antillean spreadwing, is a species of spreadwing in the damselfly family Lestidae. It is found in the Caribbean Sea and North America.

The IUCN conservation status of Lestes spumarius is "LC", least concern, with no immediate threat to the species' survival. The population is stable. The IUCN status was reviewed in 2017.
