= Lestes scalaris =

- Lestes scalaris male in Guatemala

Scientific classification
- Kingdom: Animalia
- Phylum: Arthropoda
- Clade: Pancrustacea
- Class: Insecta
- Order: Odonata
- Suborder: Zygoptera
- Family: Lestidae
- Genus: Lestes
- Species: L. scalaris

Binomial name
- Lestes scalaris Gundlach, 1888

Species of damselfly

Lestes scalaris is a species of spreadwing in the damselfly family Lestidae. It is found in the Caribbean Sea.
