= Lestes auripennis =

Conservation status
- Endangered (IUCN 3.1)

Scientific classification
- Kingdom: Animalia
- Phylum: Arthropoda
- Class: Insecta
- Order: Odonata
- Suborder: Zygoptera
- Family: Lestidae
- Genus: Lestes
- Species: L. auripennis

Binomial name
- Lestes auripennis Fraser, 1955

Species of damselfly

Lestes auripennis is a species of spreadwing in the damselfly family Lestidae.

The IUCN conservation status of Lestes auripennis is "EN", endangered. The species faces a high risk of extinction in the near future. The IUCN status was reviewed in 2017.
