= Lestes uncifer =

- Lestes uncifer male in South Africa
- Lestes uncifer female in South Africa

Conservation status
- Least Concern (IUCN 3.1)

Scientific classification
- Kingdom: Animalia
- Phylum: Arthropoda
- Clade: Pancrustacea
- Class: Insecta
- Order: Odonata
- Suborder: Zygoptera
- Family: Lestidae
- Genus: Lestes
- Species: L. uncifer

Binomial name
- Lestes uncifer Karsch, 1899

Species of damselfly

Lestes uncifer is a species of damselfly in the family Lestidae, the spreadwings. It is known commonly as the sickle spreadwing. It is native to much of the southern half of Africa, where it is widespread. It occurs near swamps and slow-moving streams, sometimes in forested areas. It is not considered to be threatened.
