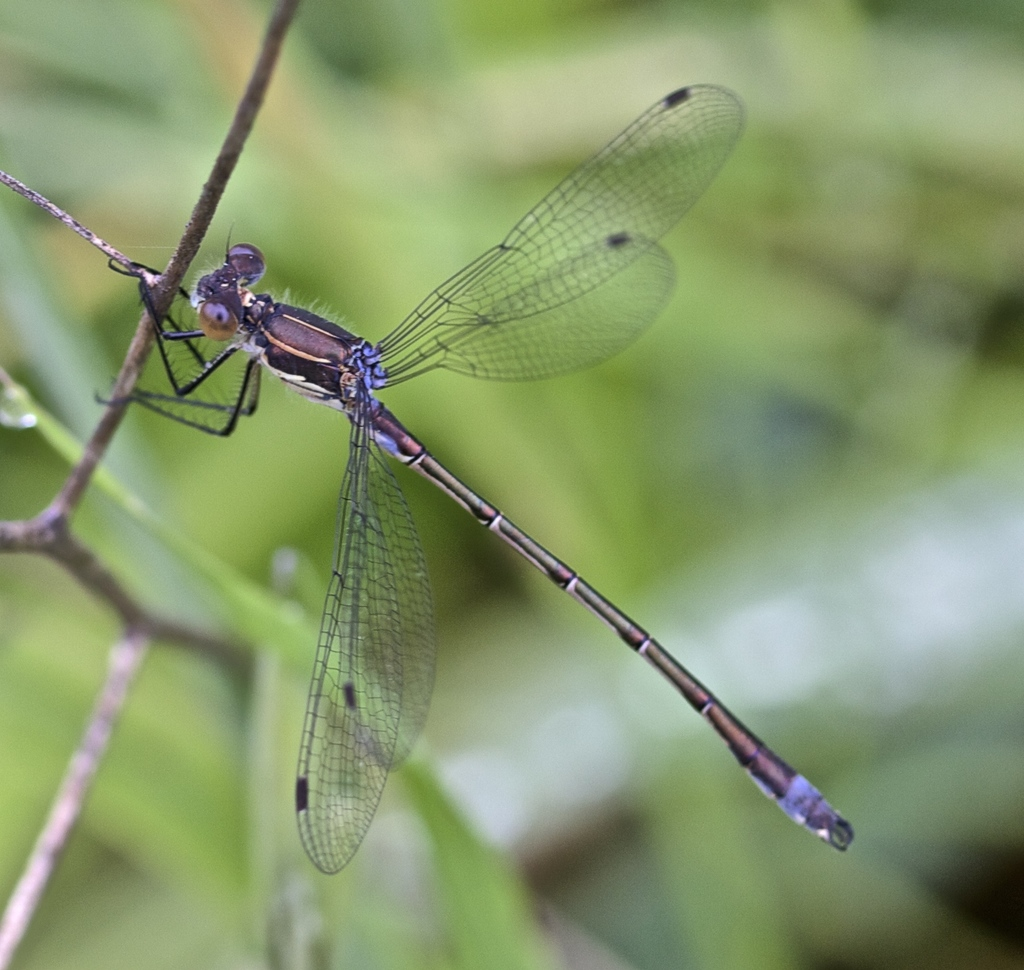

Conservation status
- Least Concern (IUCN 3.1)

Scientific classification
- Kingdom: Animalia
- Phylum: Arthropoda
- Class: Insecta
- Order: Odonata
- Suborder: Zygoptera
- Family: Lestidae
- Genus: Lestes
- Species: L. stultus

Binomial name
- Lestes stultus Hagen, 1861

= Lestes stultus =

Species of damselfly

Lestes stultus, the black spreadwing, is a species of spreadwing in the damselfly family Lestidae. It is found in North America.

The IUCN conservation status of Lestes stultus is "LC", least concern, with no immediate threat to the species' survival. The population is stable. The IUCN status was reviewed in 2017.
