= Lestes ictericus =

Conservation status
- Least Concern (IUCN 3.1)

Scientific classification
- Kingdom: Animalia
- Phylum: Arthropoda
- Class: Insecta
- Order: Odonata
- Suborder: Zygoptera
- Family: Lestidae
- Genus: Lestes
- Species: L. ictericus

Binomial name
- Lestes ictericus Gerstäcker, 1869

Species of damselfly

Lestes ictericus is a species of damselfly in the family Lestidae, the spreadwings. It is known by the common names tawny spreadwing and yellow spreadwing. It is native to much of eastern and western Africa. It lives near seasonal pools in savanna habitat.
