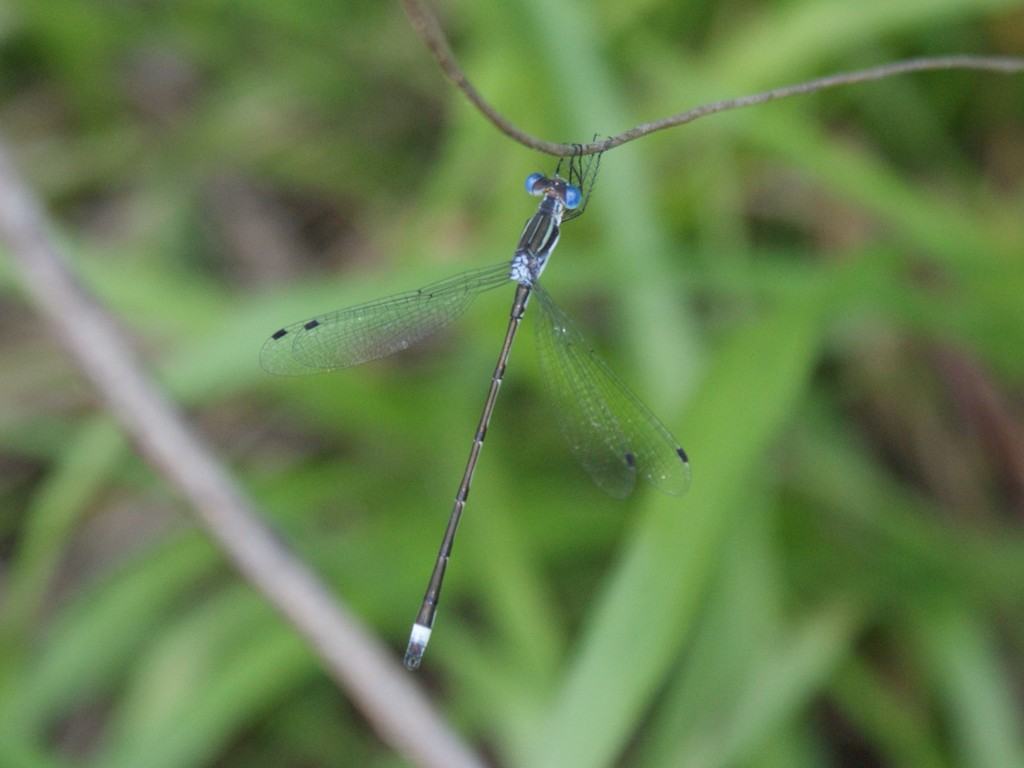

Conservation status
- Least Concern (IUCN 3.1)

Scientific classification
- Kingdom: Animalia
- Phylum: Arthropoda
- Class: Insecta
- Order: Odonata
- Suborder: Zygoptera
- Family: Lestidae
- Genus: Lestes
- Species: L. australis

Binomial name
- Lestes australis Walker, 1952

Synonyms
- Lestes disjunctus australis Walker, 1952

= Lestes australis =

Species of damselfly

Lestes australis, the southern spreadwing, is a species of spreadwing in the damselfly family Lestidae. It is found in North America.

The IUCN conservation status of Lestes australis is "LC", least concern, with no immediate threat to the species' survival. The population is stable. The IUCN status was reviewed in 2017.

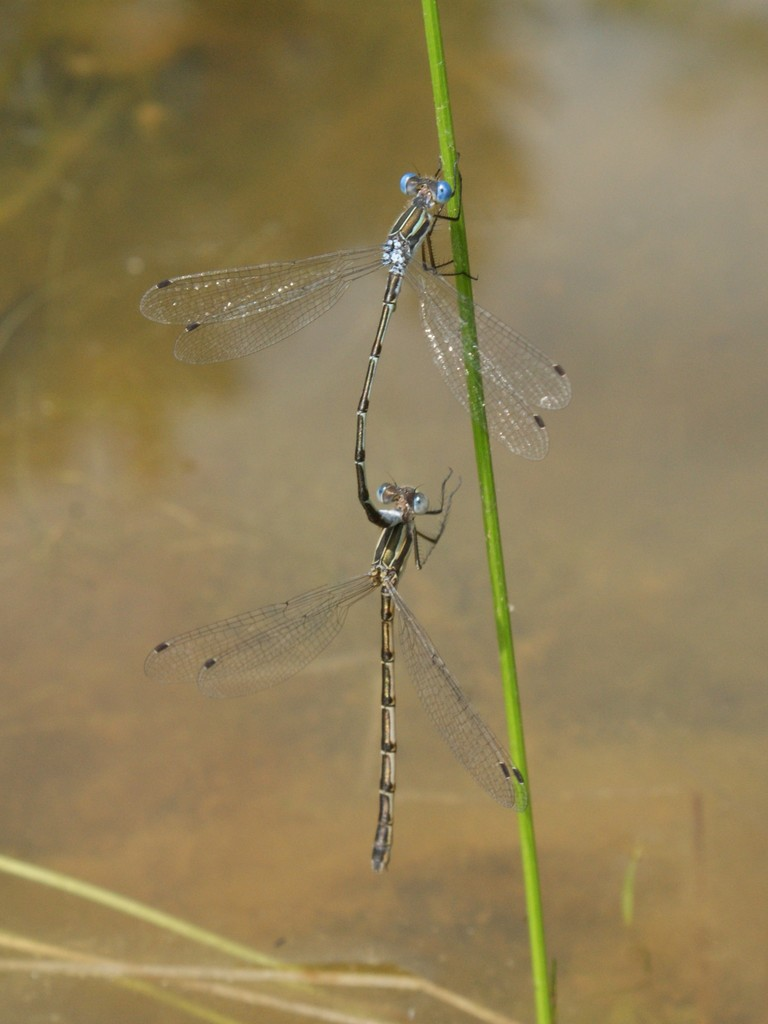
pair
