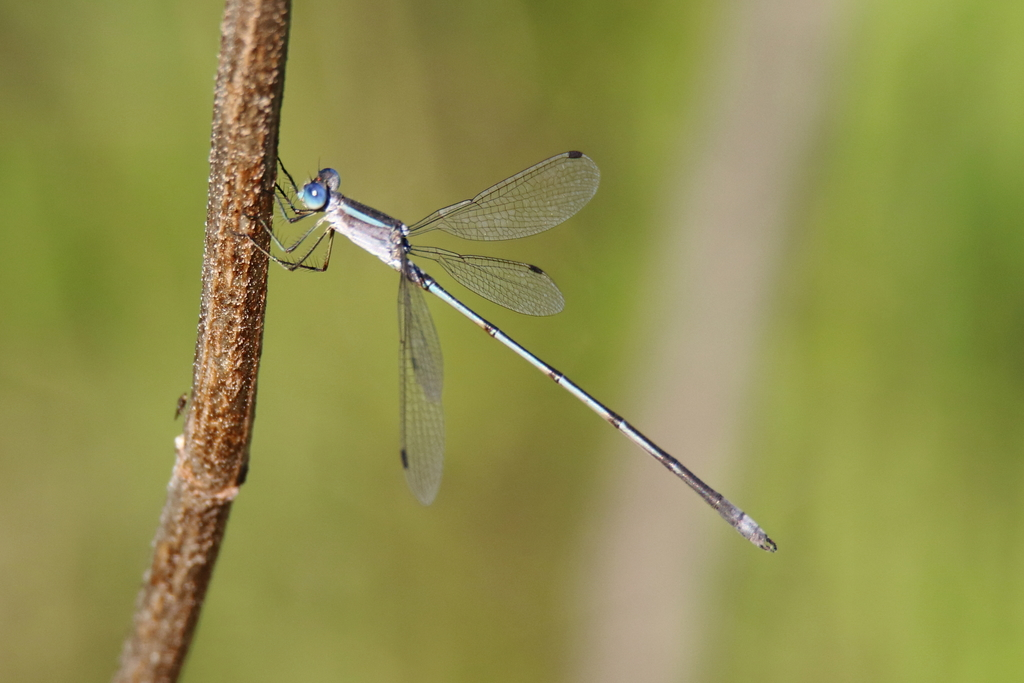

Conservation status
- Least Concern (IUCN 3.1)

Scientific classification
- Kingdom: Animalia
- Phylum: Arthropoda
- Class: Insecta
- Order: Odonata
- Suborder: Zygoptera
- Family: Lestidae
- Genus: Lestes
- Species: L. alacer

Binomial name
- Lestes alacer Hagen, 1861

= Lestes alacer =

Species of damselfly

Lestes alacer, the plateau spreadwing, is a species of spreadwing in the damselfly family Lestidae. It is found in Central America and North America.

The IUCN conservation status of Lestes alacer is "LC", least concern, with no immediate threat to the species' survival. The population is stable. The IUCN status was reviewed in 2017.

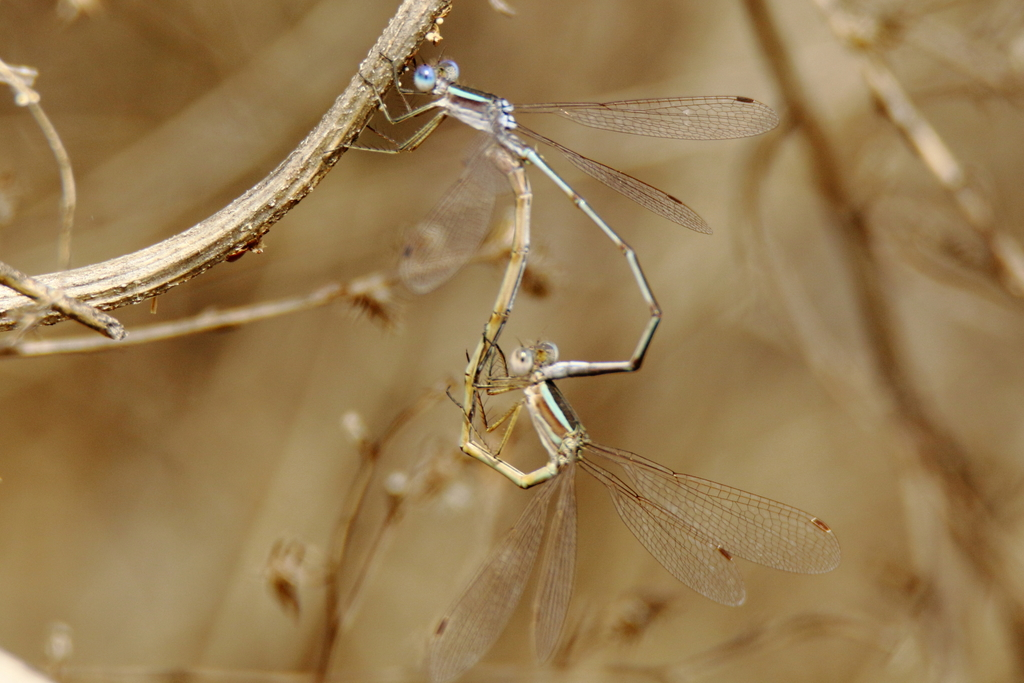
pair copulating
