= Lestes simplex =

Scientific classification
- Kingdom: Animalia
- Phylum: Arthropoda
- Class: Insecta
- Order: Odonata
- Suborder: Zygoptera
- Family: Lestidae
- Genus: Lestes
- Species: L. simplex

Binomial name
- Lestes simplex Hagen, 1861

Species of damselfly

Lestes simplex is a species of spreadwing in the damselfly family Lestidae. It is found in Central America.
