= Lestes helix =

Conservation status
- Least Concern (IUCN 3.1)

Scientific classification
- Kingdom: Animalia
- Phylum: Arthropoda
- Class: Insecta
- Order: Odonata
- Suborder: Zygoptera
- Family: Lestidae
- Genus: Lestes
- Species: L. helix

Binomial name
- Lestes helix Ris, 1918

Species of damselfly

Lestes helix is a species of spreadwing in the damselfly family Lestidae. It is found in South America.

The IUCN conservation status of Lestes helix is "LC", least concern, with no immediate threat to the species' survival. The IUCN status was reviewed in 2009.
