= Lestes malaisei =

Conservation status
- Data Deficient (IUCN 3.1)

Scientific classification
- Kingdom: Animalia
- Phylum: Arthropoda
- Class: Insecta
- Order: Odonata
- Suborder: Zygoptera
- Family: Lestidae
- Genus: Lestes
- Species: L. malaisei

Binomial name
- Lestes malaisei Schmidt, 1964

Species of damselfly

Lestes malaisei is a species of spreadwing in the damselfly family Lestidae.
