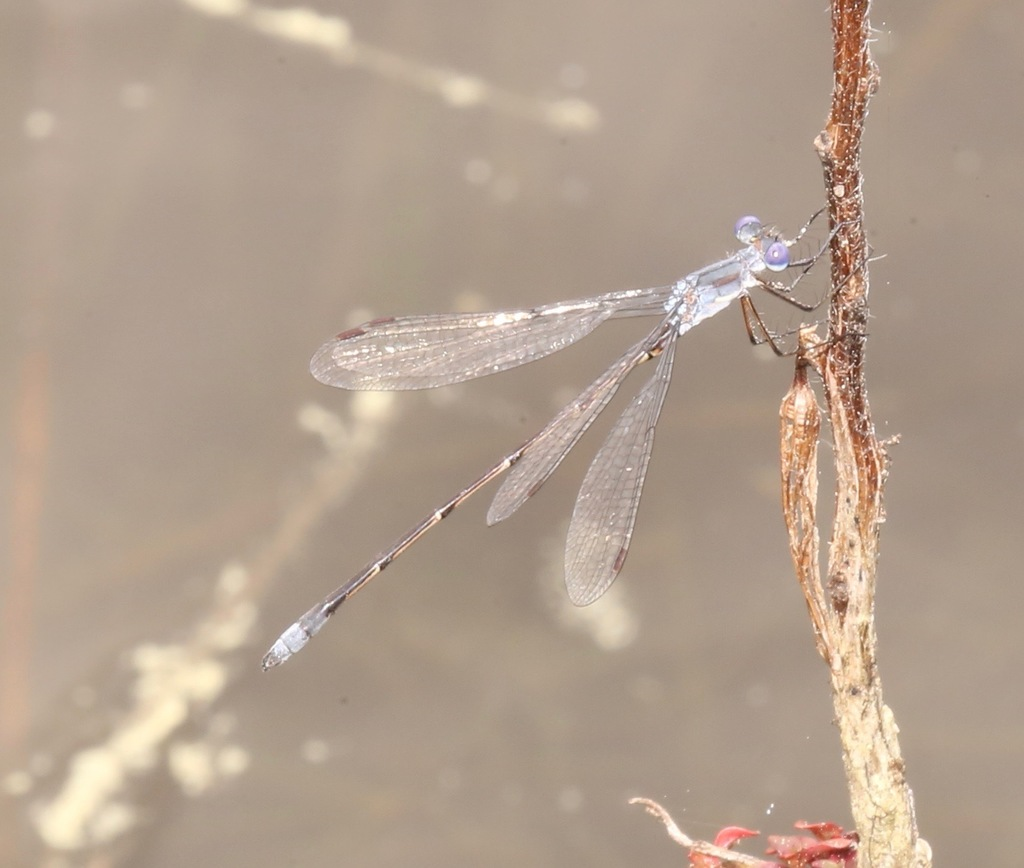

Conservation status
- Least Concern (IUCN 3.1)

Scientific classification
- Kingdom: Animalia
- Phylum: Arthropoda
- Class: Insecta
- Order: Odonata
- Suborder: Zygoptera
- Family: Lestidae
- Genus: Lestes
- Species: L. vidua

Binomial name
- Lestes vidua Hagen, 1861

= Lestes vidua =

Species of damselfly

Lestes vidua, the Carolina spreadwing, is a species of spreadwing in the damselfly family Lestidae. It is found in North America.

The IUCN conservation status of Lestes vidua is "LC", least concern, with no immediate threat to the species' survival. The population is stable. The IUCN status was reviewed in 2017.
