= Lestes dichrostigma =

- Lestes dichrostigma female in Peru

Conservation status
- Least Concern (IUCN 3.1)

Scientific classification
- Kingdom: Animalia
- Phylum: Arthropoda
- Clade: Pancrustacea
- Class: Insecta
- Order: Odonata
- Suborder: Zygoptera
- Family: Lestidae
- Genus: Lestes
- Species: L. dichrostigma

Binomial name
- Lestes dichrostigma Calvert, 1909

Species of damselfly

Lestes dichrostigma is a species of spreadwing in the damselfly family Lestidae. It is found in South America.

The IUCN conservation status of Lestes dichrostigma is "LC", least concern, with no immediate threat to the species' survival. The IUCN status was reviewed in 2009.
