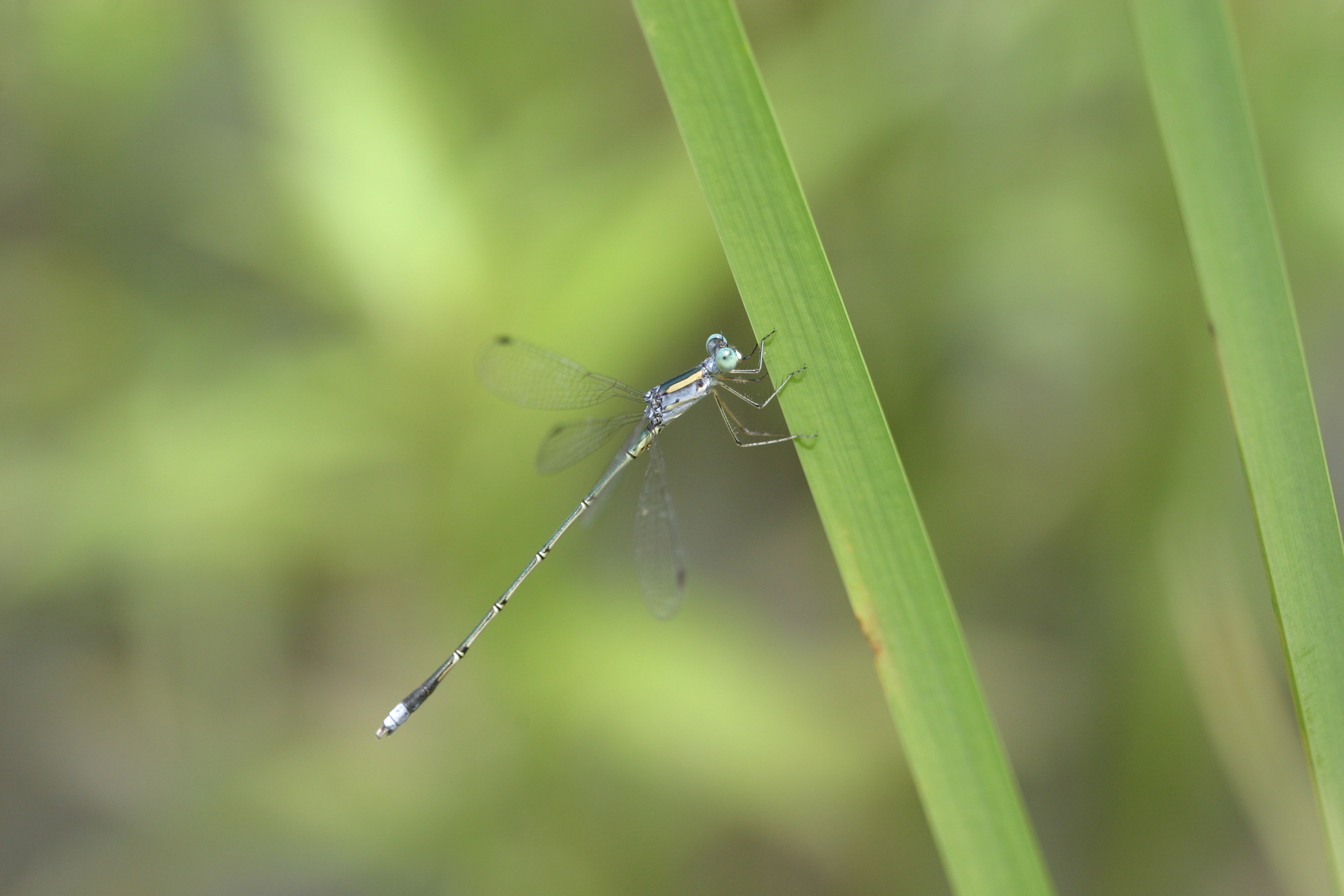
- Lestes nigriceps

Conservation status
- Data Deficient (IUCN 3.1)

Scientific classification
- Kingdom: Animalia
- Phylum: Arthropoda
- Clade: Pancrustacea
- Class: Insecta
- Order: Odonata
- Suborder: Zygoptera
- Family: Lestidae
- Genus: Lestes
- Species: L. nigriceps

Binomial name
- Lestes nigriceps Fraser, 1924

= Lestes nigriceps =

Species of damselfly

Lestes nigriceps is a species of spreadwing in the damselfly family Lestidae.

Mating
