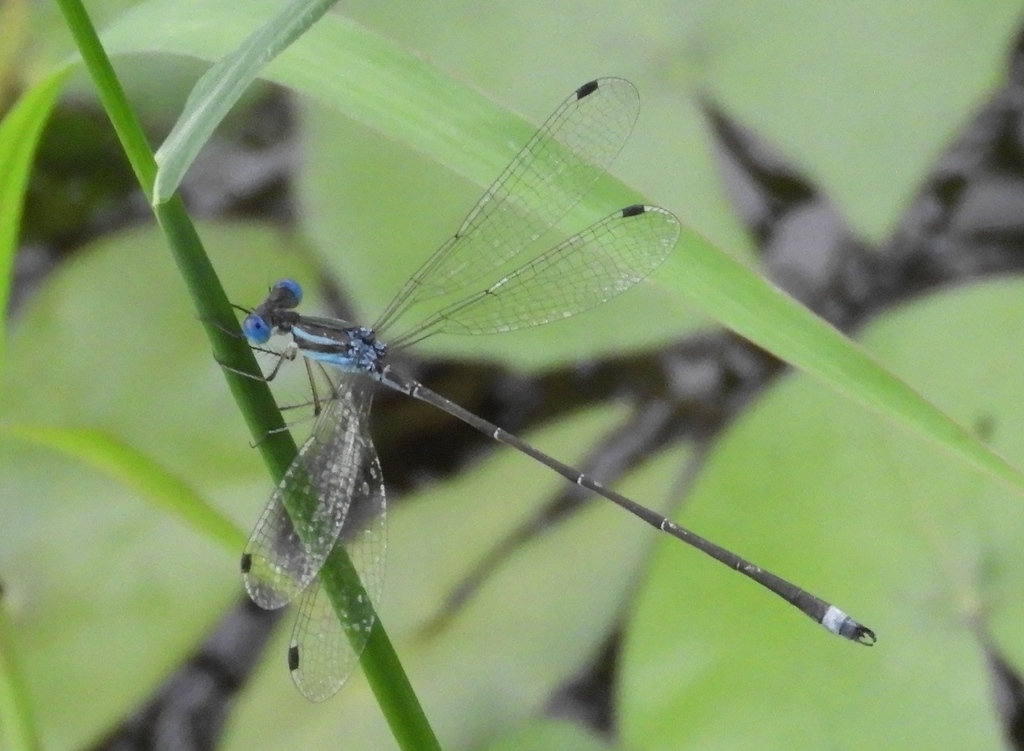

Conservation status
- Least Concern (IUCN 3.1)

Scientific classification
- Kingdom: Animalia
- Phylum: Arthropoda
- Class: Insecta
- Order: Odonata
- Suborder: Zygoptera
- Family: Lestidae
- Genus: Lestes
- Species: L. tenuatus

Binomial name
- Lestes tenuatus Rambur, 1842

= Lestes tenuatus =

Species of damselfly

Lestes tenuatus, the blue-striped spreadwing, is a species of spreadwing in the damselfly family Lestidae. It is found in the Caribbean Sea, Central America, North America, and South America.

The IUCN conservation status of Lestes tenuatus is "LC", least concern, with no immediate threat to the species' survival. The population is stable. The IUCN status was reviewed in 2017.
