= Lestes apollinaris =

- Lestes apollinaris male in Colombia

Conservation status
- Least Concern (IUCN 3.1)

Scientific classification
- Kingdom: Animalia
- Phylum: Arthropoda
- Clade: Pancrustacea
- Class: Insecta
- Order: Odonata
- Suborder: Zygoptera
- Family: Lestidae
- Genus: Lestes
- Species: L. apollinaris

Binomial name
- Lestes apollinaris Navás, 1934

Species of damselfly

Lestes apollinaris is a species of spreadwing in the damselfly family Lestidae. It is found in South America.
