= Lestes auritus =

Conservation status
- Least Concern (IUCN 3.1)

Scientific classification
- Kingdom: Animalia
- Phylum: Arthropoda
- Class: Insecta
- Order: Odonata
- Suborder: Zygoptera
- Family: Lestidae
- Genus: Lestes
- Species: L. auritus

Binomial name
- Lestes auritus Hagen in Selys, 1862

Species of damselfly

Lestes auritus is a species of spreadwing in the damselfly family Lestidae. It is found in South America.

The IUCN conservation status of Lestes auritus is "LC", least concern, with no immediate threat to the species' survival. The IUCN status was reviewed in 2009.
