= Lestes tricolor =

- Lestes tricolor male in Brazil

Scientific classification
- Kingdom: Animalia
- Phylum: Arthropoda
- Clade: Pancrustacea
- Class: Insecta
- Order: Odonata
- Suborder: Zygoptera
- Family: Lestidae
- Genus: Lestes
- Species: L. tricolor

Binomial name
- Lestes tricolor Erichson in Schomburgk, 1848

Species of damselfly

Lestes tricolor is a species of spreadwing in the damselfly family Lestidae commonly known as a Brown-striped Spreadwing. It is found in South America.
