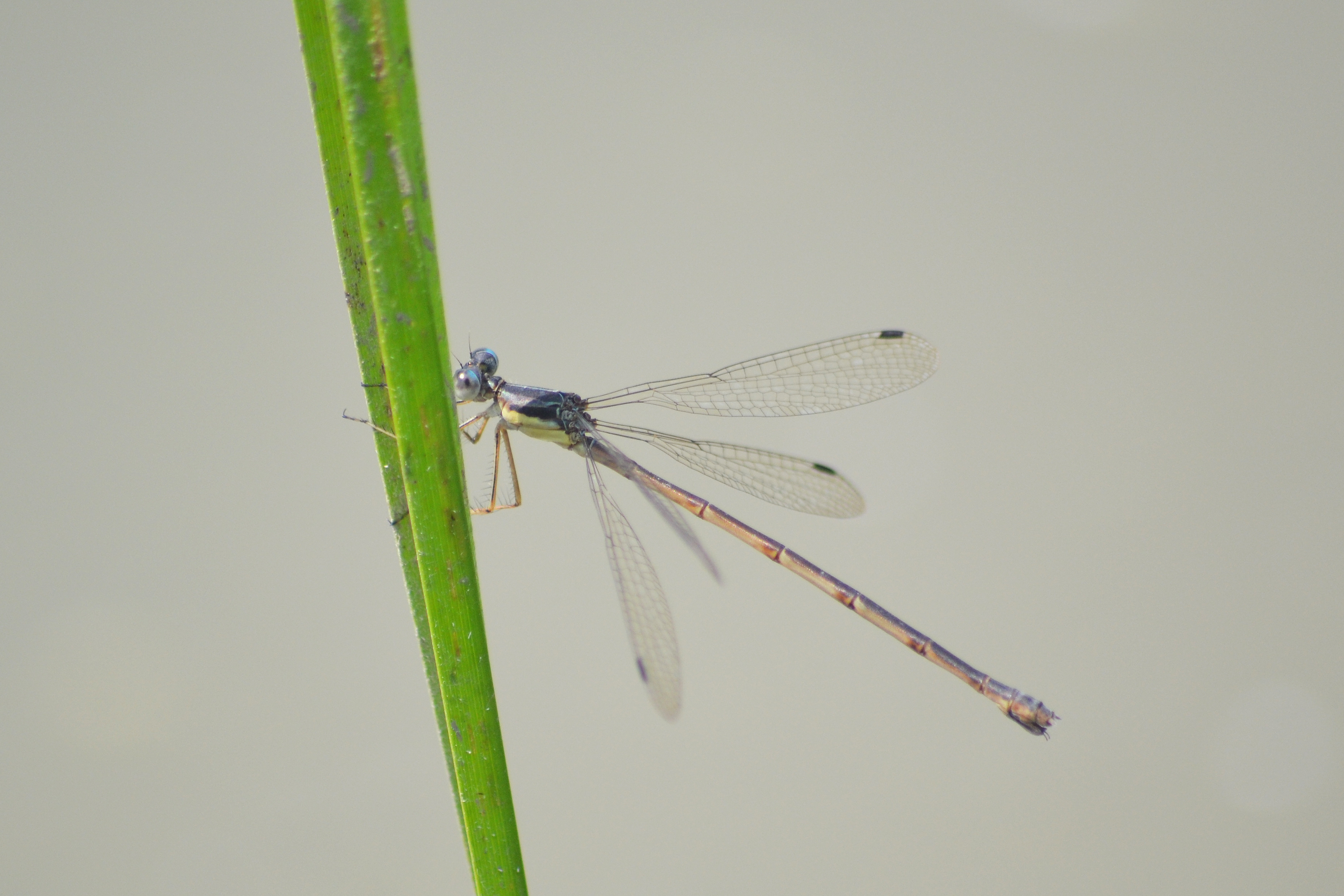

Conservation status
- Least Concern (IUCN 3.1)

- Secure (NatureServe)

Scientific classification
- Kingdom: Animalia
- Phylum: Arthropoda
- Class: Insecta
- Order: Odonata
- Suborder: Zygoptera
- Family: Lestidae
- Genus: Lestes
- Species: L. rectangularis

Binomial name
- Lestes rectangularis Say, 1839

= Lestes rectangularis =

Species of dragonfly

Lestes rectangularis is a species of damselfly in the family Lestidae, the spreadwings. It is known by the common name slender spreadwing. It is native to eastern North America, including eastern Canada and the United States.

This damselfly is long and thin. The body is black with a pale blue face, and the wings have yellow edges. The female is larger, with paler yellow on the wings. This species lives along springs and drying ponds.
