= Lestes trichonus =

Scientific classification
- Kingdom: Animalia
- Phylum: Arthropoda
- Class: Insecta
- Order: Odonata
- Suborder: Zygoptera
- Family: Lestidae
- Genus: Lestes
- Species: L. trichonus

Binomial name
- Lestes trichonus Belle, 1997

Species of damselfly

Lestes trichonus is a species in the spreadwing damselfly family, Lestidae.
