= Lestes fernandoi =

Scientific classification
- Kingdom: Animalia
- Phylum: Arthropoda
- Class: Insecta
- Order: Odonata
- Suborder: Zygoptera
- Family: Lestidae
- Genus: Lestes
- Species: L. fernandoi

Binomial name
- Lestes fernandoi Costa, De Souza & Muzón, 2006

Species of damselfly

Lestes fernandoi is a species of spreadwing in the damselfly family Lestidae.
