= Lestes secula =

Scientific classification
- Kingdom: Animalia
- Phylum: Arthropoda
- Class: Insecta
- Order: Odonata
- Suborder: Zygoptera
- Family: Lestidae
- Genus: Lestes
- Species: L. secula

Binomial name
- Lestes secula May, 1993

Species of damselfly

Lestes secula is a species of spreadwing in the damselfly family Lestidae. It is found in Central America.
