= Lestes pictus =

- Lestes pictus male in Brazil

Scientific classification
- Kingdom: Animalia
- Phylum: Arthropoda
- Clade: Pancrustacea
- Class: Insecta
- Order: Odonata
- Suborder: Zygoptera
- Family: Lestidae
- Genus: Lestes
- Species: L. pictus

Binomial name
- Lestes pictus Hagen in Selys, 1862

Species of damselfly

Lestes pictus is a species of spreadwing in the damselfly family Lestidae. It is found in South America.
