= Lestes jurzitzai =

Scientific classification
- Kingdom: Animalia
- Phylum: Arthropoda
- Class: Insecta
- Order: Odonata
- Suborder: Zygoptera
- Family: Lestidae
- Genus: Lestes
- Species: L. jurzitzai

Binomial name
- Lestes jurzitzai Muzón, 1994

Species of damselfly

Lestes jurzitzai is a species of spreadwing in the damselfly family Lestidae.
