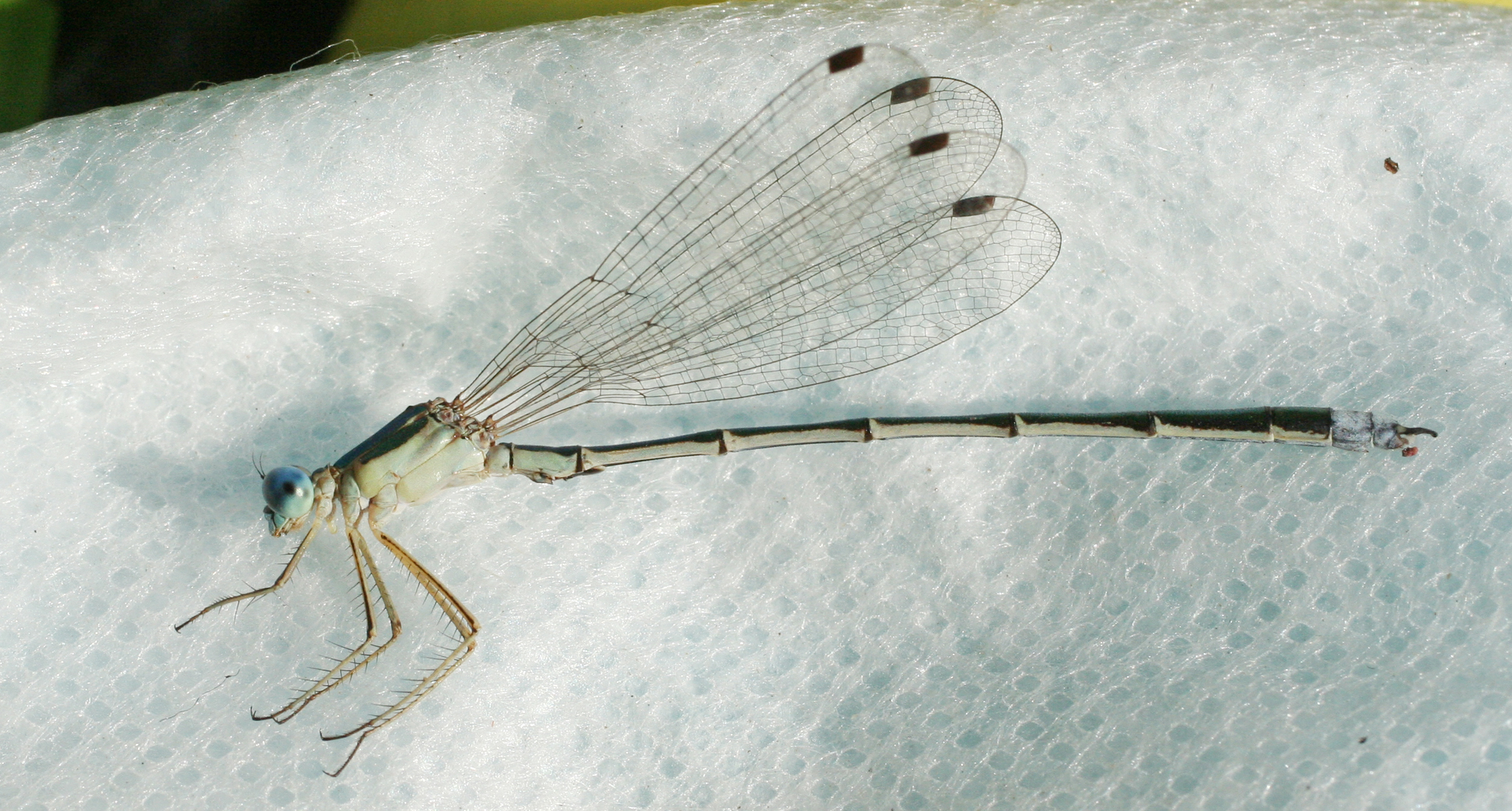

Scientific classification
- Kingdom: Animalia
- Phylum: Arthropoda
- Class: Insecta
- Order: Odonata
- Suborder: Zygoptera
- Family: Lestidae
- Genus: Lestes
- Species: L. japonicus

Binomial name
- Lestes japonicus Selys, 1883

= Lestes japonicus =

Species of damselfly

Lestes japonicus is a species of spreadwing in the damselfly family Lestidae.
