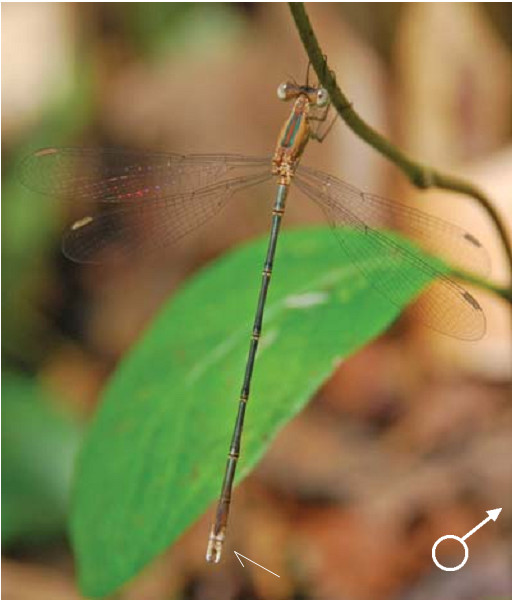
- Male
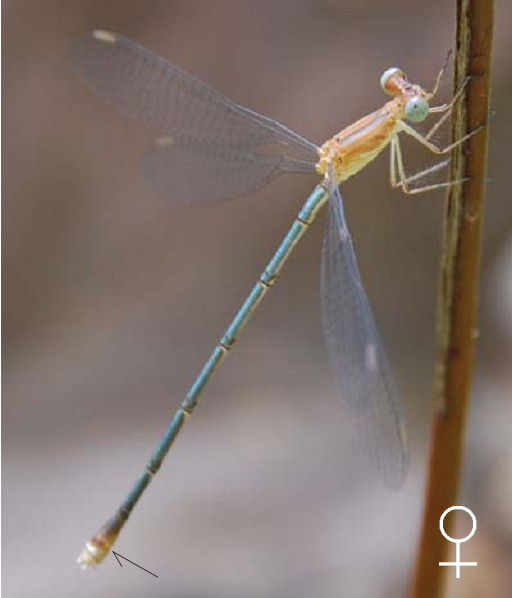
- Female

Conservation status
- Least Concern (IUCN 3.1)

Scientific classification
- Kingdom: Animalia
- Phylum: Arthropoda
- Clade: Pancrustacea
- Class: Insecta
- Order: Odonata
- Suborder: Zygoptera
- Family: Lestidae
- Genus: Lestes
- Species: L. viridulus

Binomial name
- Lestes viridulus Rambur, 1842

= Lestes viridulus =

Species of damselfly

Lestes viridulus, the emerald-striped spreadwing, is a damselfly species in the family Lestidae, the spreadwings. It is native to Bangladesh, India, and Thailand.

== Description and habitat ==
It is a medium sized damselfly with brown-capped yellow eyes. Its thorax is khaki brown, paling to creamy white on the sides. The dorsum of the thorax has two very narrow metallic green stripes, running closely parallel to the mid-dorsal carina. Wings are transparent with pale brown pterostigma. Abdomen is yellowish brown on the sides with metallic-green dorsal stripes up to segment 8. Segment 9 has a dark dorsal mark on basal half. The remaining half of segment 9, segment 10 and the anal appendages are pale yellow. Female is similar to the male. It can be easily distinguished from all others species of this genus by its uniform pale brown color and the pair of dorsal thoracic metallic green stripes of uniform width.

It is commonly found among dry grass during the summer season enjoying camouflage in the plains.

== See also ==
- List of odonates of India
- List of odonata of Kerala
