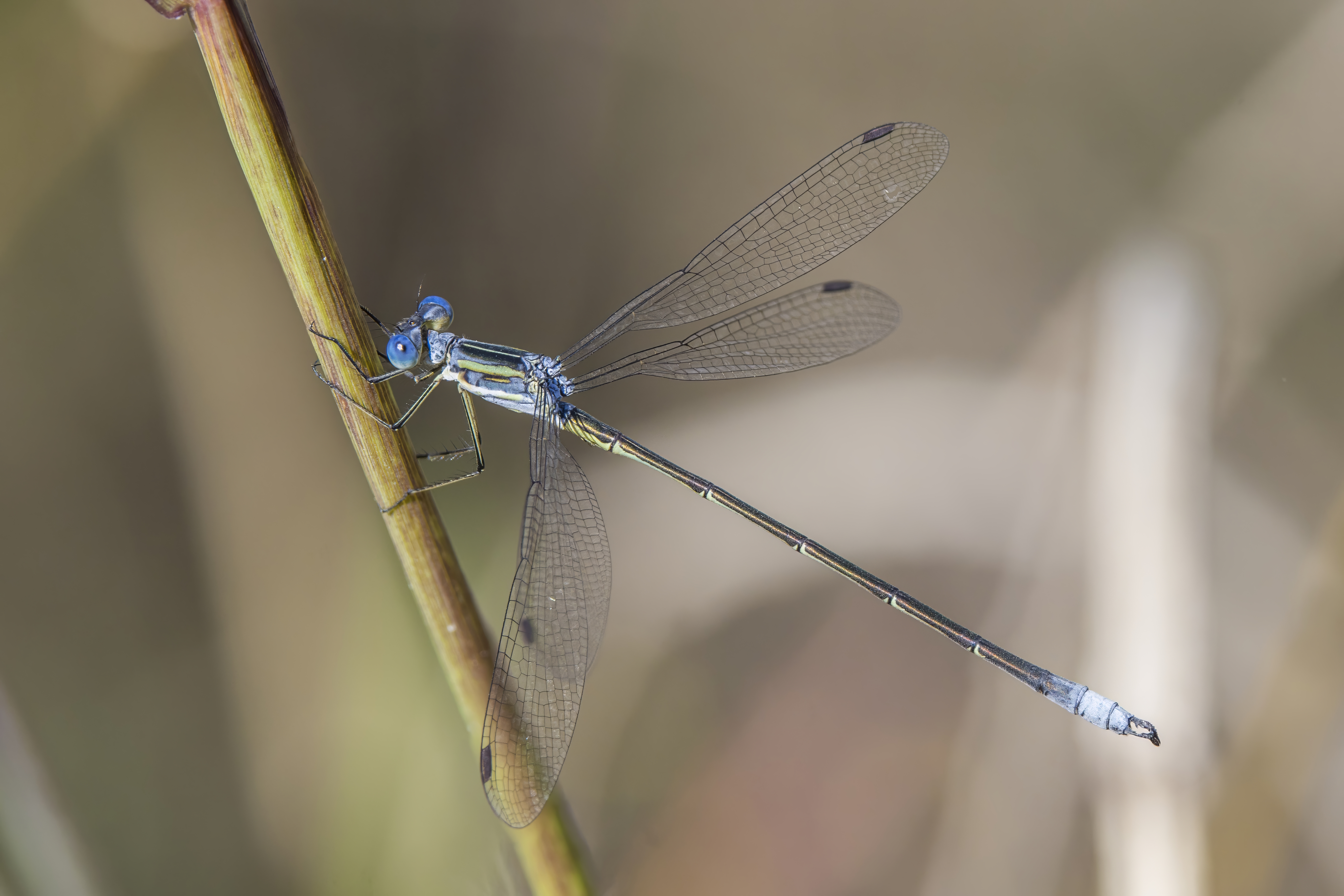
- Male
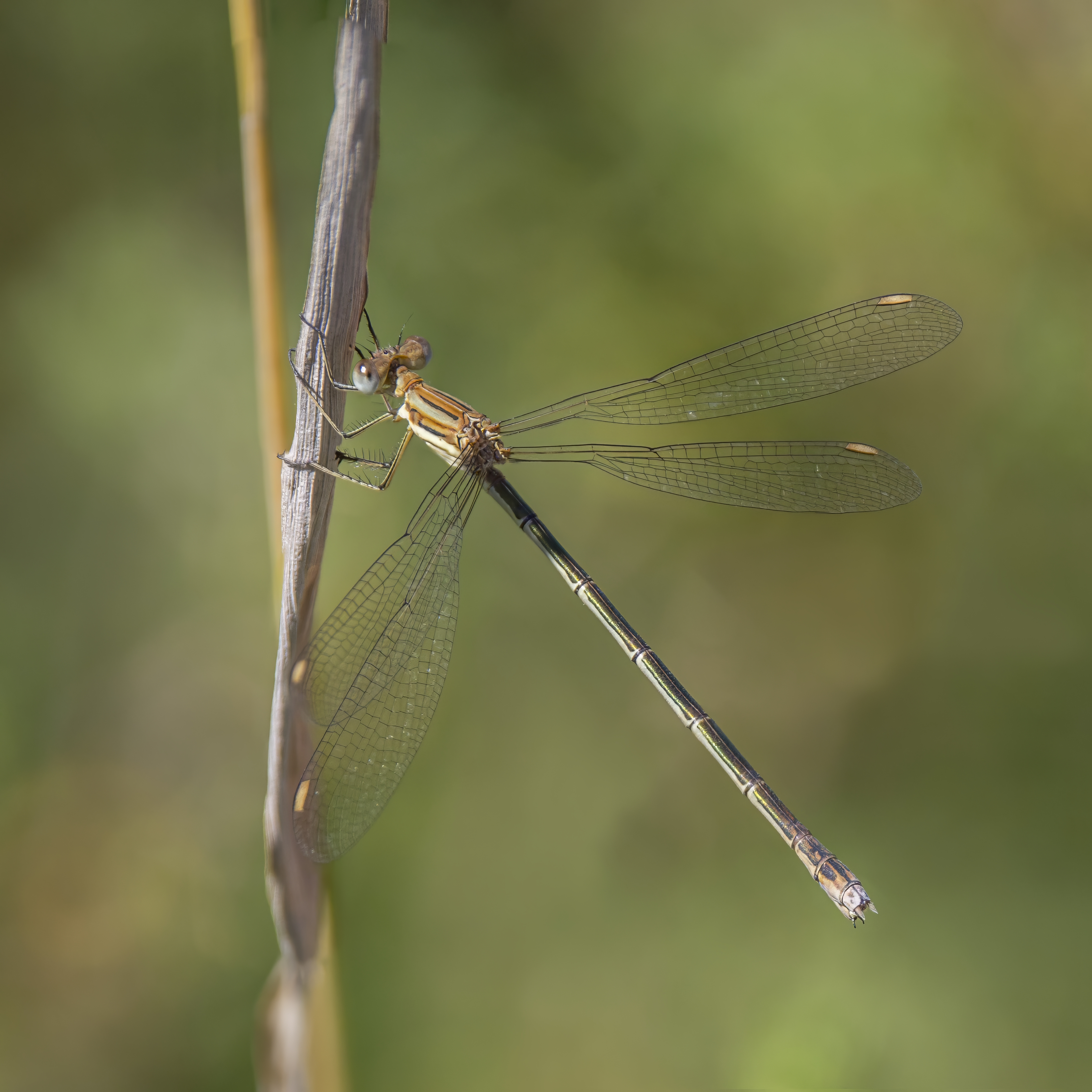
- Female both in Eswatini

Conservation status
- Least Concern (IUCN 3.1)

Scientific classification
- Kingdom: Animalia
- Phylum: Arthropoda
- Class: Insecta
- Order: Odonata
- Suborder: Zygoptera
- Family: Lestidae
- Genus: Lestes
- Species: L. plagiatus

Binomial name
- Lestes plagiatus (Burmeister, 1839)

Synonyms
- Lestes forceps Rambur, 1842; Lestes obscurus Kirby, 1898; Lestes regulatus Martin, 1910; Lestes tarryi Pinhey, 1962

= Lestes plagiatus =

Species of damselfly

Lestes plagiatus is a species of damselfly in the family Lestidae, the spreadwings. It is known commonly as the highlands spreadwing, common spreadwing, and stream spreadwing.

This species is native to much of the southern half of Africa, where it is widespread. It is recorded in Angola, Botswana, Kenya, Malawi, Mozambique, Nigeria, South Africa, Sudan, Tanzania, Uganda, Zambia, Zimbabwe, and possibly Burundi.

This damselfly lives near pools, swamps, and streams.
