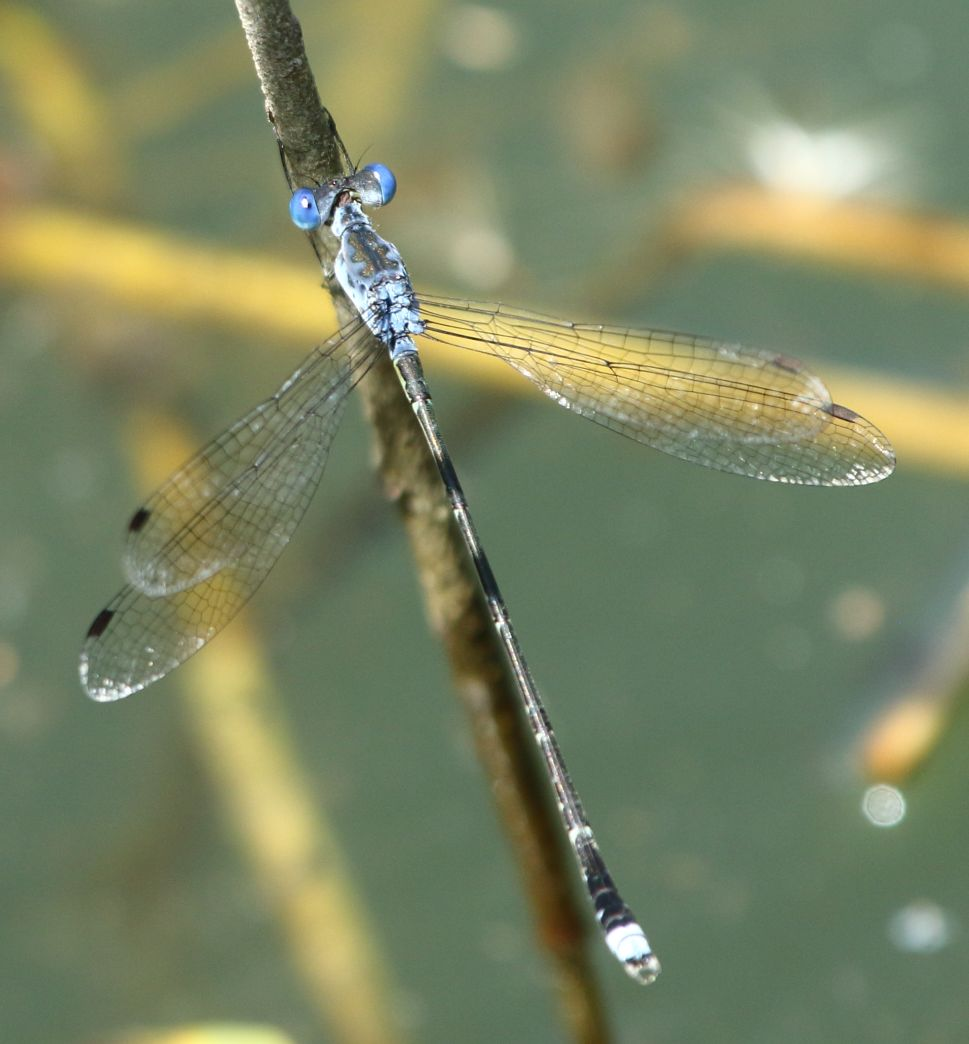
- Male

Conservation status
- Least Concern (IUCN 3.1)

Scientific classification
- Kingdom: Animalia
- Phylum: Arthropoda
- Class: Insecta
- Order: Odonata
- Suborder: Zygoptera
- Family: Lestidae
- Genus: Lestes
- Species: L. tridens

Binomial name
- Lestes tridens McLachlan, 1895

= Lestes tridens =

Species of damselfly

Lestes tridens is a species of damselfly in the family Lestidae, the spreadwings. It is known commonly as the spotted spreadwing. It is native to much of the southern half of Africa, where it is widespread. It lives along the edges of lakes and swamps. It is not considered to be threatened.

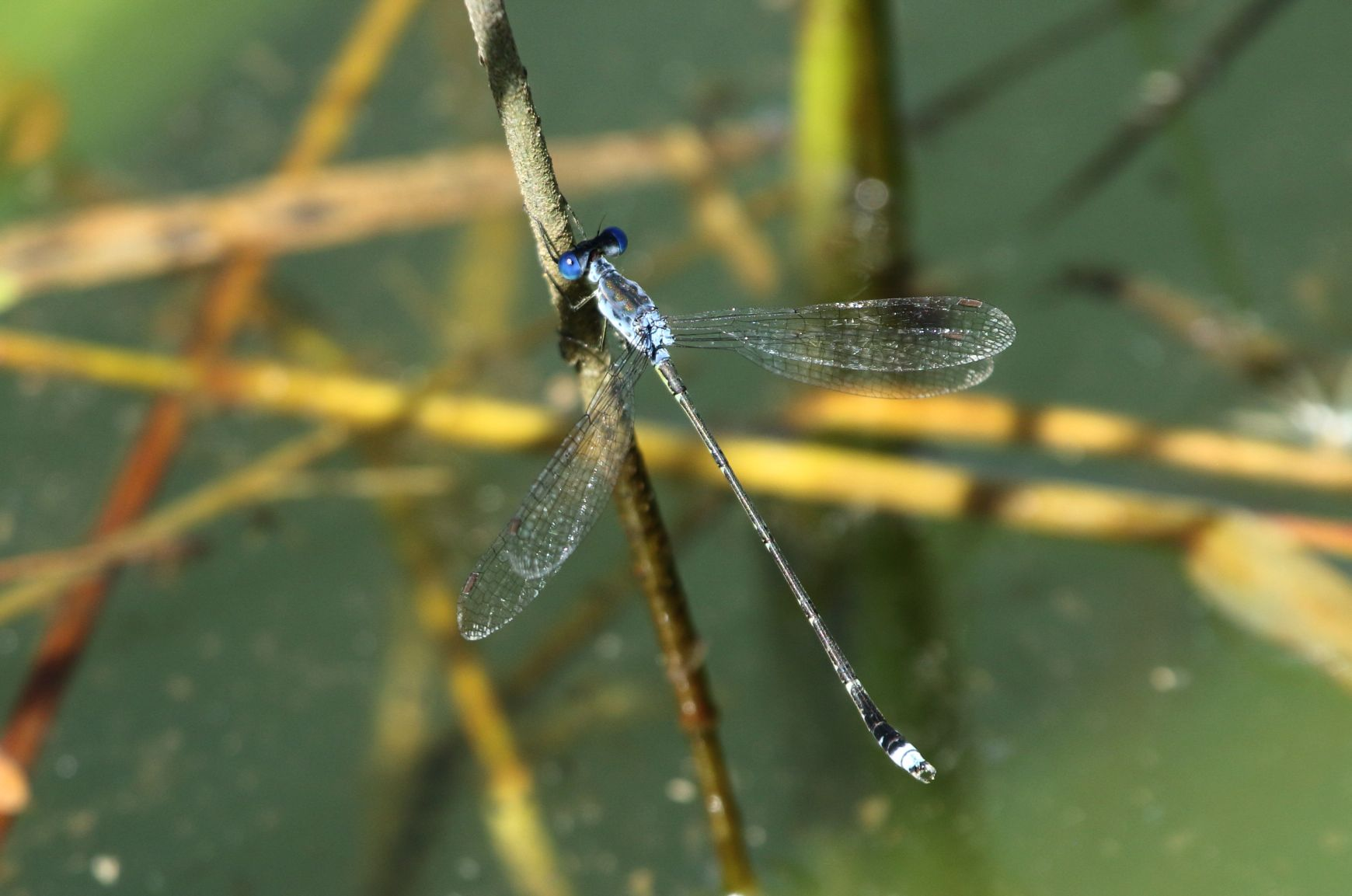
Male
