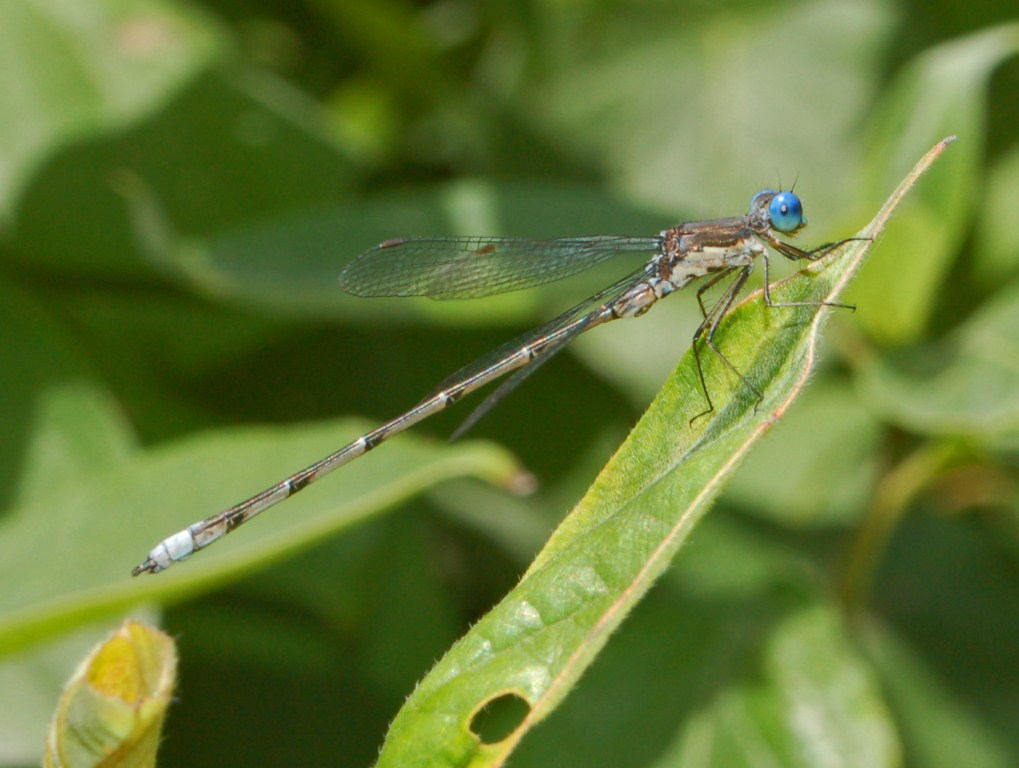
- Lestes congener in Toronto, Canada

Conservation status
- Secure (NatureServe)

Scientific classification
- Kingdom: Animalia
- Phylum: Arthropoda
- Clade: Pancrustacea
- Class: Insecta
- Order: Odonata
- Suborder: Zygoptera
- Family: Lestidae
- Genus: Lestes
- Species: L. congener

Binomial name
- Lestes congener Hagen, 1861

= Lestes congener =

Species of damselfly

Spotted spreadwings in tandem in Alberta, Canada

Lestes congener is a species of damselfly in the family Lestidae, the spreadwings. It is known by the common name spotted spreadwing.

== Description ==
Lestes congener can reach a length of 35–42 millimetres (1.4–1.7 in) in males, while females are smaller, reaching a length of 32–38 millimetres (1.3–1.5 in). In the western part of their range, these dragonflies are somewhat larger than in the eastern part.

The thorax is slaty gray dorsally, with two dark elongated spots (hence the common name) on the latero-ventral surface. The eyes are blue in males, while in the females they are always brown. The abdomen is greyish to blackish with bronze reflections, the last two segments of the abdomen are pale gray. The wings are clear and transparent. Like other damselflies of the family Lestidae they hold their wings at about 45 degrees to the body when resting. The larvae are light brown and up to 25 millimeters long. The time of flight of the adults ranges from late July to mid-September.

== Distribution ==
This species is widespread throughout North America, in Canada and in the United States except in the southeastern states.

== Habitat ==
This damselfly lives on the banks of permanent and temporary water-filled ponds, on flooded river banks and on slow-moving water, on marshes and on swamps.
