= Lestes eurinus =

- Lestes eurinus male at Sifton Bog, Canada

Conservation status
- Least Concern (IUCN 3.1)

Scientific classification
- Kingdom: Animalia
- Phylum: Arthropoda
- Clade: Pancrustacea
- Class: Insecta
- Order: Odonata
- Suborder: Zygoptera
- Family: Lestidae
- Genus: Lestes
- Species: L. eurinus

Binomial name
- Lestes eurinus Say, 1840

Species of damselfly

Lestes eurinus, the amber-winged spreadwing, is a species of spreadwing in the damselfly family Lestidae. It is found in eastern North America.

The IUCN conservation status of Lestes eurinus is "LC", least concern, with no immediate threat to the species' survival. The population is stable. The IUCN status was reviewed in 2017.

== Gallery ==
Male, Ontario

Female, Ontario

Male and female

Pterostigma close-up
