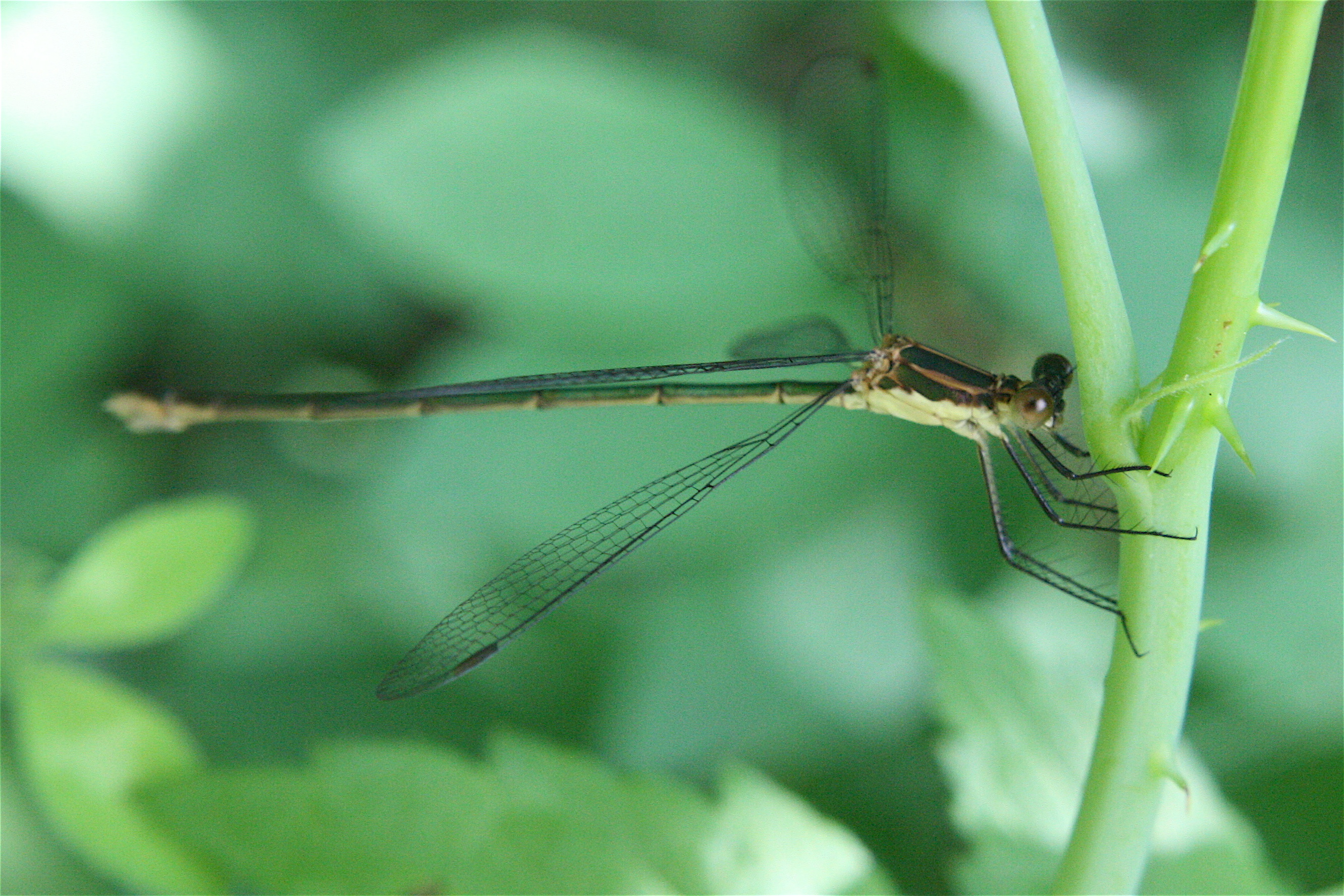
- L. vigilax at Fort Custer in Augusta, Michigan

Scientific classification
- Kingdom: Animalia
- Phylum: Arthropoda
- Class: Insecta
- Order: Odonata
- Suborder: Zygoptera
- Family: Lestidae
- Genus: Lestes
- Species: L. vigilax

Binomial name
- Lestes vigilax Sélys (1862)

= Lestes vigilax =

Species of damselfly

Lestes vigilax, the swamp spreadwing, is a damselfly of the genus Lestes. It grows between 42 and 55 mm long. It ranges from eastern North America west to Minnesota, Oklahoma, and Texas, south to Georgia and South Carolina, and north through southern Ontario. It is most commonly seen between May and October.
