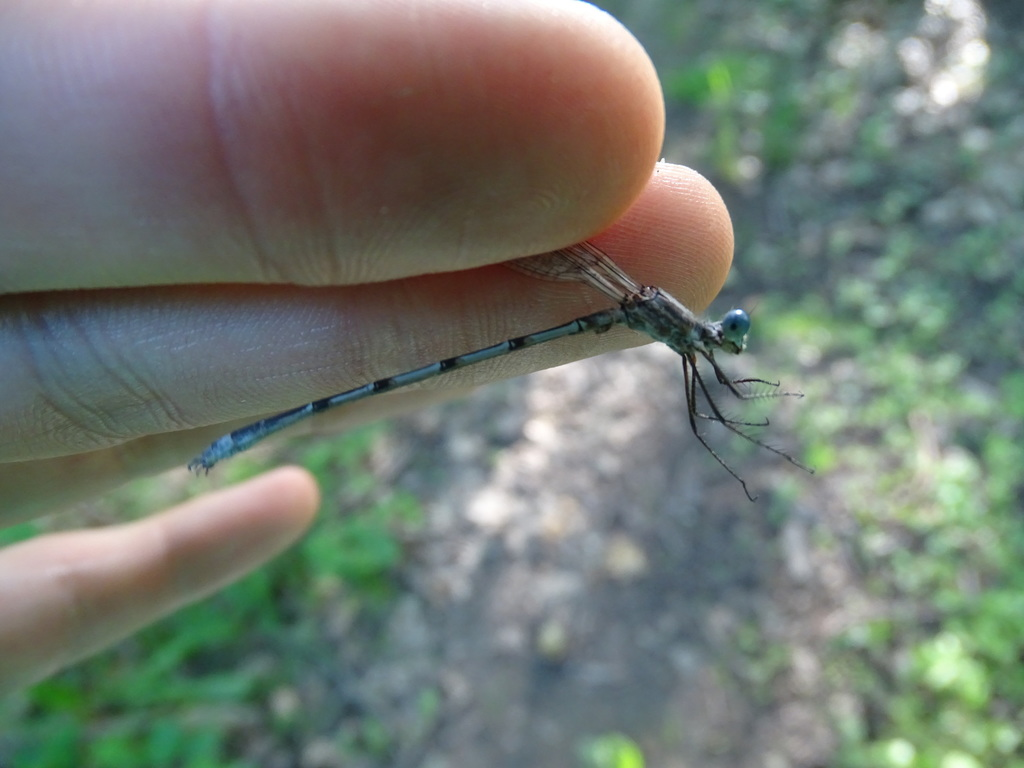

Conservation status
- Least Concern (IUCN 3.1)

Scientific classification
- Kingdom: Animalia
- Phylum: Arthropoda
- Class: Insecta
- Order: Odonata
- Suborder: Zygoptera
- Family: Lestidae
- Genus: Lestes
- Species: L. disjunctus

Binomial name
- Lestes disjunctus Selys, 1862

= Lestes disjunctus =

Species of damselfly

Lestes disjunctus, the northern spreadwing, is a species of spreadwing in the damselfly family Lestidae. It is found in North America.

The IUCN conservation status of Lestes disjunctus is "LC", least concern, with no immediate threat to the species' survival. The population is stable. The IUCN status was reviewed in 2017.
