= Veerankutty =

Indian poet (born 1962)

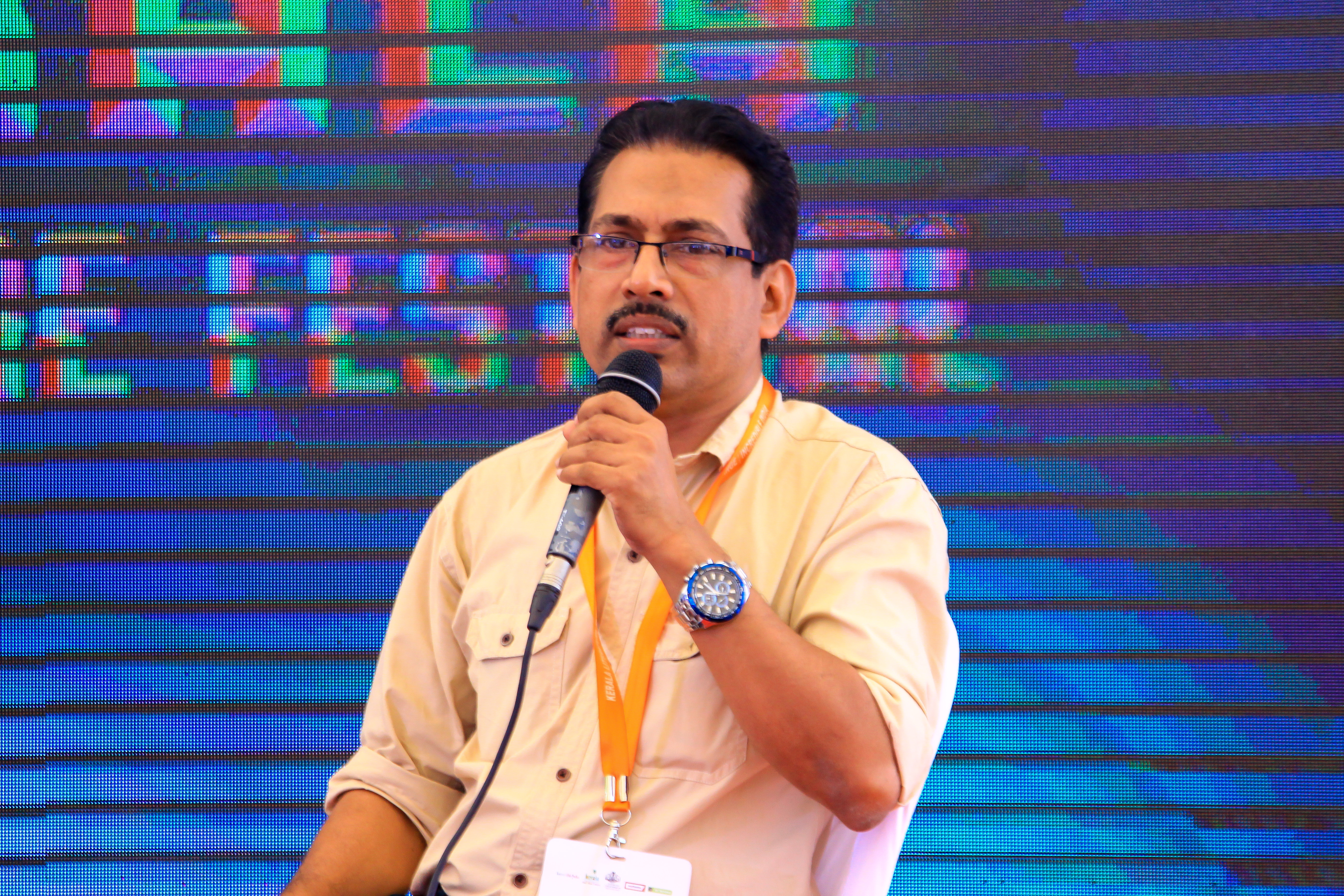
- Veerankutty
- Born: 9 July 1962 (age 64); Narayamkulam, Kozhikode now lives at chemmarathur, Vatakara, Kozhikkode, Kerala, India
- Education: Master of Arts
- Occupations: Associate Professor, Govt College Madappally

Veerankutty is a Malayalam poet and former associate professor in Dept of Malayalam Govt College Madappally. He was born in Narayamkulam near Perambra in Kozhikode District, Kerala, India. Veerankutty worked as Head of Malayalam Department at MEASS College Areacode.

His poems were translated to English, German, Tamil, Kannada, Marathi and Hindi languages. The English translation was by Mr Sachidananthan, Dr. K.M Shareef and Prof. Zahira Rahman and was published in Indian Literature, Poetry International web magazine and Malayalam Literary survey. His poems are included in Kannur University, Kerala University Calicut University and Mahatma Gandhi University Text Books. His poems were also included in 3rd and 8th Std Malayalam text Books prepared by SCRT Govt. of Kerala. A German translation of his poem is in Swiss Radio.

== Awards ==
Veerankutty was awarded the K. S. K Thalikkulam award for his poetry collection 'Jalabhoopadam' in 2001. He also received various other awards like the S.B.T Award, Tamil Nadu C.T.M.A Sahithya PuraskaramCherusseri Sahithya Puraskaram, Abudabi Harithakshara Puraskaaram and V T Kumaran Kavya Puraskaram. He also won Mahakavi P Kunjiraman Nair Kavitha Puraskaaram, and Ayanam A Ayyappan puraskaram in 2016 and Dubai Galleria Literary award in 2017 for his anthology 'Veerankuttiyute kavithakal'. His anthology, Mindaprani was selected for the 2017 Kerala Sahitya Akademi Award for Poetry.

== Published works ==
Anthology of Poems

1. Jhala Bhoopatam, Published by Pappiyon Kozhikode, 2001.
2. Manthrikan, Published by DC Books, Kottayam, 2004.
3. Autograph, Published by DC Books, Kottayam, 2007.
4. Manveeru, Published by DC Books, Kottayam, 2011.
5. Thottu Thottu Nadakkumbol(SMS poems), Published by Small Letters, Kozhikode, 2010.
6. Veerankuttiyute kavithakal, published by DC Books, Kottayam, 2013
7. Always in bloom(English)Sanbun Publishers Delhi 2013
8. Mindaprani, Published by DC Books, Kottayam, 2015.
9. A Stroll Grazing Each Other(English)With Ullas R Koya DC Books, Kottayam 2016
10. Nissabdathayude Republic, published by DC Books, Kottayam, 2018
11. The Heaviness Of The Rain (English translation by Ministhy S Nair)Nageen Prakasan, Meerut 2018

Children's’ literature

1. Undanum noolanum, Published by DC Books, Kottayam.
2. Nalumanippoovu, Published by DC Books, Kottayam.
3. Kunjan puli kunjan muyalaya katha by DC Books Kottayam.
4. Parannu Parannu Chekkuttippaava DC Books Kottayam 2018

Memoirs

1. Mazhathullikal vacha Ummakal, eye books kozhikode, 2017
2. Prakruthi Pranayam Prathirodham- Interview-Eye Books Kozhikode 2017
