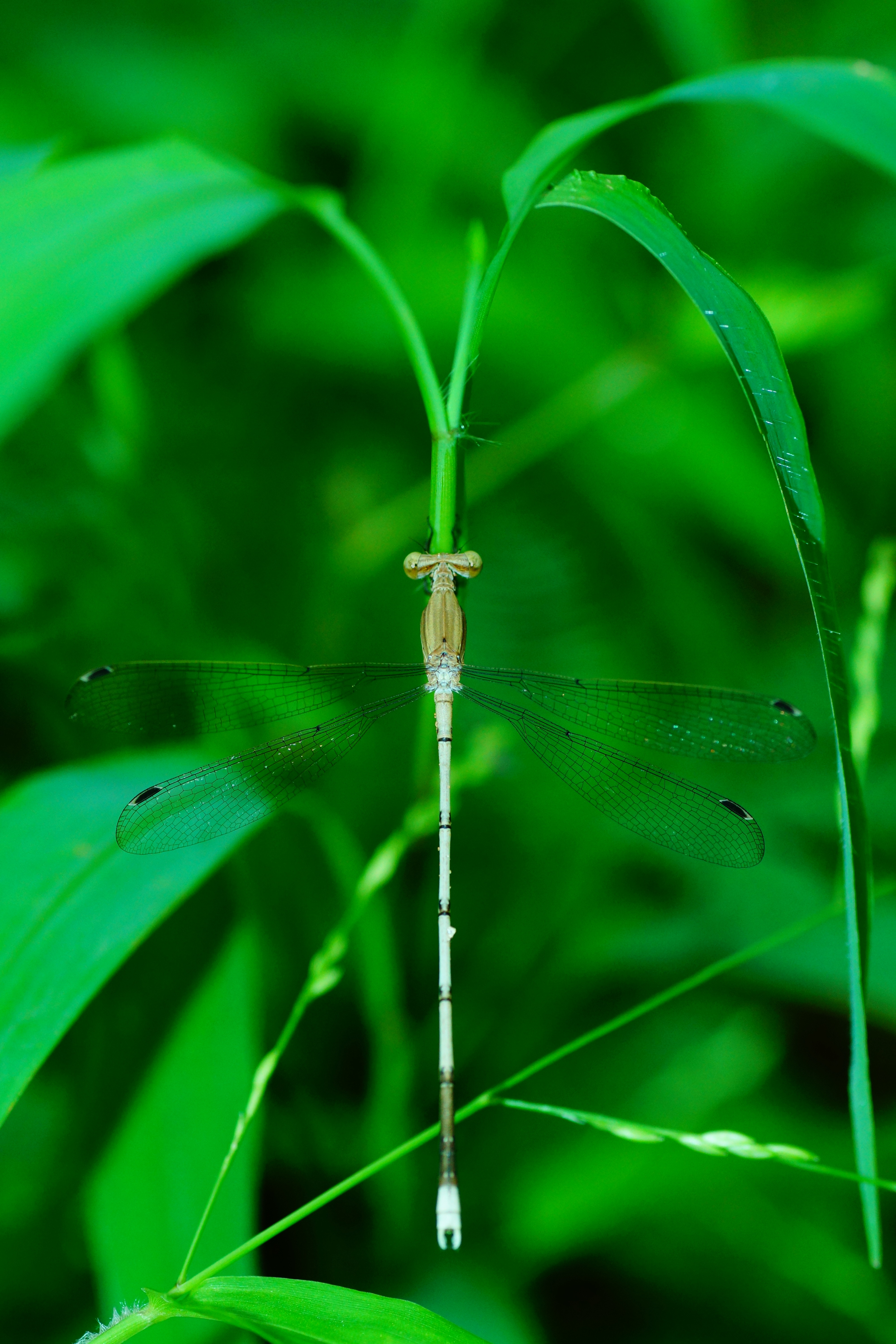
- Male
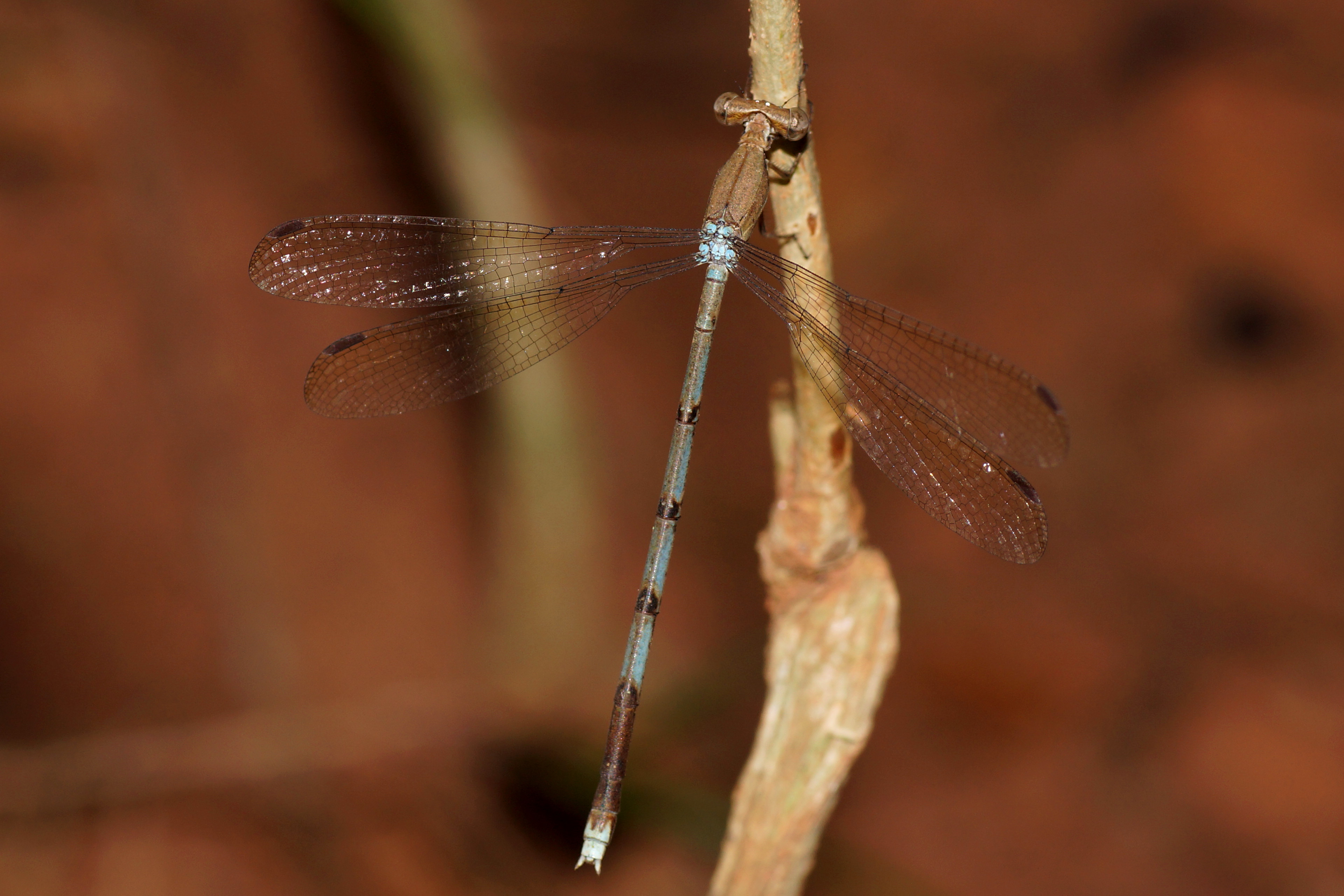
- Female

Conservation status
- Least Concern (IUCN 3.1)

Scientific classification
- Kingdom: Animalia
- Phylum: Arthropoda
- Class: Insecta
- Order: Odonata
- Suborder: Zygoptera
- Family: Lestidae
- Genus: Lestes
- Species: L. nodalis

Binomial name
- Lestes nodalis Selys, 1891

= Lestes nodalis =

Species of damselfly

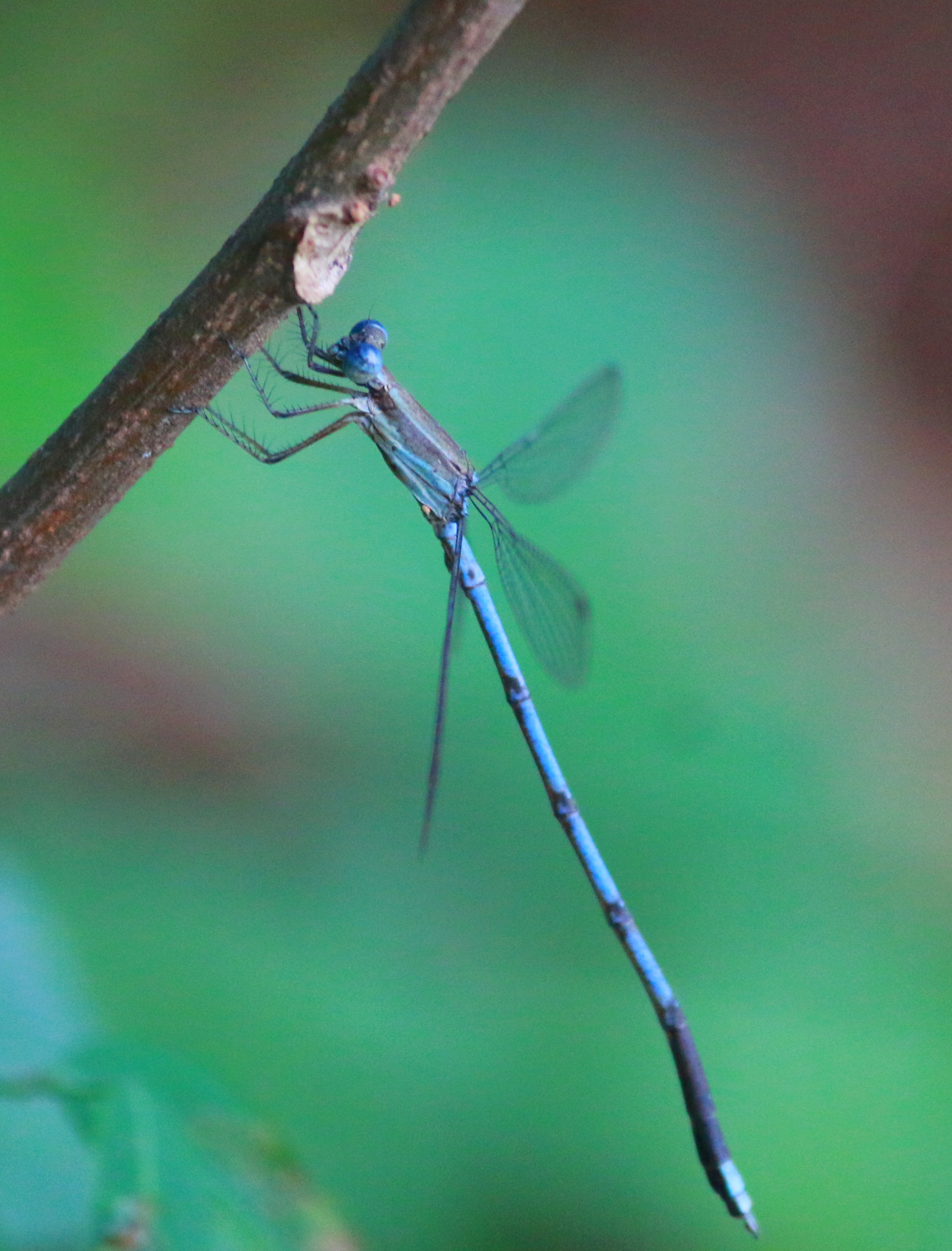
Lestes nodalis male, Wandering Spreadwing, Koottanad, Palakkad

Lestes nodalis is a species of damselfly in the family Lestidae, the spreadwings.

== Distribution ==
It is native to India, Thailand and China.

According to Fraser (1933), the distribution in India is limited to Northeast India, mainly in Assam. Later Mitra (2010) recorded it from Odisha, Bihar and Manipur. Ashish Tiple (2014) recorded it from Maharastra. In 2011, K.G. Emiliyamma and Muhamed Jafer Palot found both a male and female at Narayamkulam, Kozhikode in Kerala. This conforms the range of distribution of this species extends to South India too.

== Description and habitat ==
It is a medium sized damselfly with brown eyes. Its thorax is brown on dorsum and paler on lateral sides. Wings are transparent with bi-colored pterostigma, blackish-brown at centre and yellow along the sides. Its abdomen is brown with black apical annules up to segment 6. Segment 7 and 8 are dark brown. Segment 9, 10 and anal appendages are pale; bluish when aged. The pale colors on the thorax and abdomen are also get bluish due to pruinescence when aged. Female is similar to the male. Its dull colours may render it very inconspicuous, so that it can be easily overlooked. The bi-colored pterostigma and the broad right-angled anal appendages easily help to distinguish it from other species.

It breeds in shallow marshes and possibly well vegetated ponds.

== See also ==
- List of odonates of India
- List of odonata of Kerala
