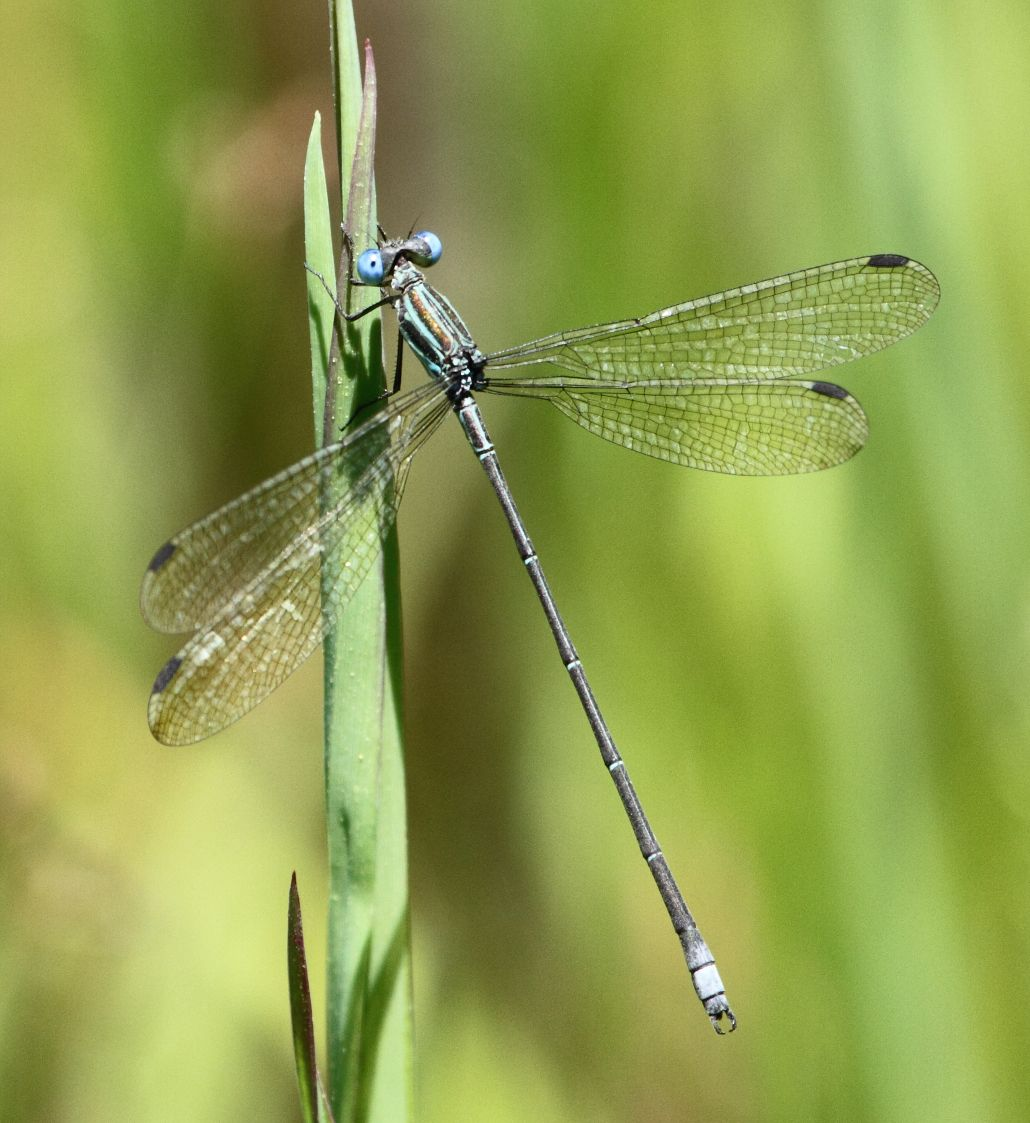
- Male

Conservation status
- Least Concern (IUCN 3.1)

Scientific classification
- Kingdom: Animalia
- Phylum: Arthropoda
- Clade: Pancrustacea
- Class: Insecta
- Order: Odonata
- Suborder: Zygoptera
- Family: Lestidae
- Genus: Lestes
- Species: L. virgatus

Binomial name
- Lestes virgatus (Burmeister, 1839)

Synonyms
- Africalestes virgatus (Burmeister, 1839); Agrion virgatum Burmeister, 1839; Lestes rothschildi Martin, 1906

= Lestes virgatus =

Species of damselfly

Lestes virgatus is a species of damselfly in the family Lestidae, the spreadwings. It is known commonly as the smoky spreadwing. It is native to much of southeastern Africa, where it is widespread. It lives in pools and swamps in forest and woodland habitat.

== Taxonomy ==
Lestes virgatus is a damselfly classified in the family Lestidae, known as the spreadwings. The species was first scientifically described by German biologist Hermann Burmeister in 1839 under the name Agrion virgatum. The type specimen was from Durban. Burmeister included a brief physical account of the species, describing a damselfly about 43 mm (1.7 in) long characterized by four bronzey stripes on its pronotum, an abdomen with a coppery-black (Note: In the original Latin, nigro-aeneo) back. An 1862 publication by odonatologist Edmond de Sélys Longchamps classified the species into the genus Lestes, calling it Lestes virgata; subsequent writers starting with William F. Kirby in 1890 have corrected the gender to Lestes virgatus. (Note: Lestes is feminine, so the neuter virgatum was amended to the feminine virgatus, in compliance with modern ICZN guidance: "A species-group name, if it is or ends in a Latin or latinized adjective or participle in the nominative singular, must agree in gender with the generic name with which it is at any time combined." Article 31.2) The specific epithet is the nominative case of the Latin adjective virgatus, meaning "long and slender" (as a twig or rod, virga) or banded, striped. Despite being sometimes known as the "virginal spreadwing", the species epithet is unrelated from virginity, which is derived from the Latin virgo. (Note: Although some etymology scholars believe that virgo is actually derived from virga (the latter as in "young plant").)

In 1920, Charles Hamilton Kennedy erected the genus Africalestes, with Lestes virgatus as its type species. However, in a 1935 article, South African zoologist Keppel Harcourt Barnard (then assistant director of the South African Museum) rejected the morphological basis of the separation, finding the validity of Kennedy's genus "very doubtful". Elliot Pinhey, in a 1951 book on African Odonata, agreed with Barnard's conclusions, and listed Africalestes as a synonym of Lestes, a synonymy accepted by the World Catalogue of Odonata. The World Catalogue also includes one subjective synonym: Lestes rothschildi, described by René Martin in the early 20th century.

== Description ==
=== Identification ===
Like Lestes amicus, L. virgatus has wide metallic bands on the front part of its thorax. but it can be distinguished from that species by the colouration of its wings, which are either clear or "uniformly yellowish"; the structure of its cerci (upper anal appendages), which on their inward edges have a broad dimple preceding a "stout tooth", and are "coarsely toothed" posteriorly; and the pterostigmata which, at 1.5–2.0 mm, are smaller. L. virgatus is also superficially similar to the equally-sized Lestes plagiatus, but can be again be distinguished by close examination of the cerci, which on L. virgatus curve inwards but are straight on the longitudinal axis (whereas those of L. plagiatus curve downwards), and of the pterostigmata, which in L. virgatus are characteristically convex or "swollen". A diagnostic feature for males is eye colouration: in L. virgatus, bright blue in the upper half and pale grey in the lower with distinctive darker specks.

== Distribution ==
Lestes virgatus is found through inland southeastern Africa from the Choke Mountains of central-western Ethiopia through western Kenya, Uganda, Rwanda, Malawi, Zambia, western Tanzania and the southeastern DRC, Malawi, Zimbabwe, and along the coast of South Africa as far west as Cape Town.

== Gallery ==
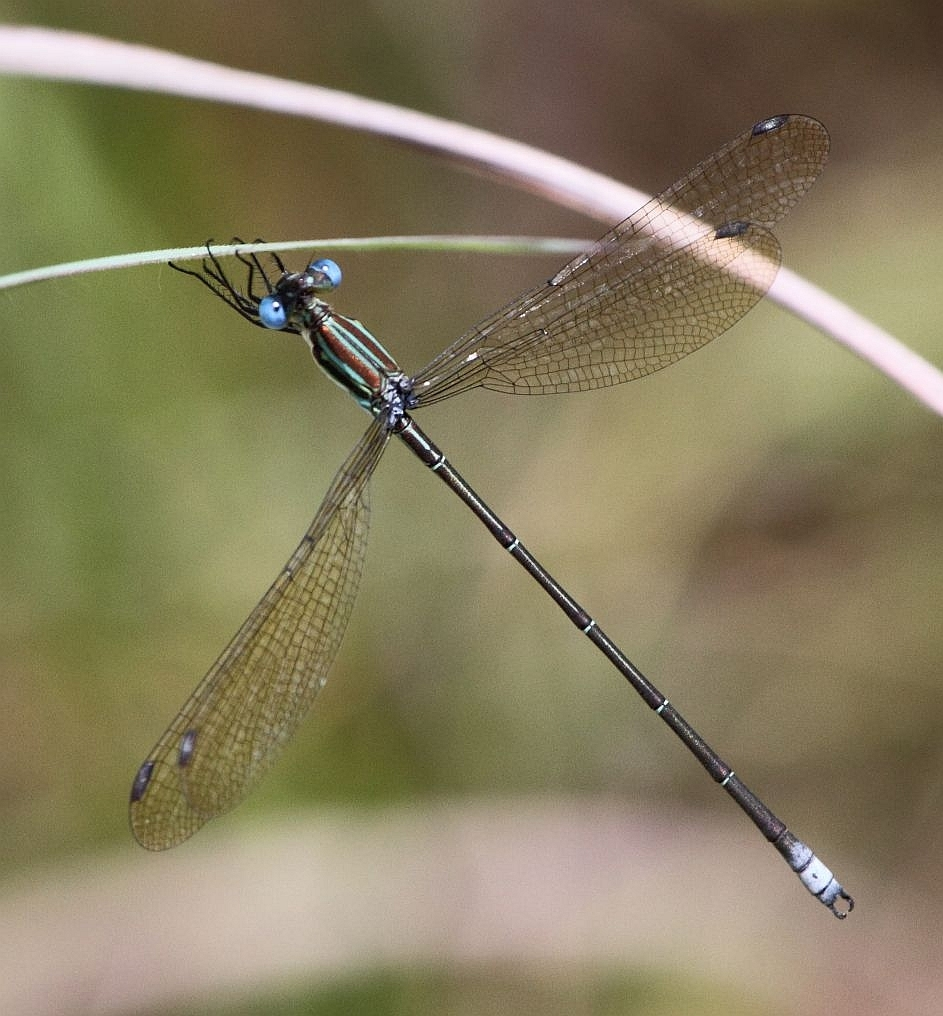
Male

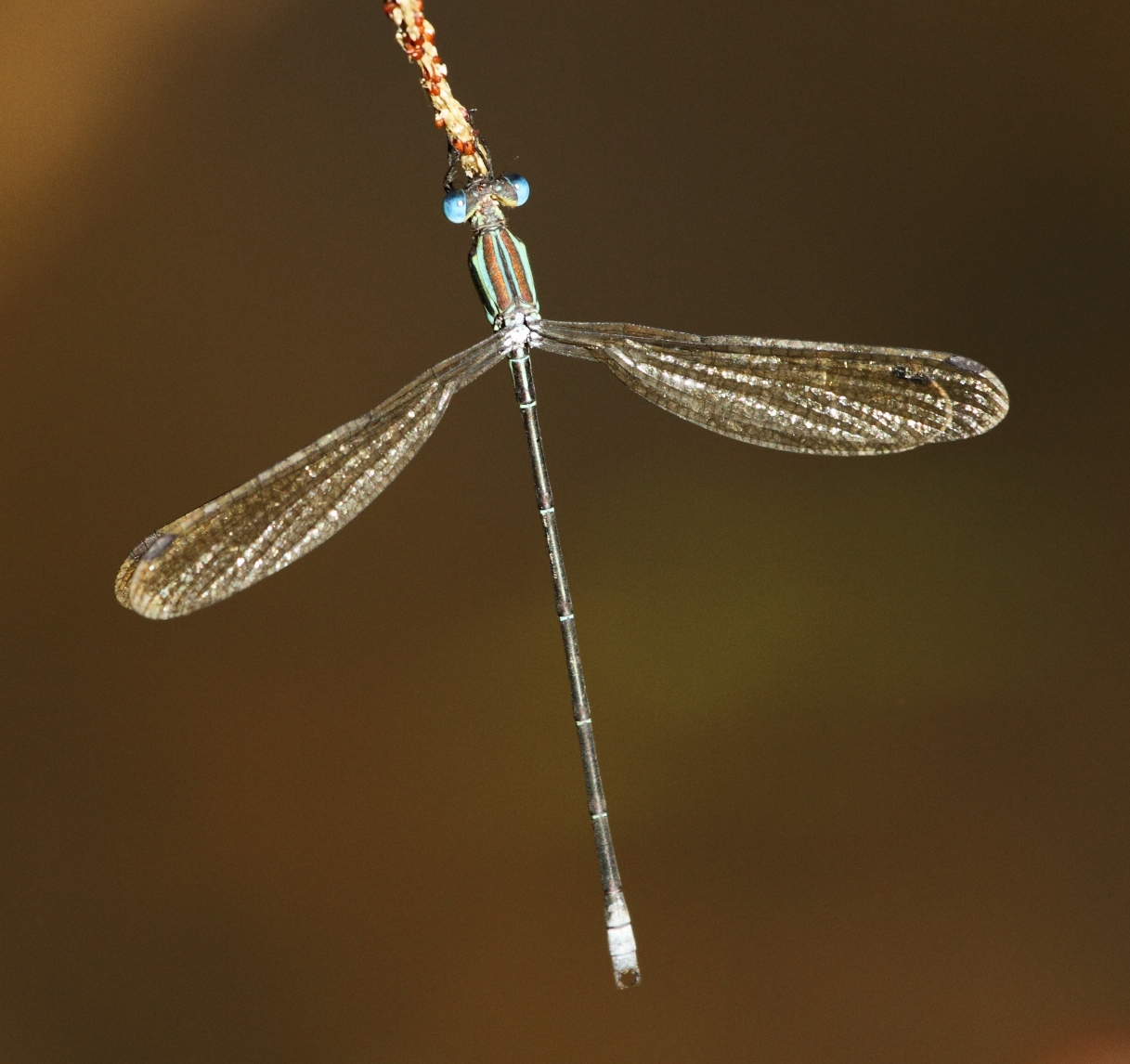
Male

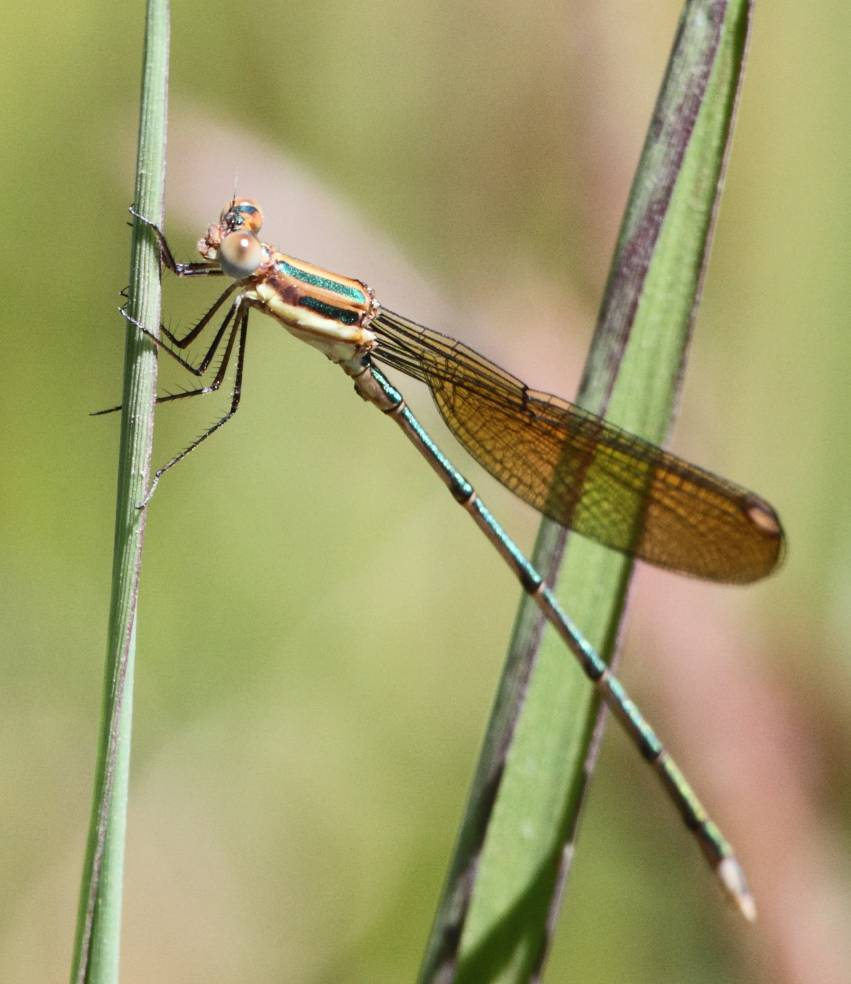
Teneral male

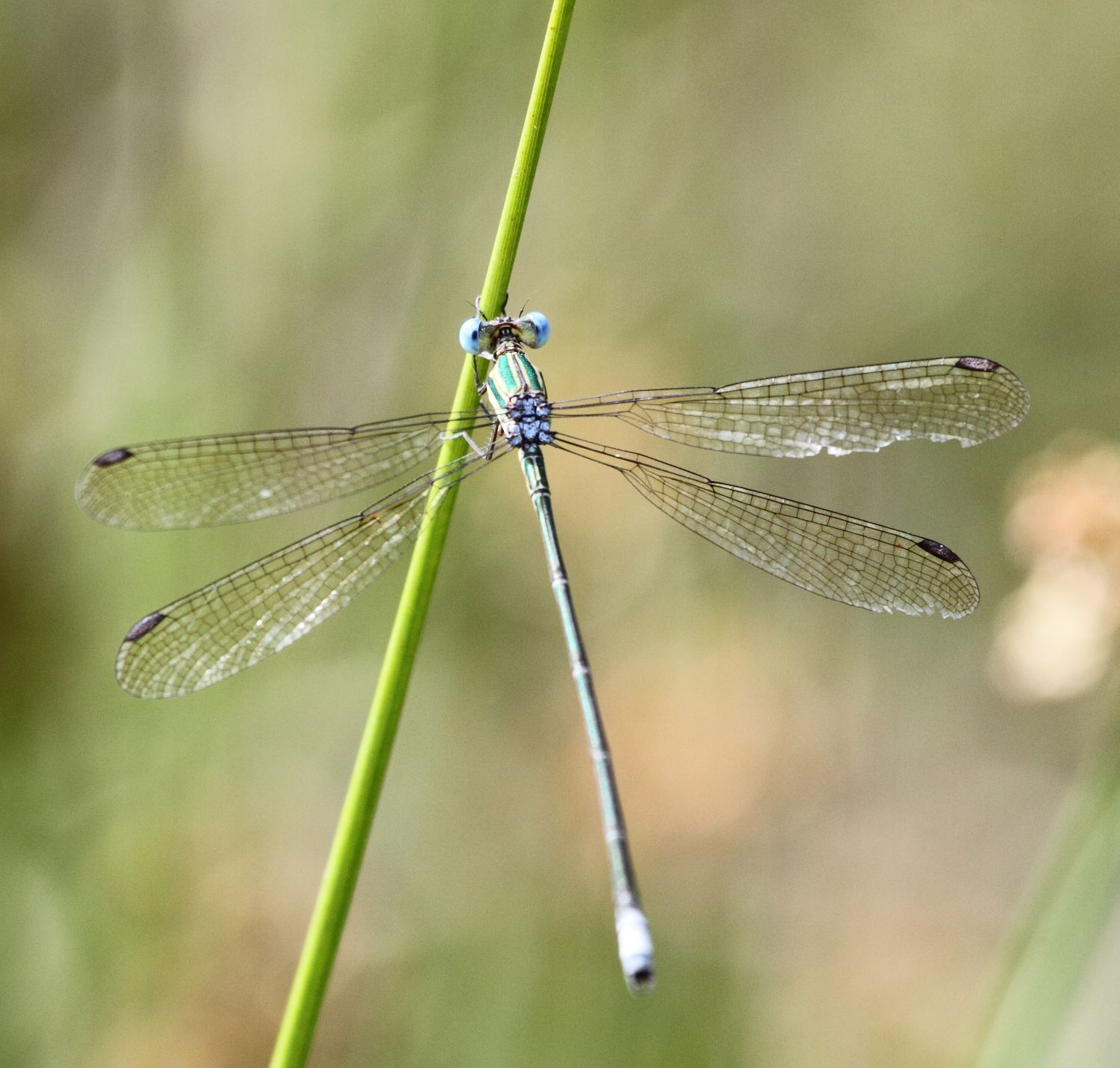
female
