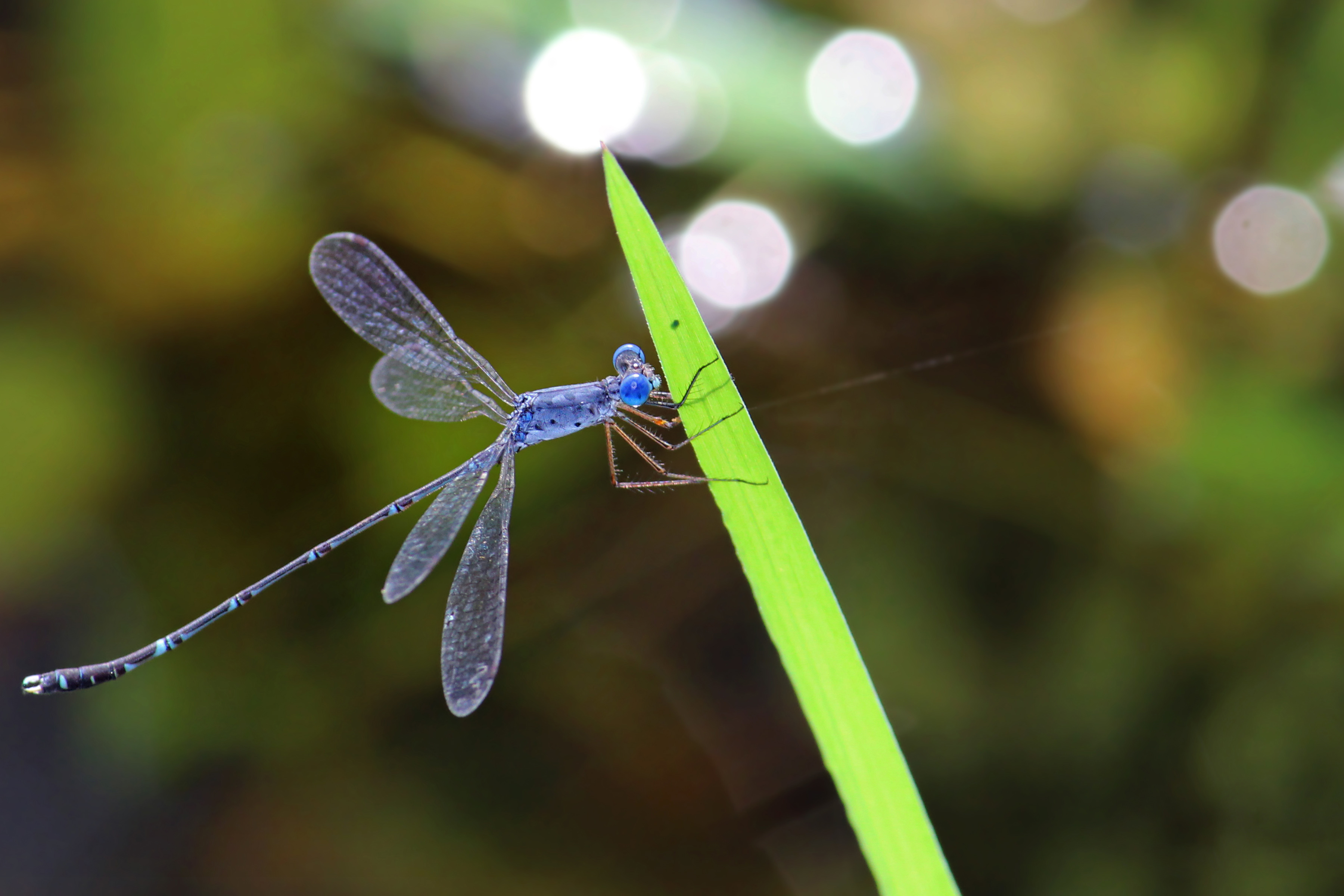
- male

Conservation status
- Least Concern (IUCN 3.1)

Scientific classification
- Kingdom: Animalia
- Phylum: Arthropoda
- Clade: Pancrustacea
- Class: Insecta
- Order: Odonata
- Suborder: Zygoptera
- Family: Lestidae
- Genus: Lestes
- Species: L. praemorsus

Binomial name
- Lestes praemorsus Hagen in Selys, 1862

Synonyms
- Platylestes praemorsus (Hagen in Selys, 1862); Lestes decipiens Kirby, 1890

= Lestes praemorsus =

Species of damselfly

Lestes praemorsus is a damselfly species in the family Lestidae. It is commonly known as the scalloped spreadwing or sapphire-eyed spreadwing. It is very widely distributed from India to China and south to New Guinea.

== Description and habitat ==
It is a medium-sized damselfly with the male have an abdomen length 32 to 35 mm compared to the similar looking species, Lestes dorothea having an abdomen length 36–40 mm. Its head is black and matured males have deep sapphire-blue eyes as in L. dorothea. Its thorax is black, pruinosed white laterally, yellowish beneath. The dorsum of the thorax is marked with a pair of metallic green antehumeral stripes shaped like those seen in L. dorothea. There are several irregular spots present on both sides. The thorax of matured males are heavily pruinosed, obscuring all these markings. Abdomen is blue marked with black on dorsum. Segments 2 to 7 have very narrow bluish basal rings. Segment 8 has a thin apico-lateral blue spot. Segment 9 has a very large lateral spot of blue on each side which may get pruinosed to form an apical ring in adults. Segment 10 also has a blue spot on each side, get pruinosed to form an apical ring in adults. Anal appendages are pale yellow with black on apices. Female is similar to the male with pale yellowish green colors.

It breeds in well vegetated ponds, marshes and lakes. This damselfly can be found quite commonly in shaded lowland swamps and drains.

== See also ==
- List of odonates of India
- List of odonata of Kerala
