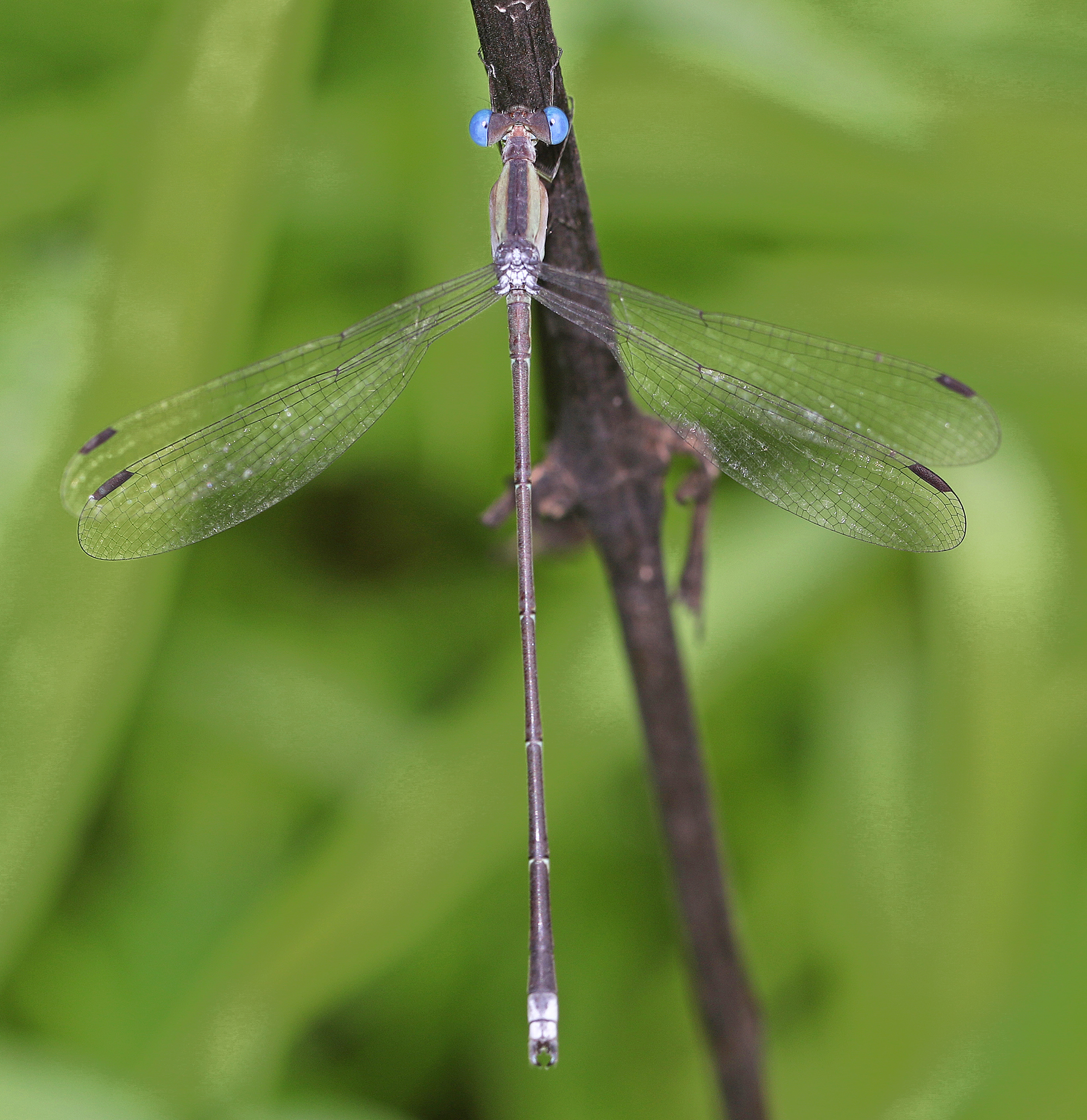
- Male from Satara district, Maharashtra

Scientific classification
- Kingdom: Animalia
- Phylum: Arthropoda
- Class: Insecta
- Order: Odonata
- Suborder: Zygoptera
- Family: Lestidae
- Genus: Lestes
- Species: L. patricia

Binomial name
- Lestes patricia Fraser, 1924

= Lestes patricia =

Species of damselfly

Lestes patricia is a species of damselfly in the family Lestidae. It is native to Western Ghats in India.

Fraser described this species from a single male specimen collected from Kodagu district of Karnataka. In 2020, A colony was rediscovered in the Satara district of Maharashtra and specimens are deposited at Bombay Natural History Society for further studies.

== Description and habitat ==
It is a medium sized damselfly with blue eyes. Thorax is bluish green on dorsum, changing to greenish white on the sides. The dorsum of thorax is marked with a pair of broad ante-humeral black stripes with straight borders. There are two pairs of tiny black spots on the lateral sides. Its abdomen is pale bluish green, marked with black. Anal appendages are black. This species can be easily distinguished from other Indian Lestes species by the single mid-dorsal black band with straight borders.

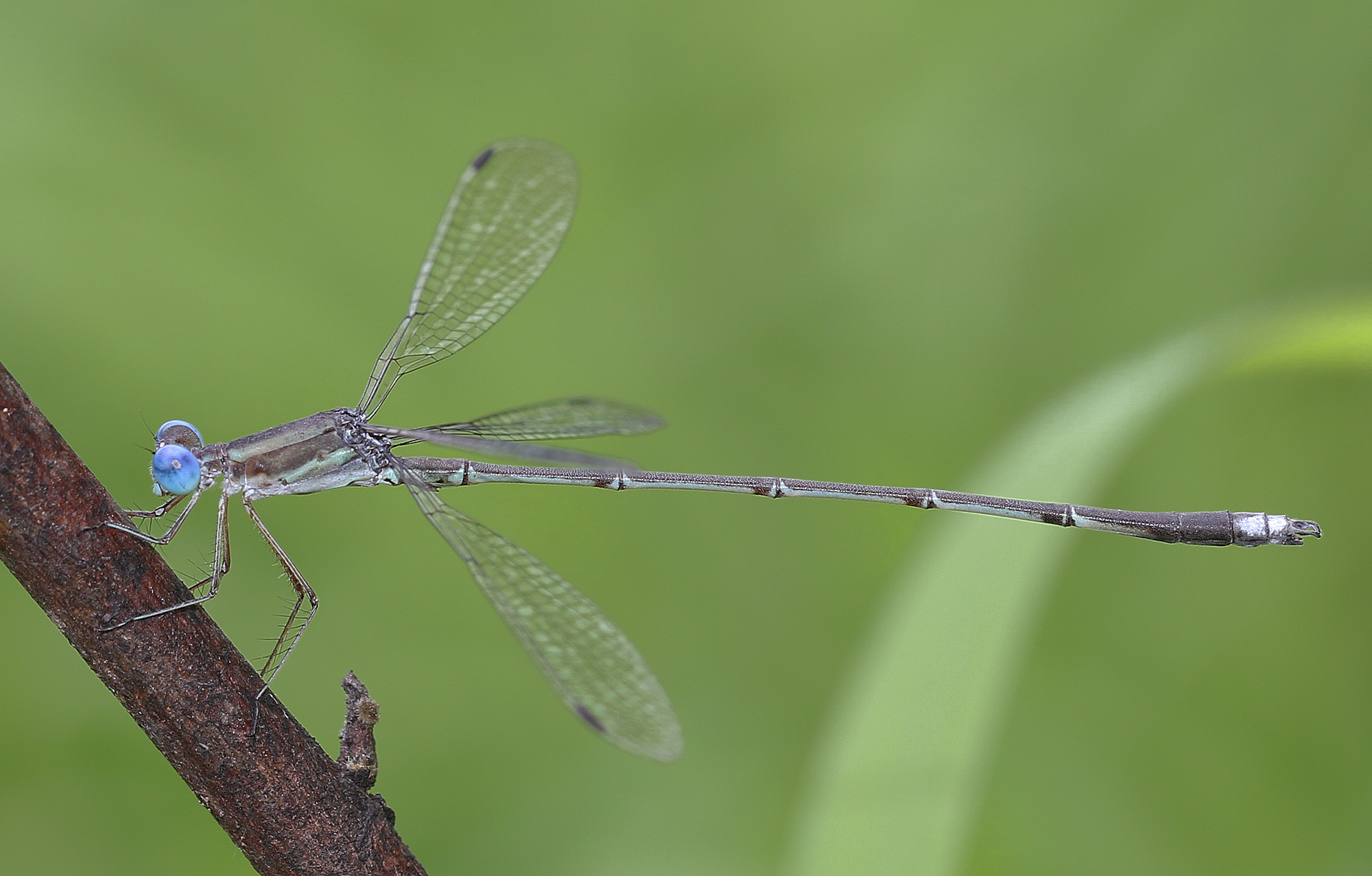
Male (lateral view)

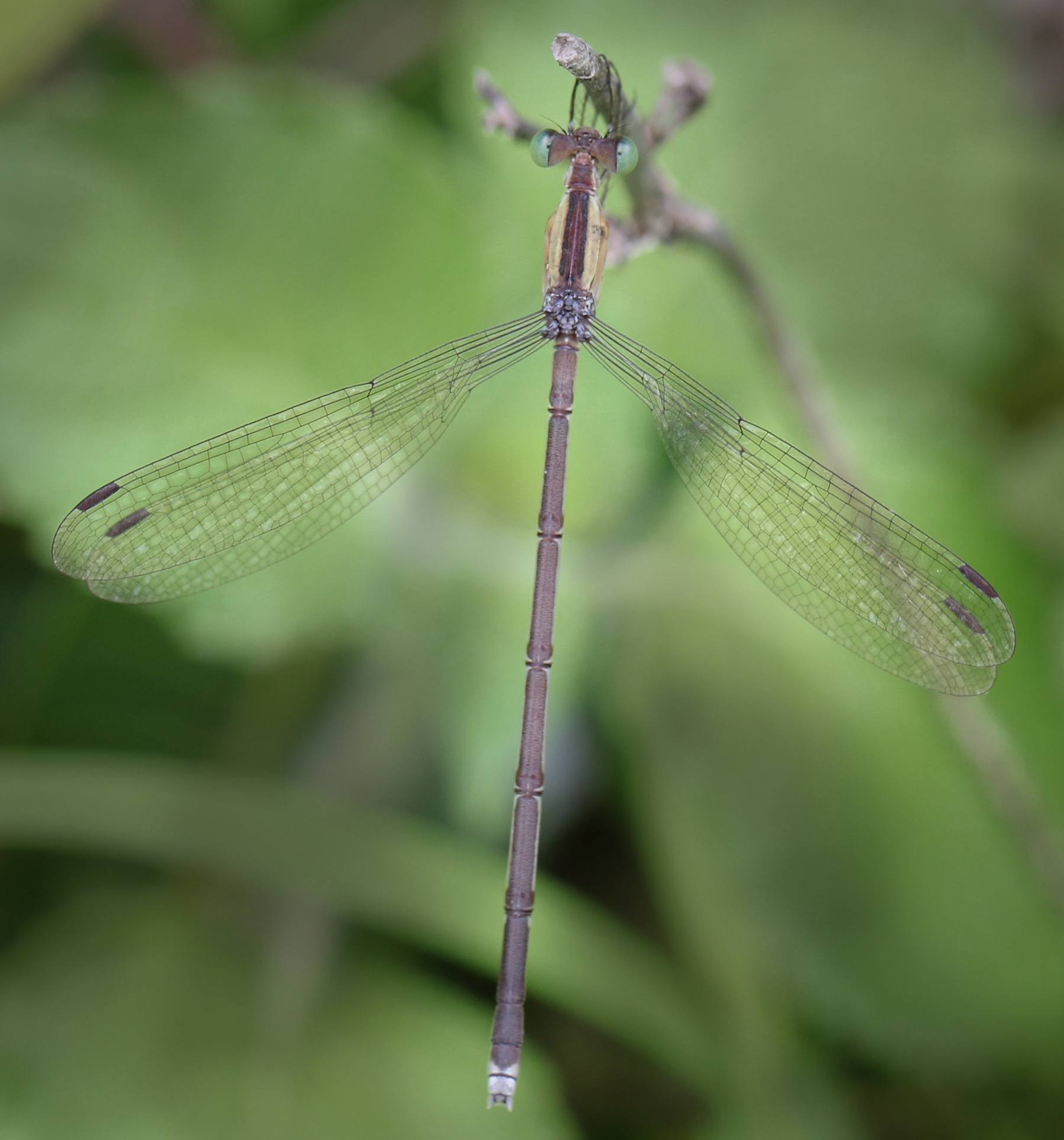
Female (dorsal view)

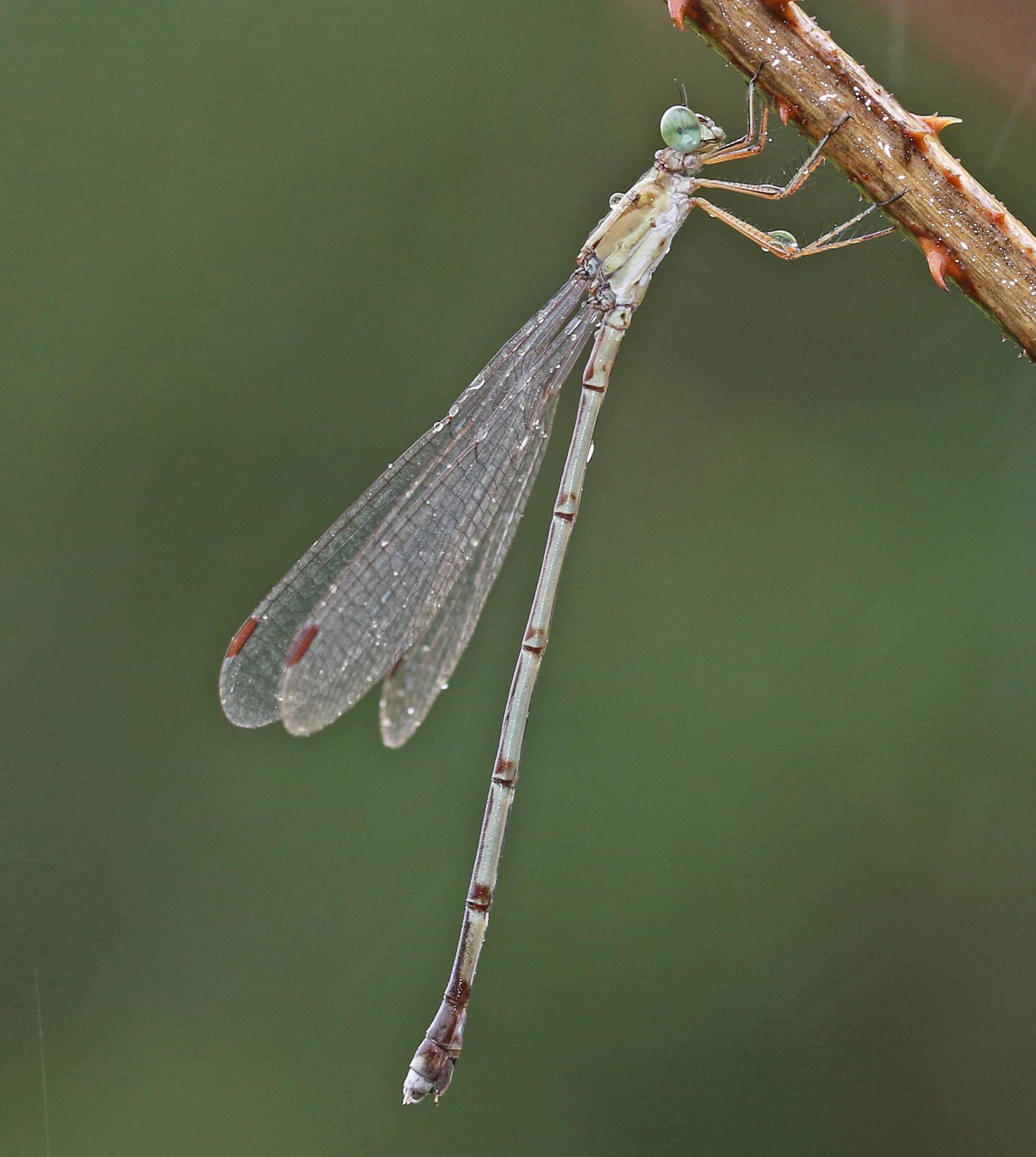
Female (lateral view)

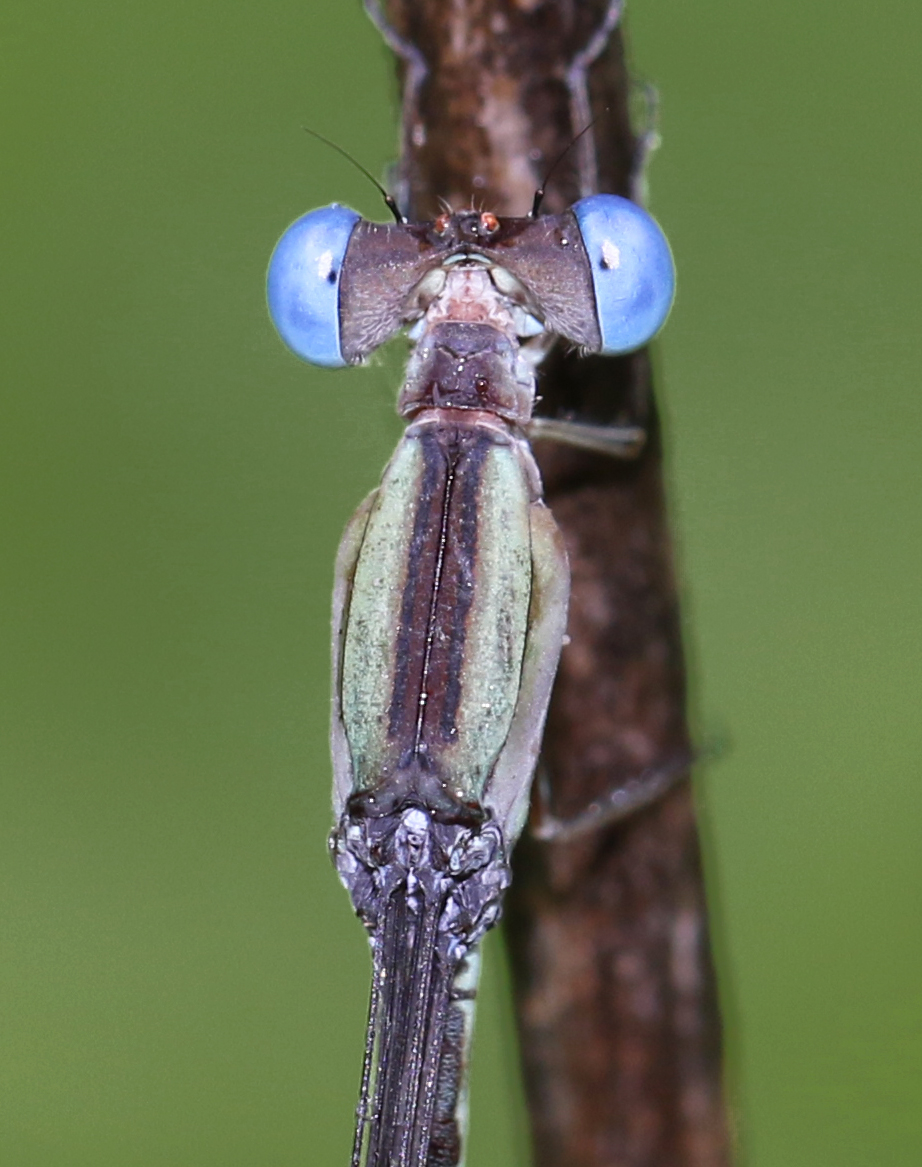
Male (marks on thorax)

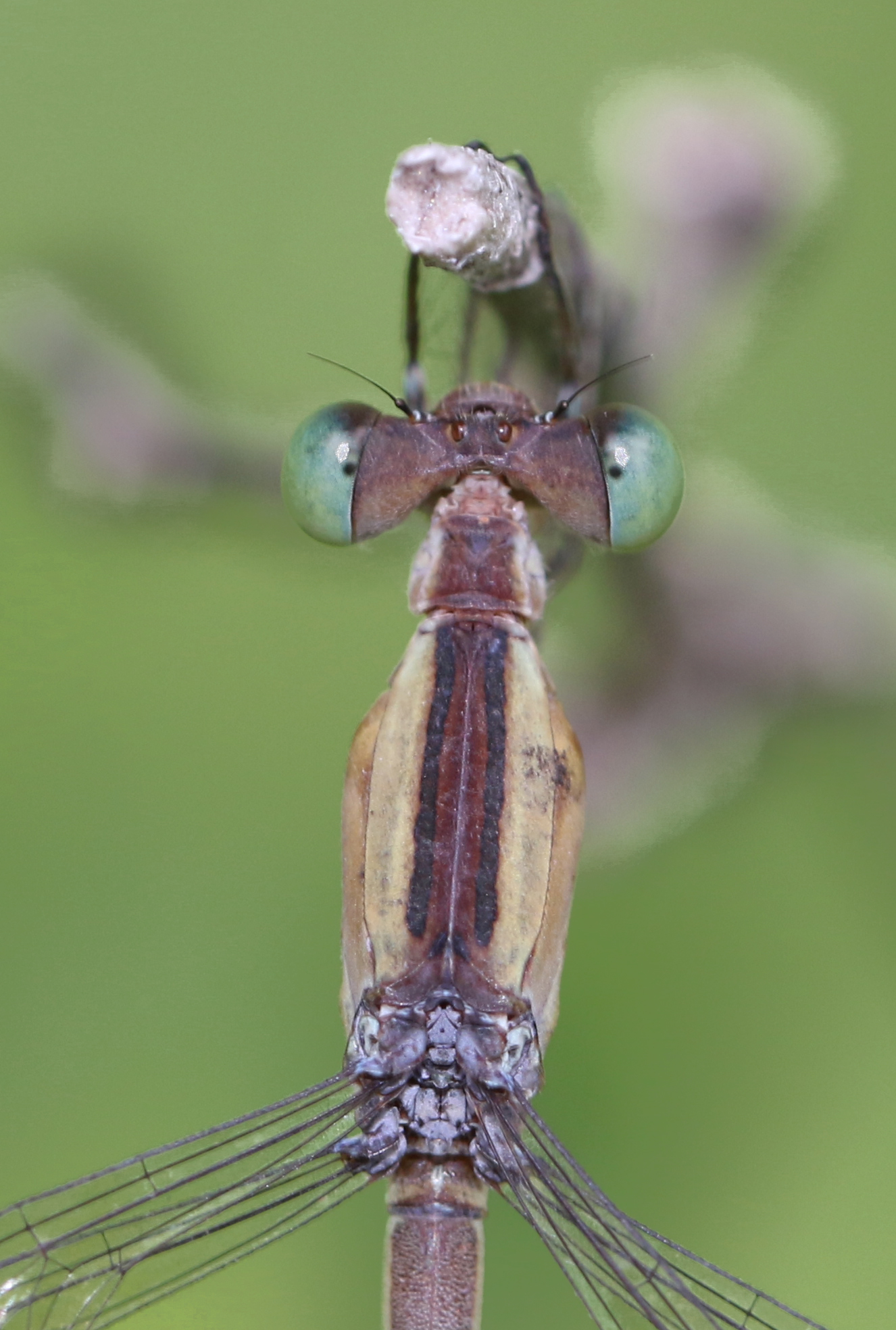
Female (marks on thorax)

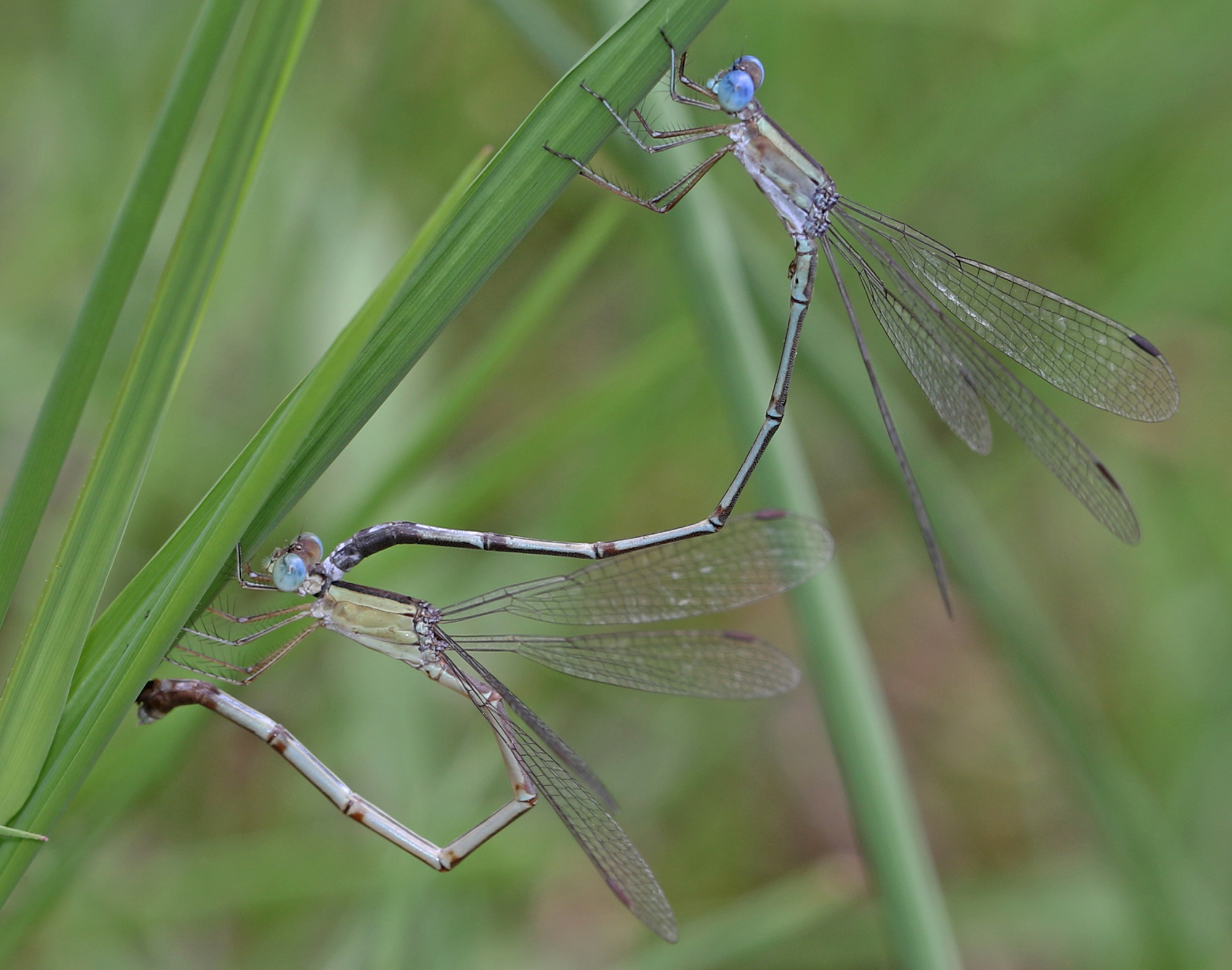
Ovipositing pair

== See also ==
- List of odonates of India
- List of odonata of Kerala
