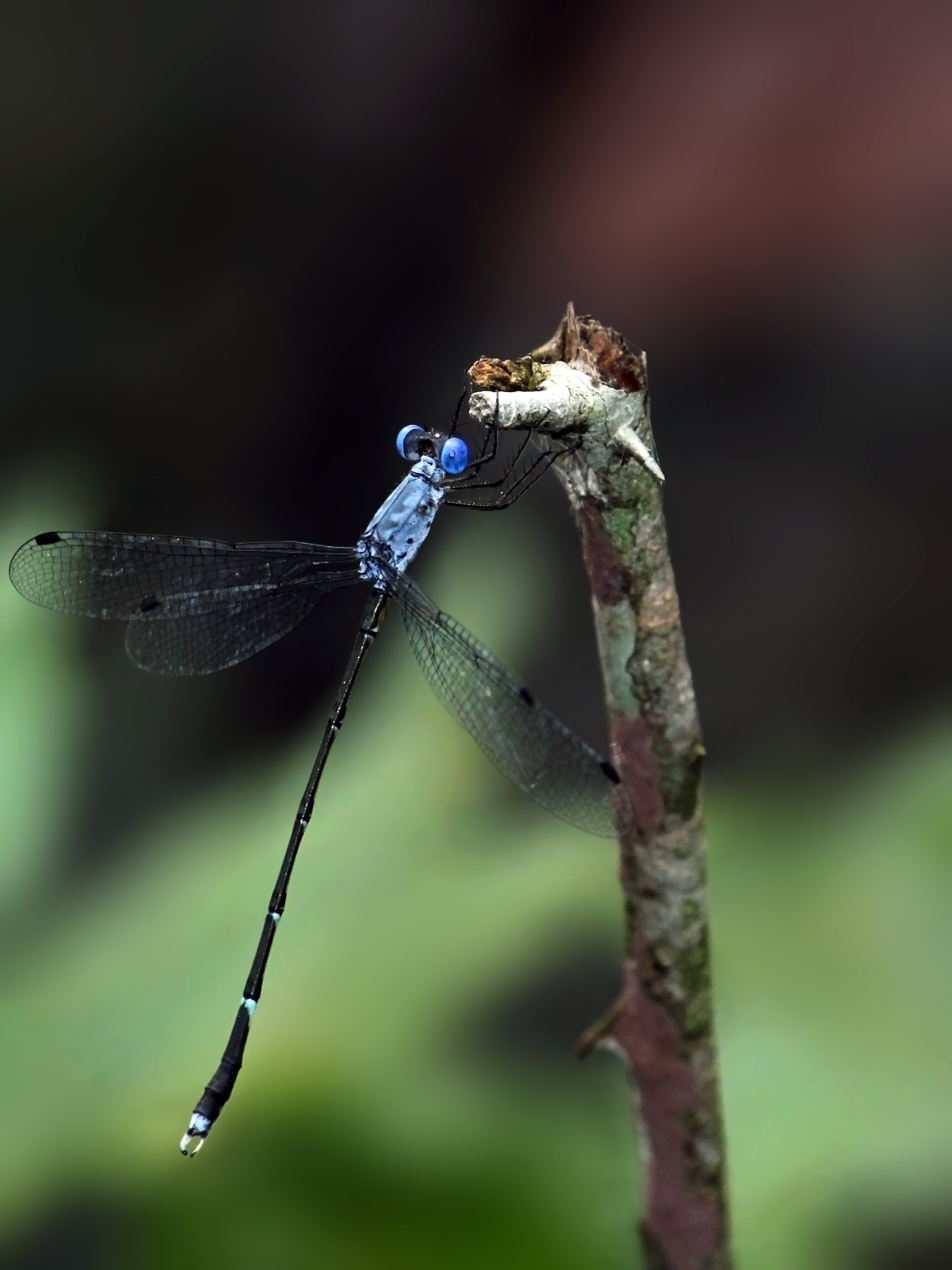
- Male
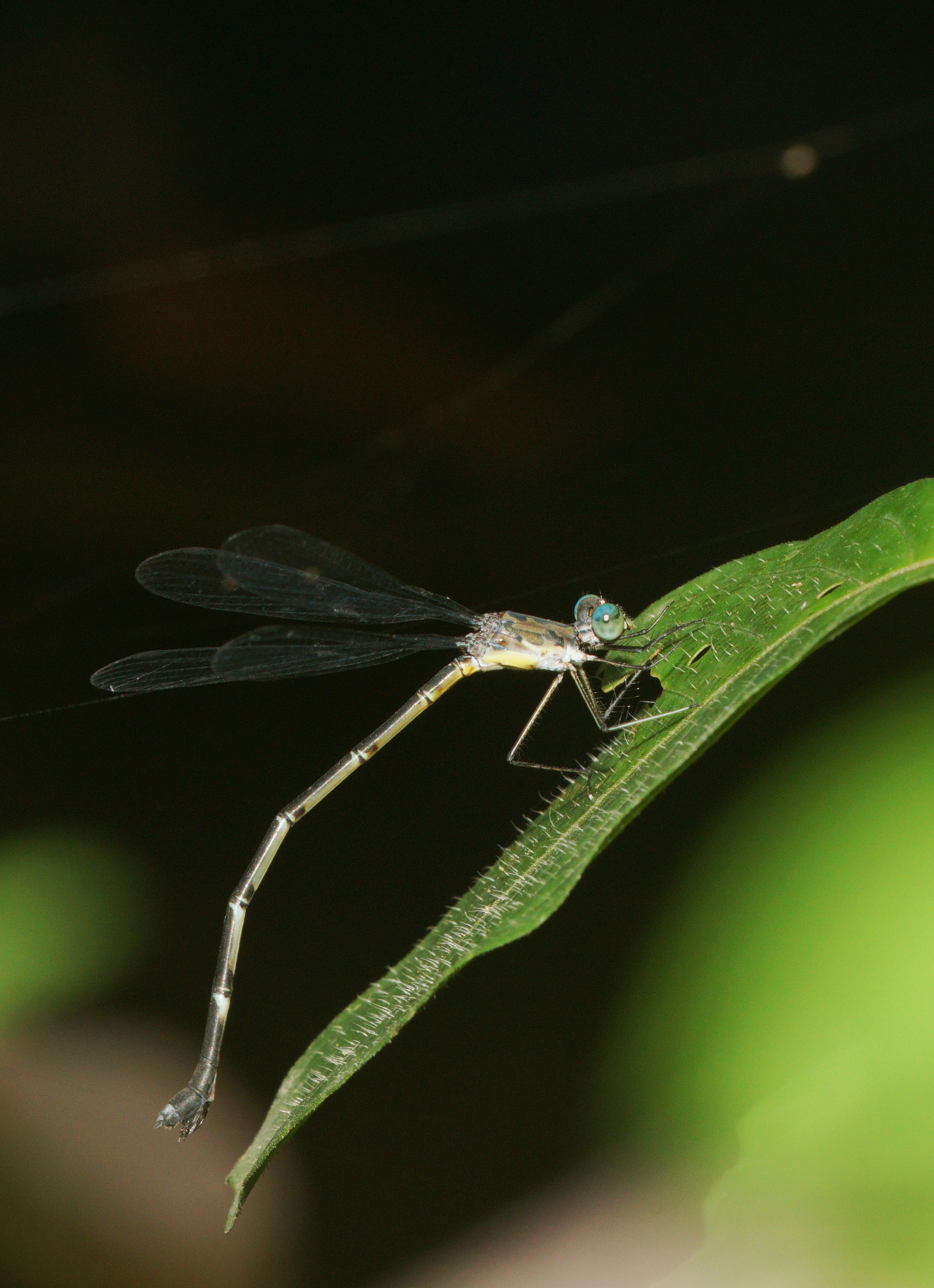
- Female

Conservation status
- Least Concern (IUCN 3.1)

Scientific classification
- Kingdom: Animalia
- Phylum: Arthropoda
- Clade: Pancrustacea
- Class: Insecta
- Order: Odonata
- Suborder: Zygoptera
- Family: Lestidae
- Genus: Lestes
- Species: L. dorothea

Binomial name
- Lestes dorothea Fraser, 1924

= Lestes dorothea =

Species of damselfly

Lestes dorothea, the forest spreadwing, is a damselfly species in the family Lestidae. It is distributed from south and northeast India to Thailand and Malaysia.

== Description and habitat ==
It is a large damselfly with the male have an abdomen length 36 to 40 mm compared to the similar looking species, Lestes praemorsus having an abdomen length 32–35 mm. Its head is black and matured males have deep sapphire-blue eyes as in L. praemorsus. Its thorax is black, pruinosed white laterally, citron-yellow beneath. The dorsum of the thorax is marked with a pair of metallic green antehumeral stripes shaped like those seen in L. praemorsus. The mark on each side is followed by a diffuse black stripe on the humeral suture, a large diffuse black spot just in front of the upper part of the postero-lateral suture, another smaller spot at the middle of the antero-lateral suture, and a third spot over the spiracle. L. praemorsus lacks this black stripe; have only several irregular spots present on both sides. The thorax of matured males are heavily pruinosed, obscuring all these markings. Wings are hyaline and pterostigma is black. Abdomen is blue or greenish-blue marked with black. Segment 8 is with a fine basal blue ring, segments 9 entirely black, and segment 10 is black with pruinosed white on the dorsum. In L. praemorsus, segment 9 has very large lateral spots of blue. Anal appendages are bluish during life, broadly black at base and apex.

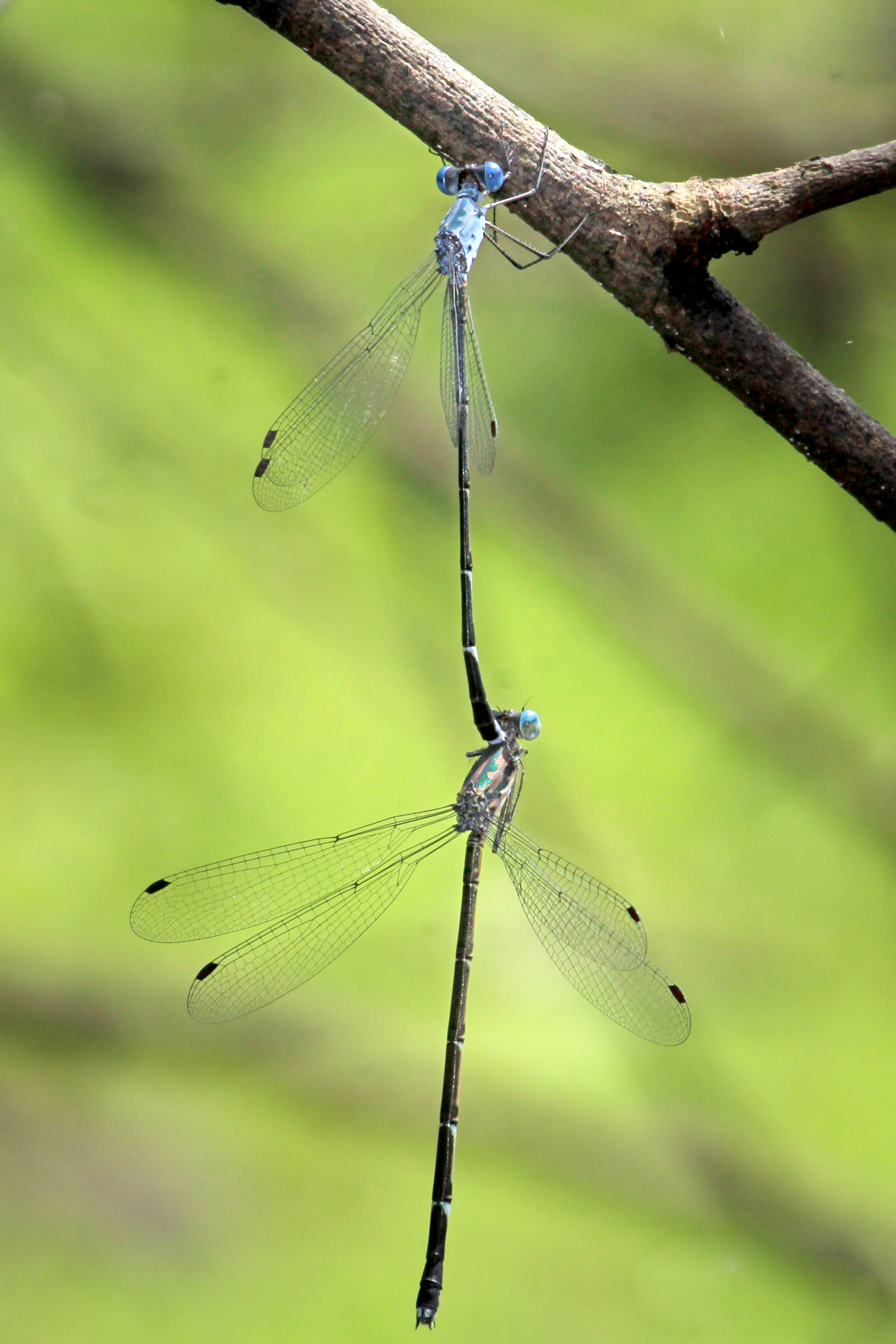
Dorsal view in tandem

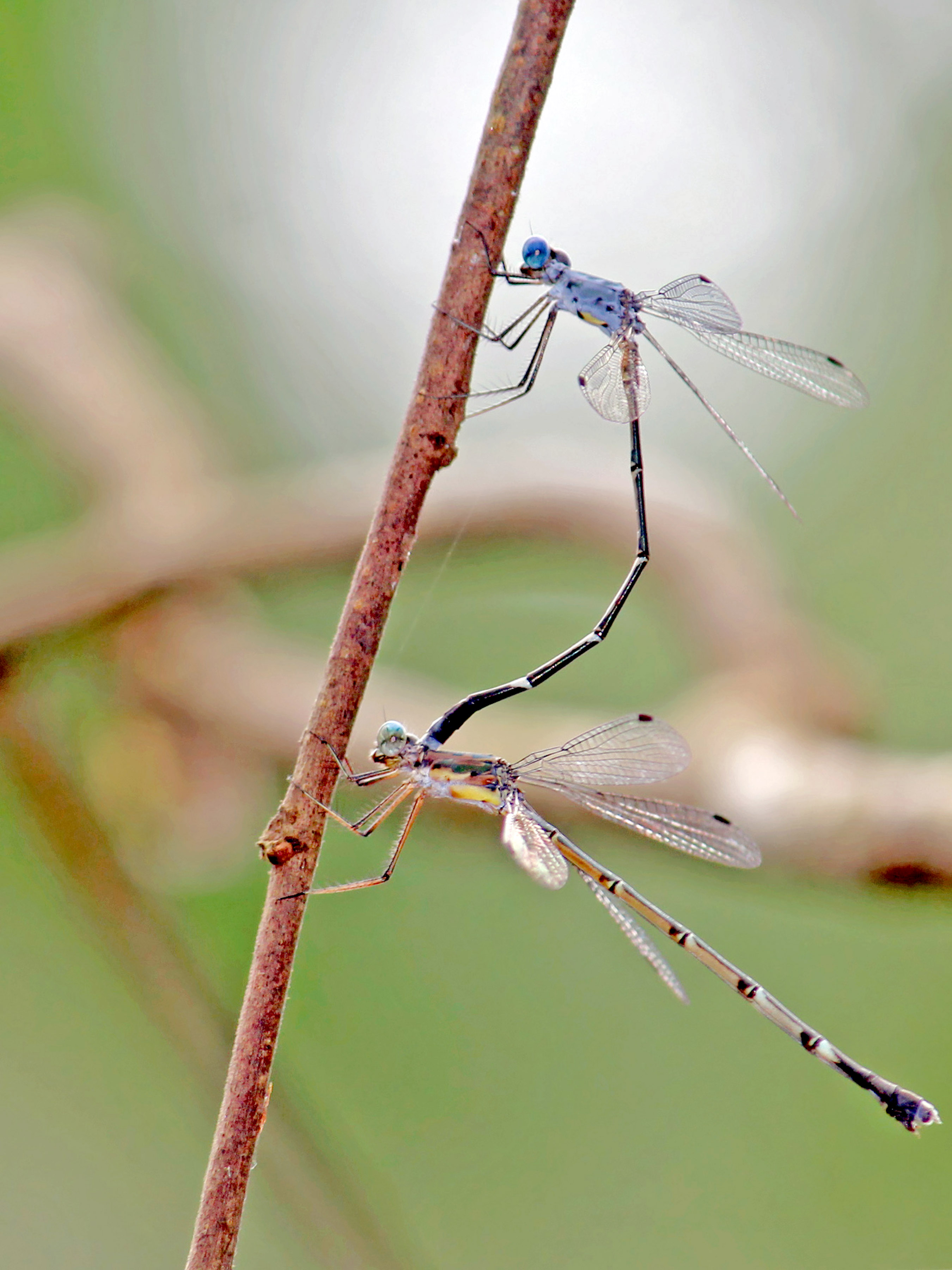
Lateral view in tandem

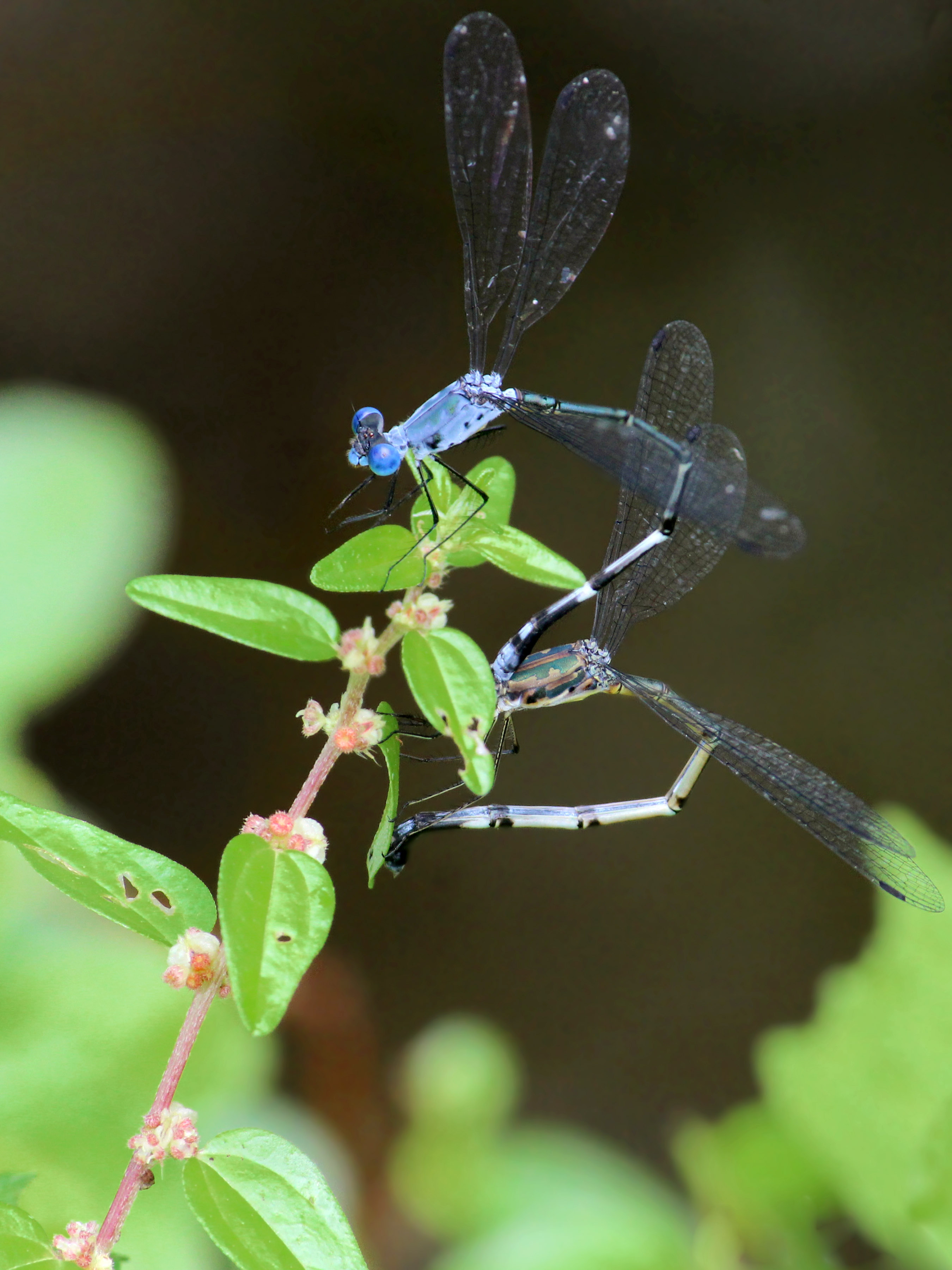
Ovipositing

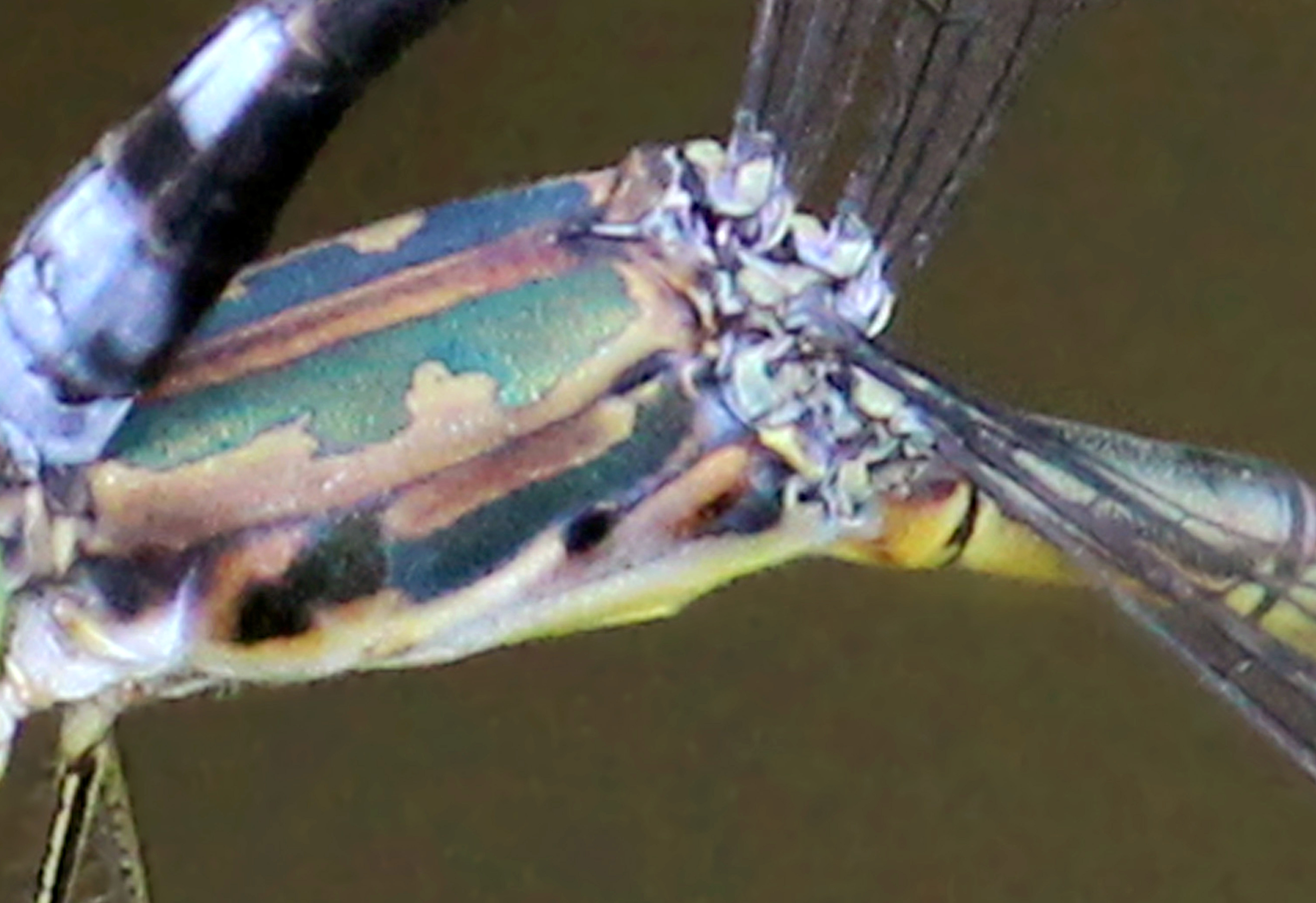
The diffuse black stripes on the humeral suture is more visible in female

Female thorax is olivaceous green, pale greenish yellow laterally. The markings are broader and more visible compared to the males. Anal appendages are small and black in color.

Its much larger size, the absence of markings on segments 8 and 9 in the male, diffuse black stripes on the humeral suture, and higher postnodal index will serve to distinguish it from L. praemorsus.

It breeds in well vegetated ponds and similar habitats.

== See also ==
- List of odonates of India
- List of odonata of Kerala
