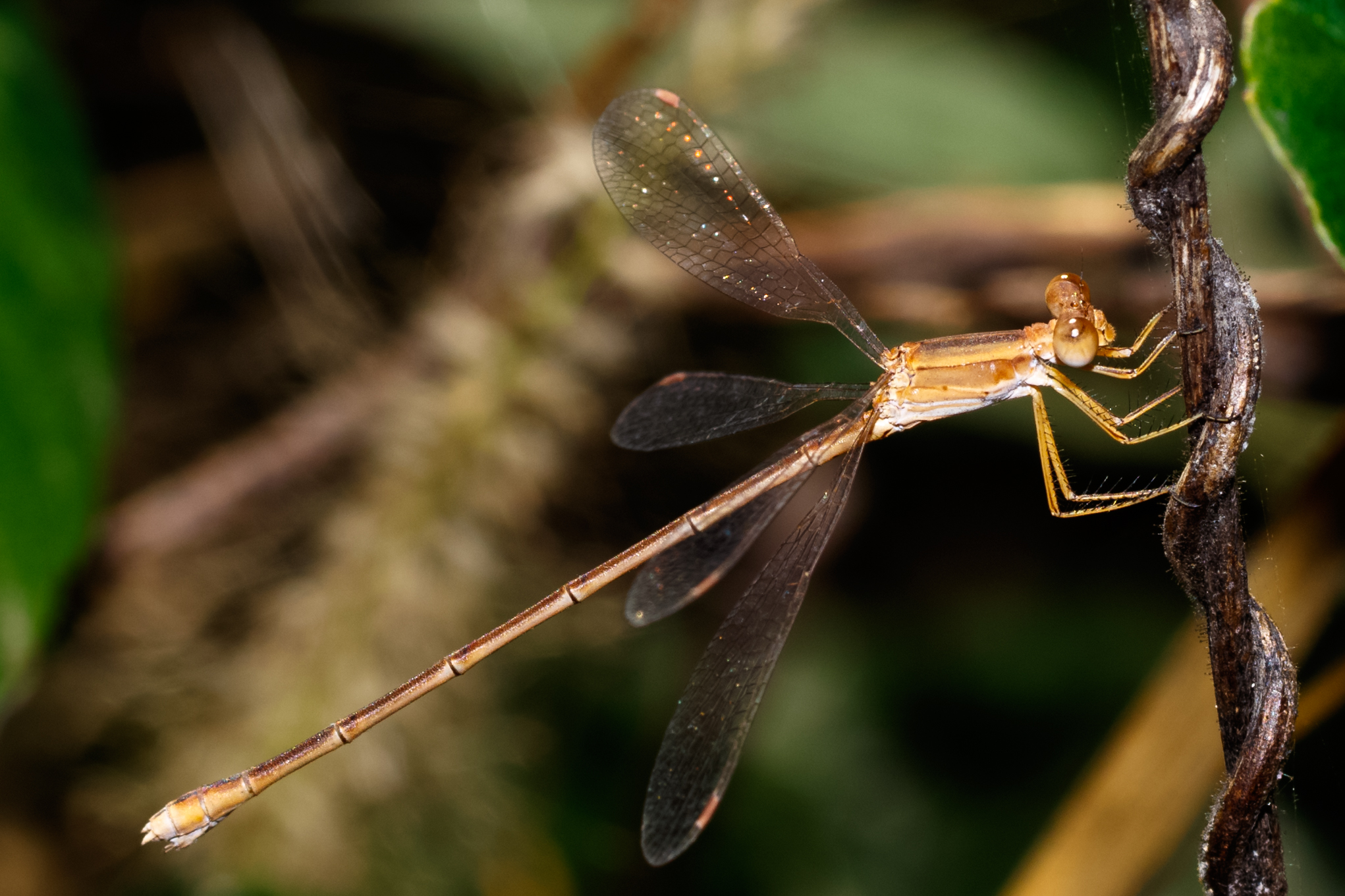
- Female, Thailand
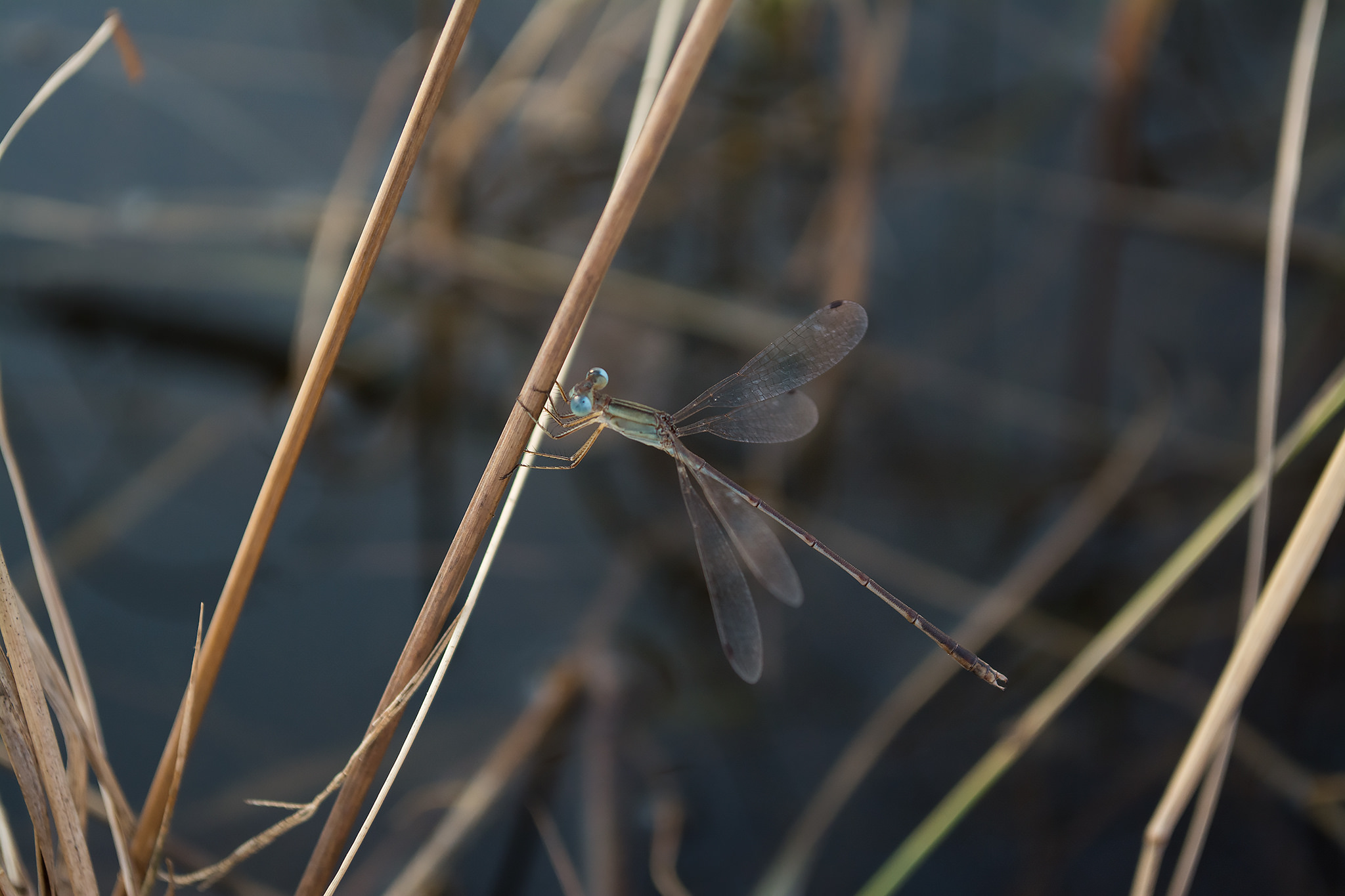
- Male, Thailand

Conservation status
- Least Concern (IUCN 3.1)

Scientific classification
- Kingdom: Animalia
- Phylum: Arthropoda
- Clade: Pancrustacea
- Class: Insecta
- Order: Odonata
- Suborder: Zygoptera
- Family: Lestidae
- Genus: Lestes
- Species: L. concinnus

Binomial name
- Lestes concinnus Hagen, 1862

Synonyms
- Lestes concinna Hagen in Selys, 1862; Lestes umbrina Selys, 1891; Lestes paludosus Tillyard, 1906; Lestes thoracica Laidlaw, 1920; Orolestes motis Baijal & Agarwal, 1955

= Lestes concinnus =

Dusky spreadwing

Species of damselfly

Lestes concinnus is a species of damselfly in the family Lestidae, the spreadwings. They are so named because they rest with their wings spread. This species is known commonly as the dusky spreadwing. It is a nomadic damselfly found in India, Southeast Asia as far as New Caledonia, and northern parts of Australia.

The adult is a medium-sized damselfly about 40 millimeters long with a wingspan around 45 millimeters. It is dusky-grey on dorsal surfaces graduating to light bluish-green on the sides and beneath. In Australia, the distribution is in suitable habitat in the north-west and north-eastern part of the continent from about Broome to the south-eastern Queensland border.

This species can be found in freshwater habitat types such as river lagoons, ponds, and swamps. Its population size is unknown but it has a wide range. Threats to the species have not been assessed. It is listed as a least-concern species on the IUCN Red List.

== Taxonomy ==
Lestes concinnus was described in 1862 jointly by Hagen and Sélys. Sélys described a new species, Lestes umbrina in 1891 from the specimens he purchased that are collected by Atkinson. Laidlaw and Fraser considered that this can be a synonym of L. concinna. M.A. Lieftinck (1934) synonymised these two species and after that these two species were considered synonyms until 1960; he himself restored the status of these as two different species. Laidlaw also described another species, Lestes thoracicus. Dumont et al. compared the specimens of these three species and concluded that they are synonyms as no structural differences were found among the color forms, varying from pale sand-coloured to greenish-blue.

== Etymology ==
The name Lestes comes from the Greek word λῃστής (lēistēs) meaning thief, referring to the predatory behaviour of species in this genus.

The species name concinnus is Latin for "elegant", "neat" or "pleasing".

== Gallery ==
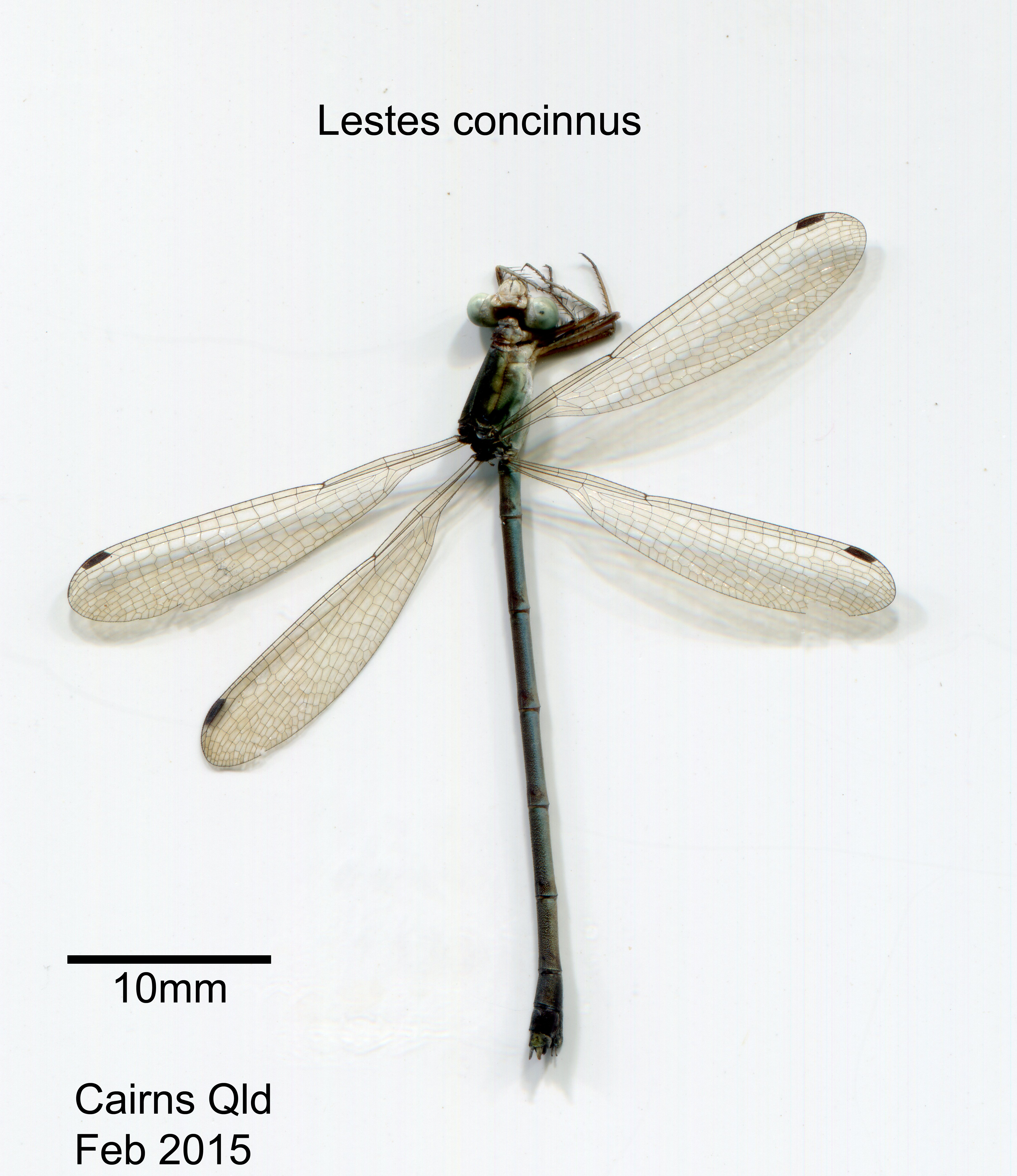
Female, Cairns, Queensland, Australia

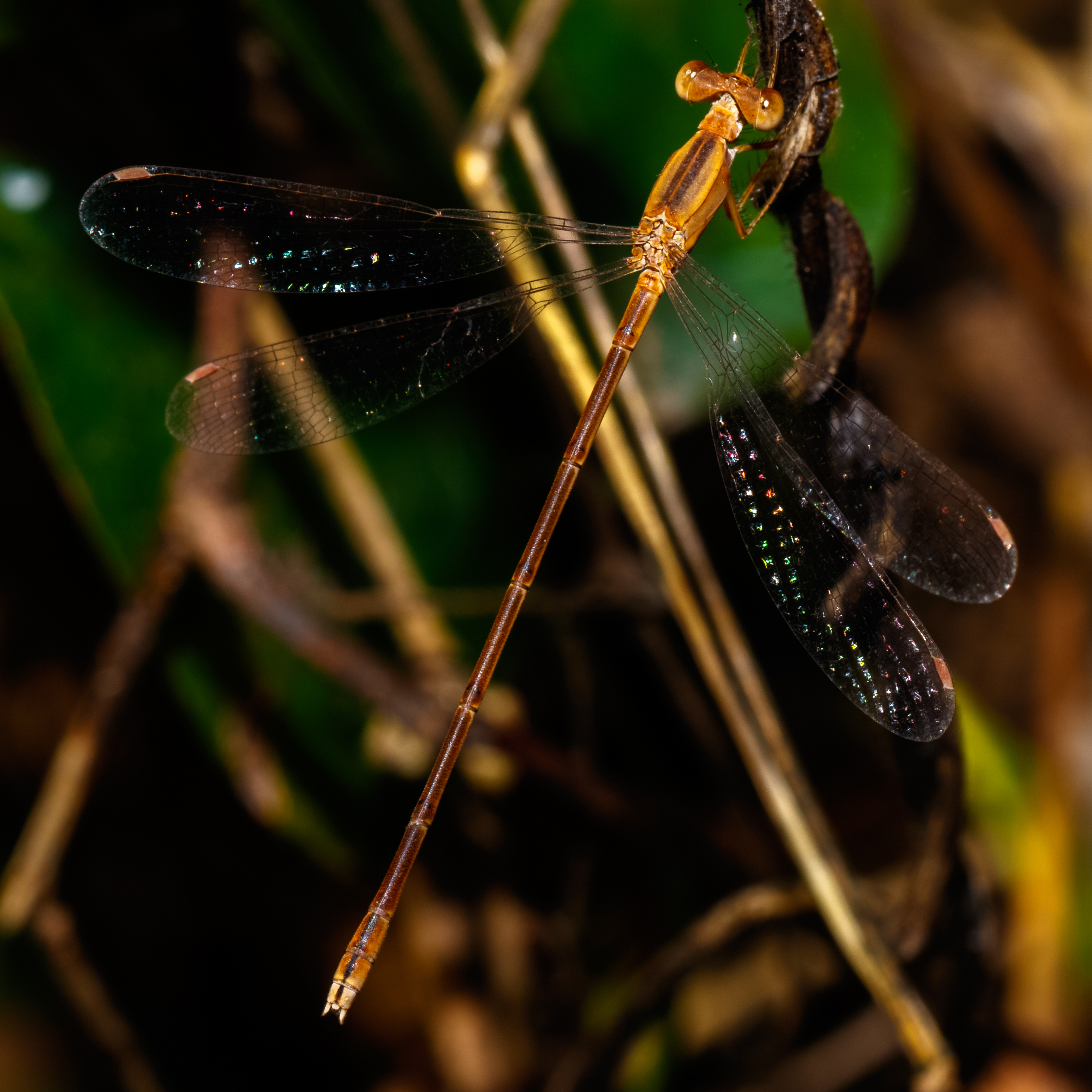
Female, Thailand

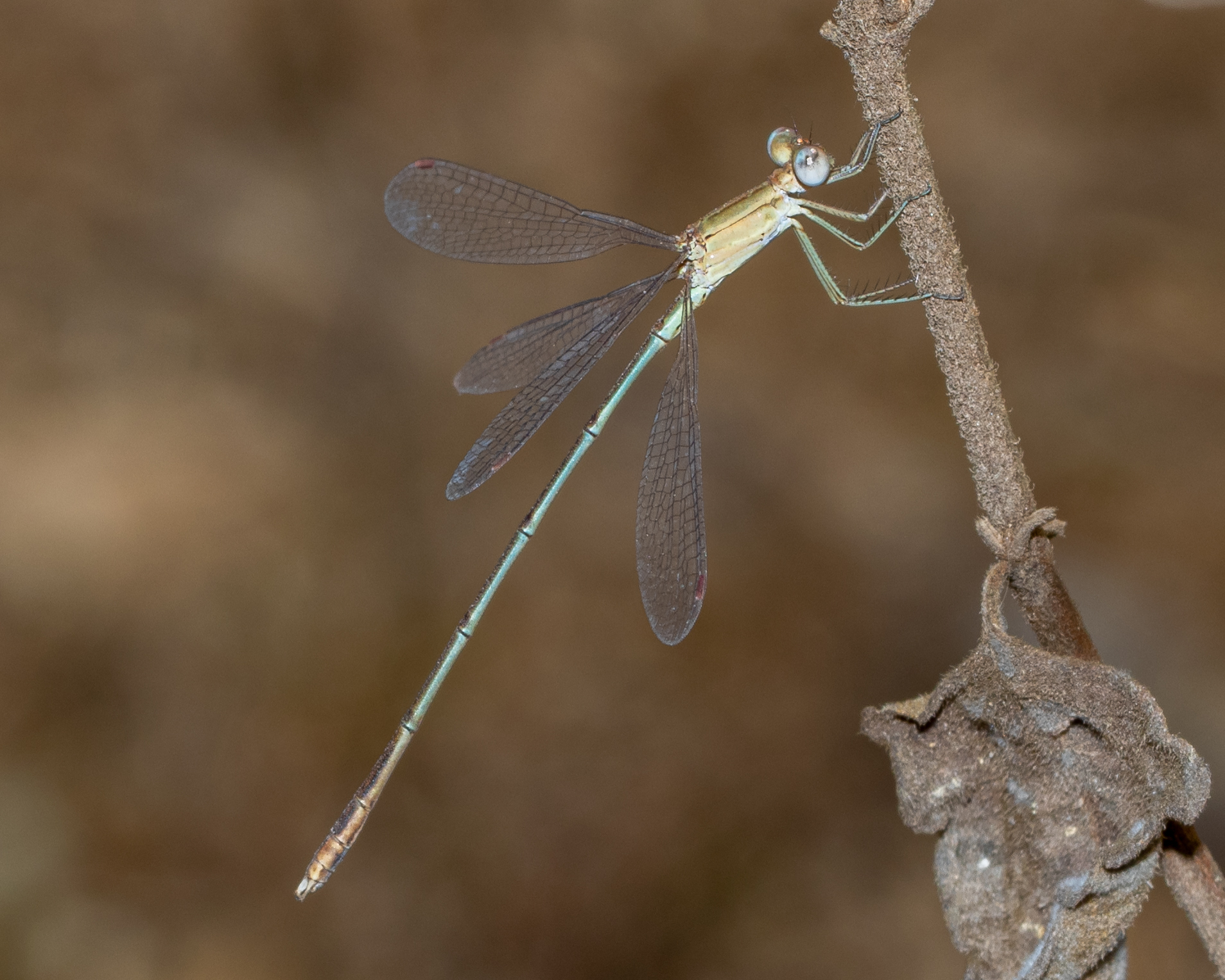
Male showing blue abdomen

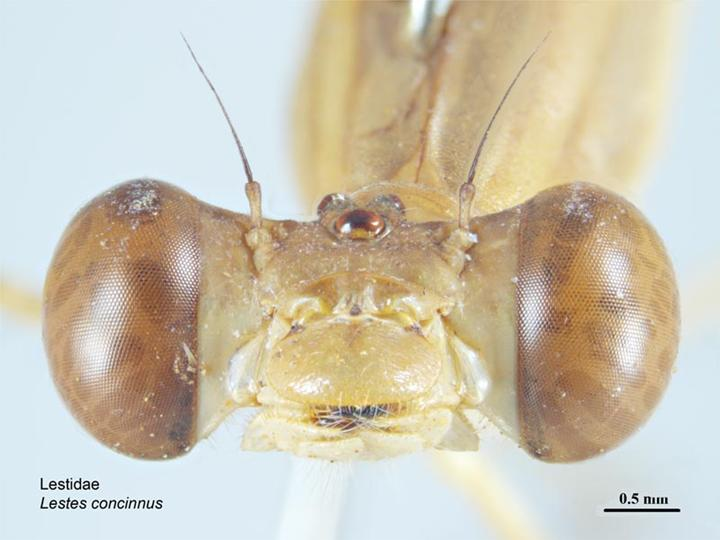
Head

Wing vein diagram right forewing

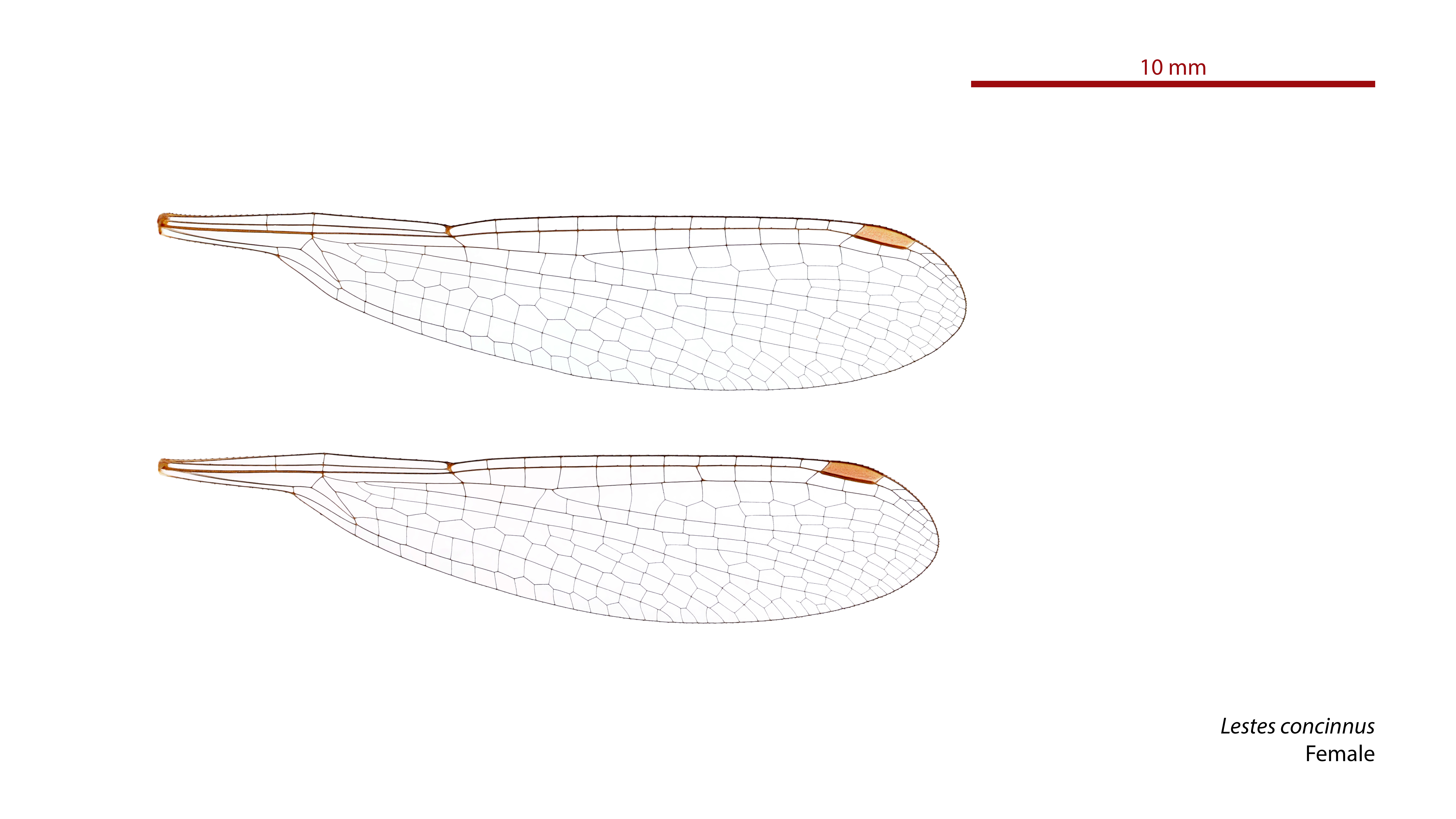
Photo of female wings

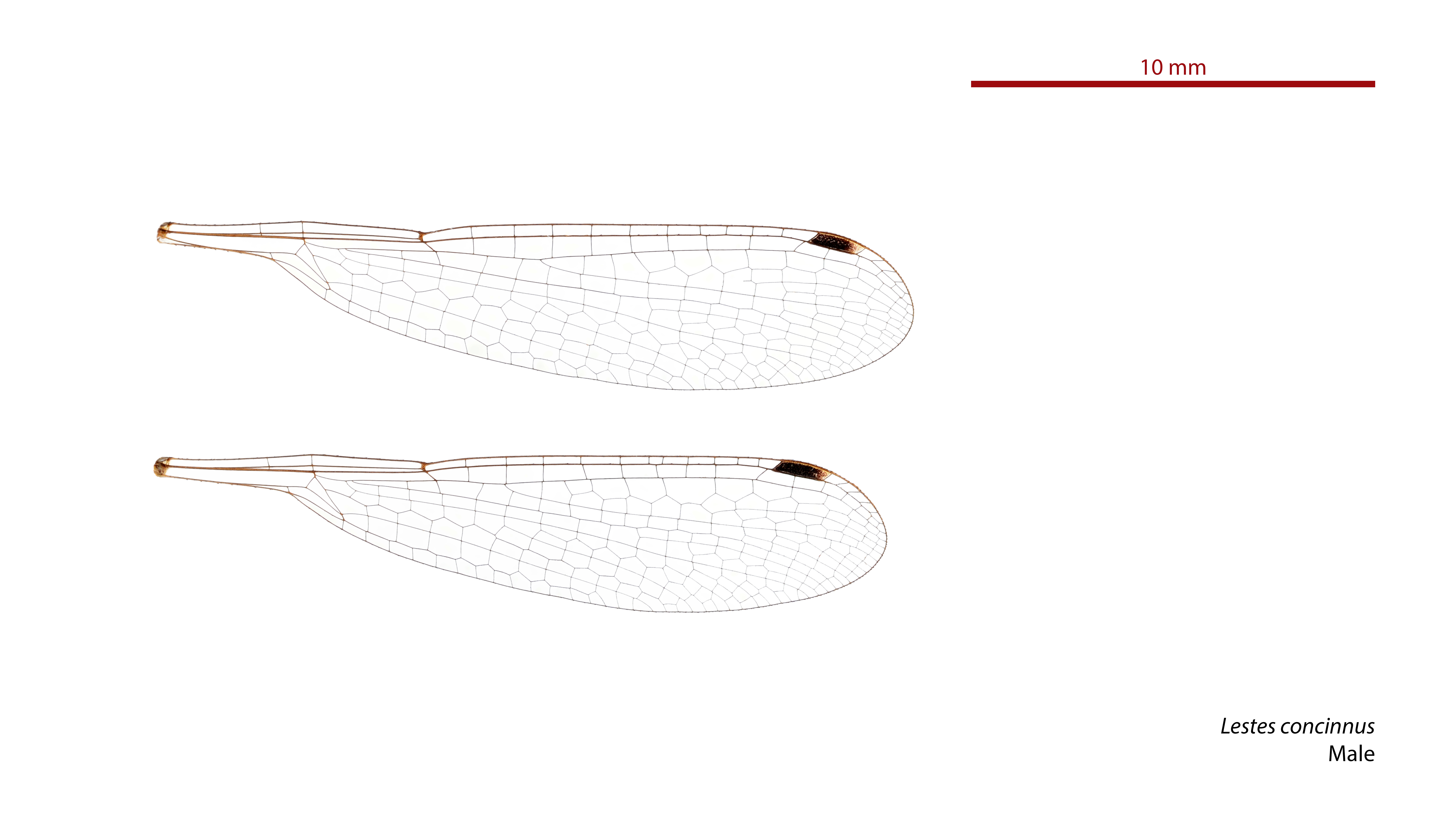
Photo of male wings

== See also ==
- List of odonates of India
- List of odonata of Kerala
