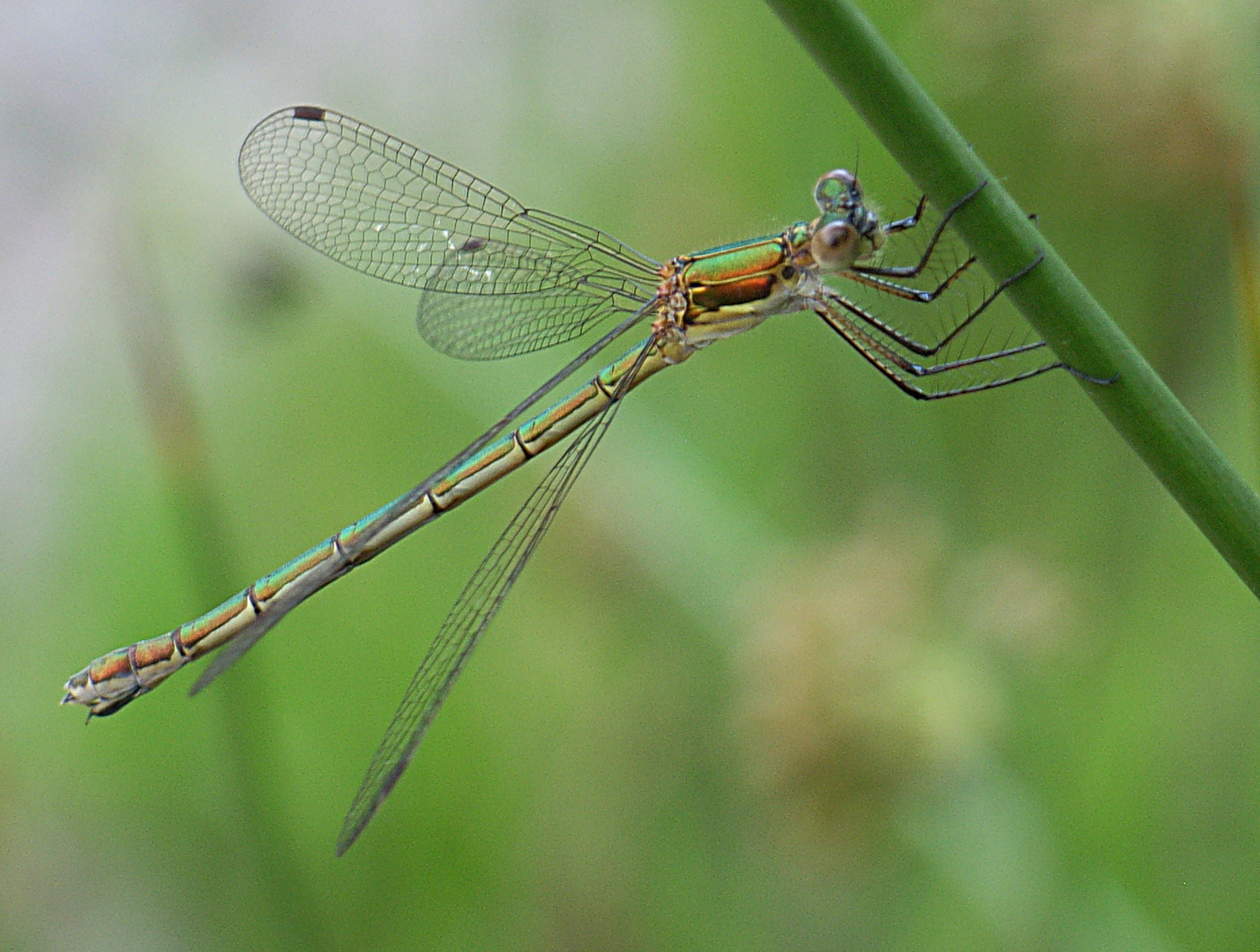
- female Lestes sponsa

Scientific classification
- Kingdom: Animalia
- Phylum: Arthropoda
- Clade: Pancrustacea
- Class: Insecta
- Order: Odonata
- Suborder: Zygoptera
- Family: Lestidae
- Genus: Lestes; Leach, 1815

= Lestes =

Genus of damselflies

Lestes is a widespread genus of damselflies in the family Lestidae. Species occur throughout much of the world and are commonly known as spreadwings.

== Description ==
Species of Lestes are medium-sized to large, slender damselflies, typically coloured green, bronze or brown with a metallic sheen. Unlike most damselflies, they usually rest with their wings held partly open, a characteristic that gives rise to the common name "spreadwings".

The wings have an elongated pterostigma near the tip of the leading edge, a characteristic feature of the family Lestidae. Males typically possess long, strongly curved appendages used to clasp females during mating.

== Distribution and habitat ==
Species of Lestes occur throughout much of the world, inhabiting ponds, marshes, swamps, lagoons and other still or slow-moving freshwater habitats.

== Taxonomy ==
Lestes is the largest genus in the family Lestidae. Modern studies support the recognition of Lestidae as a distinct family of damselflies, but suggest that relationships within the family may require further revision and that the broadly defined genus Lestes may be subdivided in the future.

== Etymology ==
The genus name Lestes comes from the Greek word λῃστής (lēistēs) meaning thief, referring to the predatory behaviour of damselflies.

== Species ==
The following species are currently placed in Lestes:

Male	Female	Scientific name	Common name	Distribution
		Lestes alacer Hagen, 1861	Plateau Spreadwing	Central America and North America
		Lestes alfonsoi González & Novelo, 2001		Central America.
		Lestes amicus Martin, 1910		Congo, Tanzania, Angola
		Lestes angularis Fraser, 1929		India
		Lestes apollinaris Navás, 1934		Colombia, Ecuador, Peru, Venezuela
		Lestes auripennis Fraser, 1955		Madagascar
		Lestes auritus Hagen in Selys, 1862		Brazil
		Lestes australis Walker, 1952	Southern Spreadwing	North America
		Lestes barbarus (Fabricius, 1798)	Southern Emerald Damselfly, Migrant Spreadwing	Europe in a band across Spain, France, Italy and Greece to India and Mongolia.
		Lestes basidens Belle, 1997		Surinam
		Lestes bipupillatus Calvert, 1909		Brazil, Venezuela, Argentina
		Lestes concinnus Hagen in Selys, 1862	Dusky Spreadwing	India, Southeast Asia as far as New Caledonia, and northern parts of Australia
		Lestes congener Hagen, 1861	Spotted Spreadwing	Canada and in the United States
		Lestes curvatus Belle, 1997		Surinam
		Lestes debellardi De Marmels, 1992		Surinam
		Lestes dichrostigma Calvert, 1909		Brazil
		Lestes disjunctus Selys, 1862	Northern Spreadwing	United States and Canada.
		Lestes dissimulans Fraser, 1955	Cryptic Spreadwing	Angola; Benin; Botswana; Côte d'Ivoire; Chad; Congo-Brazzaville; Democratic Republic of the Congo; Gabon; Gambia; Ghana; Kenya; Liberia; Malawi; Mozambique; Namibia; Nigeria; Republic of South Africa; Senegal; Tanzania; Togo; Uganda; Zambia; Zimbabwe
		Lestes dorothea Fraser, 1924	Forest Spreadwing	south and northeast India to Thailand and Malaysia
		Lestes dryas Kirby, 1890	Emerald Spreadwing, Scarce Emerald Damselfly, Robust Spreadwing, Turlough Spreadwing	central Europe and Asia from France to the Pacific and across North America
		Lestes elatus Hagen in Selys, 1862		India, Thailand and Sri Lanka.
		Lestes eurinus Say, 1839	Amber-winged Spreadwing	Northeastern North America
		Lestes falcifer Sjöstedt, 1918		Venezuela
		Lestes fernandoi Costa, De Souza & Muzón, 2006		Brazil
		Lestes forcipatus Rambur, 1842	Sweetflag Spreadwing	Canada and the United States
		Lestes forficula Rambur, 1842	Rainpool Spreadwing	Caribbean Sea, Central America, North America, and South America
		Lestes garoensis Lahiri, 1987		India
		Lestes helix Ris, 1918		Peru, Venezuela
		Lestes henshawi Calvert, 1907		Costa Rica, Ecuador, Colombia, Peru, Venezuela
		Lestes ictericus Gerstäcker, 1869	Tawny Spreadwing	Benin; Côte d'Ivoire; Democratic Republic of the Congo; Gambia; Kenya; Malawi; Mali; Mozambique; Republic of South Africa; Senegal; South Sudan; Sudan; Uganda; Zambia; Zimbabwe
		Lestes inaequalis Walsh, 1862	Elegant Spreadwing	eastern Canada and the United States
		Lestes japonicus Selys, 1883		Japan, Korean Peninsula, Eastern Russia
		Lestes jerrelli Tennessen, 1997		Ecuador
		Lestes jurzitzai Muzon, 1994		Brazil
		Lestes macrostigma (Eversmann, 1836)	Dark Emerald Damselfly or Dark Spreadwing	Europe into Central Asia and the Middle East
		Lestes malabaricus Fraser, 1929		Sri Lanka, South India and Andaman Islands
		Lestes malaisei Schmidt, 1964		Myanmar
		Lestes minutus Selys, 1862		Brazil, Trinidad, Venezuela
		Lestes nigriceps Fraser, 1924		Cambodia
		Lestes nodalis Selys, 1891		Northeast India, Thailand and China.
		Lestes numidicus Samraoui, Weekers & Dumont, 2003		Algeria
		Lestes ochraceus Selys, 1862		Benin; Côte d'Ivoire; Democratic Republic of the Congo; Gabon; Gambia; Ghana; Kenya; Malawi; South Sudan; Tanzania; Uganda; Zambia; Zimbabwe
		Lestes pallidus Rambur, 1842		Angola; Botswana; Cameroon; Cape Verde; Chad; Democratic Republic of the Congo; Ethiopia; Gambia; Ghana; Kenya; Malawi; Mali; Mauritania; Mozambique; Namibia; Niger; Nigeria; Republic of South Africa; Senegal; Somalia; Sudan; Tanzania; Uganda; Zambia; Zimbabwe
		Lestes patricia Fraser, 1924		Western Ghats in India
		Lestes paulistus Calvert, 1909		Brazil
		Lestes pictus Hagen in Selys, 1862		Brazil
		Lestes pinheyi Fraser, 1955	Pinhey's Spreadwing	Angola; Botswana; Democratic Republic of the Congo; Gabon; Ghana; Malawi; Namibia; Nigeria; Tanzania; Zambia; Zimbabwe
		Lestes plagiatus (Burmeister, 1839)	Highland Spreadwing	Angola; Botswana; Democratic Republic of the Congo; Kenya; Malawi; Mozambique; Nigeria; Republic of South Africa; Swaziland; Tanzania; Uganda; Zambia; Zimbabwe
		Lestes praecellens Lieftinck, 1937		Malaysia
		Lestes praemorsus Hagen in Selys, 1862		India to China and south to New Guinea
		Lestes praevius Lieftinck, 1940		Sabah
		Lestes pruinescens Martin, 1910		Madagascar
		Lestes quadristriatus Calvert, 1909		Brazil
		Lestes rectangularis Say, 1839	Slender Spreadwing	eastern Canada and the United States
		Lestes regulatus Martin, 1910		Ethiopia
		Lestes scalaris Gundlach, 1888		Caribbean
		Lestes secula May, 1993		Panama
		Lestes sigma Calvert, 1901	Chalky Spreadwing	Central America and North America
		Lestes silvaticus Schmidt, 1951		Madagascar
		Lestes simplex Hagen, 1861		Mexico
		Lestes simulatrix McLachlan, 1895		Madagascar
		Lestes spatula Fraser, 1946		Argentina, Uruguay, Paraguay
		Lestes sponsa (Hansemann, 1823)	Emerald Damselfly, Common Spreadwing	central Europe and Asia from Spain to the Pacific
		Lestes spumarius Hagen in Selys, 1862	Antillean Spreadwing	Caribbean Sea and North America.
		Lestes sternalis Navás, 1930		Colombia
		Lestes stultus Hagen, 1861	Black Spreadwing	United States
		Lestes temporalis Selys, 1883		Japan
		Lestes tenuatus Rambur, 1842	Blue-striped Spreadwing	Central America, Ecuador
		Lestes thoracicus Laidlaw, 1920	emerald-striped spreadwing	Bangladesh, India, and Thailand
		Lestes tikalus Kormoondy, 1959		Guatemala
		Lestes trichonus Belle, 1997		Surinam
		Lestes tricolor Erichson, 1848		Brazil. British Guyana
		Lestes tridens McLachlan, 1895	Spotted Spreadwing	Angola; Botswana; Côte d'Ivoire; Congo-Brazzaville; Democratic Republic of the Congo; Ethiopia; Gabon; Kenya; Liberia; Mozambique; Namibia; Nigeria; Republic of South Africa; Somalia; Tanzania; Togo; Zambia; Zimbabwe
		Lestes umbrinus Selys, 1891		Myanmar
		Lestes uncifer Karsch, 1899	Sickle Spreadwing	Cameroon; Democratic Republic of the Congo; Gabon; Kenya; Malawi; Mozambique; Republic of South Africa; Somalia; Tanzania; Uganda; Zambia; Zimbabwe
		Lestes undulatus Say, 1840		Chile, Uruguay, Argentina, Chile
		Lestes unguiculatus Hagen, 1861	Lyre-tipped Spreadwing	United States
		Lestes urubamba Kennedy, 1942		Peru
		Lestes vidua Hagen, 1861	Carolina Spreadwing	United States
		Lestes vigilax Hagen in Selys, 1862	Swamp Spreadwing	United States
		Lestes virens (Charpentier, 1825)	Small Emerald Damselfly, Small Spreadwing	Europe, north Africa, and western and central Asia
		Lestes virgatus (Burmeister, 1839)	Smoky Spreadwing	Angola; Botswana; Democratic Republic of the Congo; Ethiopia; Kenya; Malawi; Mozambique; Nigeria; Republic of South Africa; Rwanda; Tanzania; Uganda; Zambia; Zimbabwe
		Lestes viridulus Rambur, 1842	Emerald-striped Spreadwing	India

== Fossils ==
The fossil record of the genus Lestes extends from the Late Eocene to the present, with fossils known from Europe and Asia, indicating a long history and broad distribution.

- †Lestes aquisextana
- †Lestes arvernus
- †Lestes brisaci
- †Lestes ceresti
- †Lestes conexus
- †Lestes datangensis
- †Lestes dianacompteae
- †Lestes forsterii
- †Lestes irenea
- †Lestes leucosia
- †Lestes ligea
- †Lestes lutzi
- †Lestes peisinoe
- †Lestes plicata
- †Lestes regina
- †Lestes sieblosiformis
- †Lestes statzi
- †Lestes vicina
- †Lestes zalesskyi

== See also ==
- Chalcolestes
