= Lestes amicus =

Conservation status
- Least Concern (IUCN 3.1)

Scientific classification
- Kingdom: Animalia
- Phylum: Arthropoda
- Class: Insecta
- Order: Odonata
- Suborder: Zygoptera
- Family: Lestidae
- Genus: Lestes
- Species: L. amicus

Binomial name
- Lestes amicus Martin, 1910

Species of damselfly

Lestes amicus is a species of damselfly in the family Lestidae, the spreadwings. It is native to much of southern and central Africa. It lives near streams and pools, often in swampy habitat.
