= Narayamkulam =

- village
- Narayamkulam Location in Kerala, India Narayamkulam (India)
- Coordinates: 11°29′30″N 75°50′30″E
- Country: India
- State: Kerala
- District: Kozhikode

Government
  - Type: panchayath
  - Body: kerala sarkaar

Languages
  - Official: Malayalam,
- Time zone: UTC+5:30 (IST)
- PIN: 673614
- Telephone code: 0496
- Vehicle registration: KL-11. KL-56
- Nearest city: Perambra, Balussery
- Climate: medium hot (Köppen)

Narayamkulam is a village in Kottur Panjayath, Kozhikode district, India.

== Transportation ==
Narayamkulam village connects to other parts of India through Vatakara town on the west and Kuttiady town on the east. National Highway No. 66 passes through Vatakara and the northern stretch connects to Mangalore, Goa and Mumbai. The southern stretch connects to Cochin and Trivandrum. The eastern National Highway No.54 going through Kuttiady connects to Mananthavady, Mysore and Bangalore. The nearest airports are at Kannur and Kozhikode. The nearest railway station is at Koyilandy.

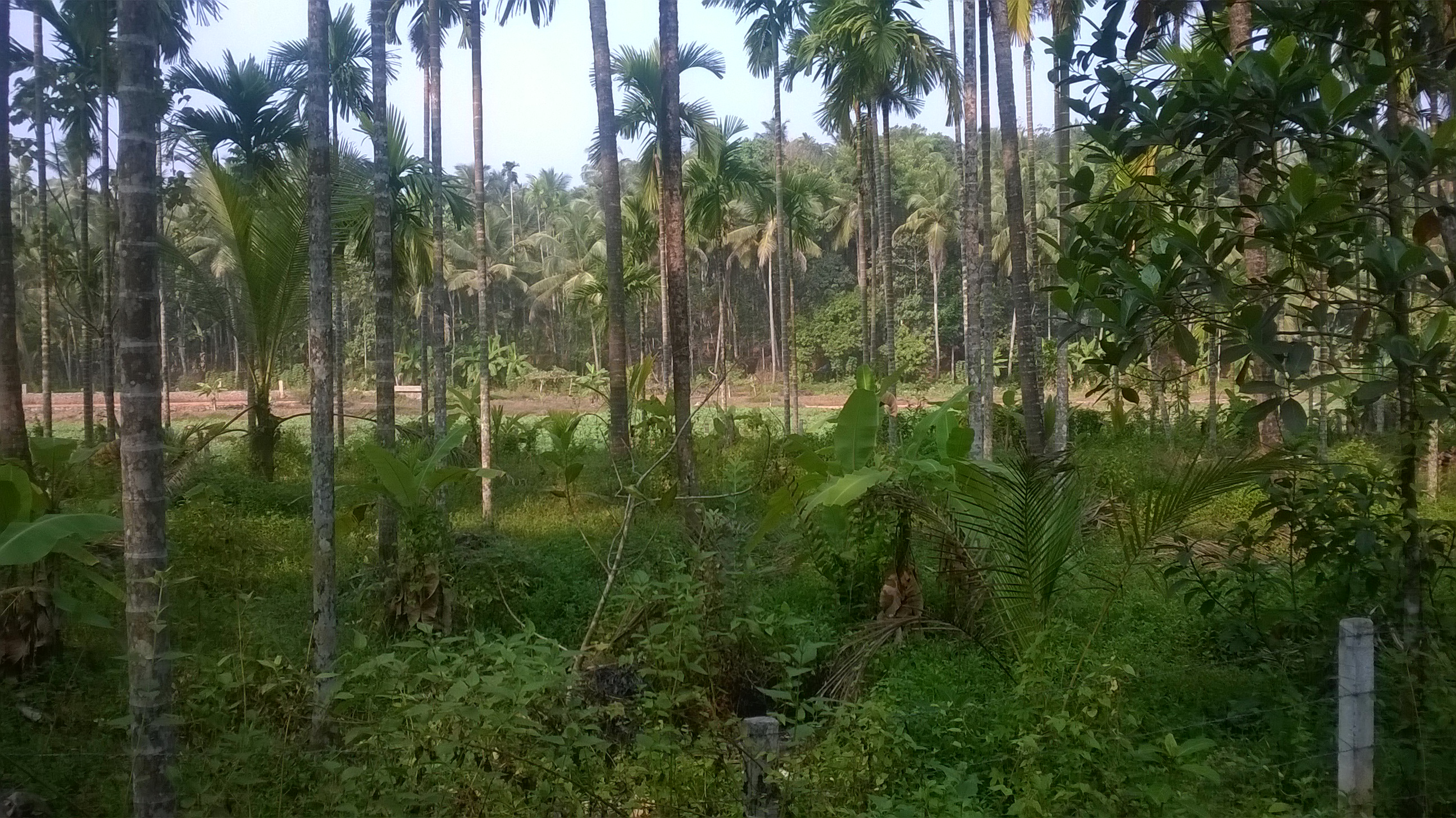
നരയംകുളത്തെ ഒരു വയൽ പ്രദേശം

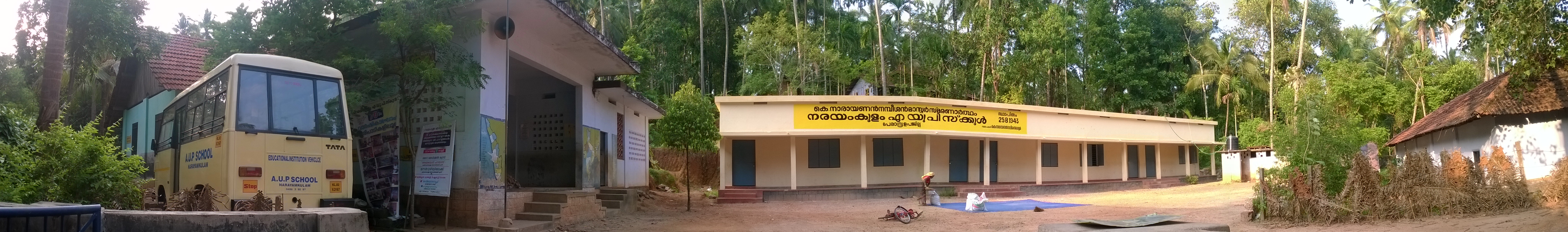
Narayamkulam AUP School
