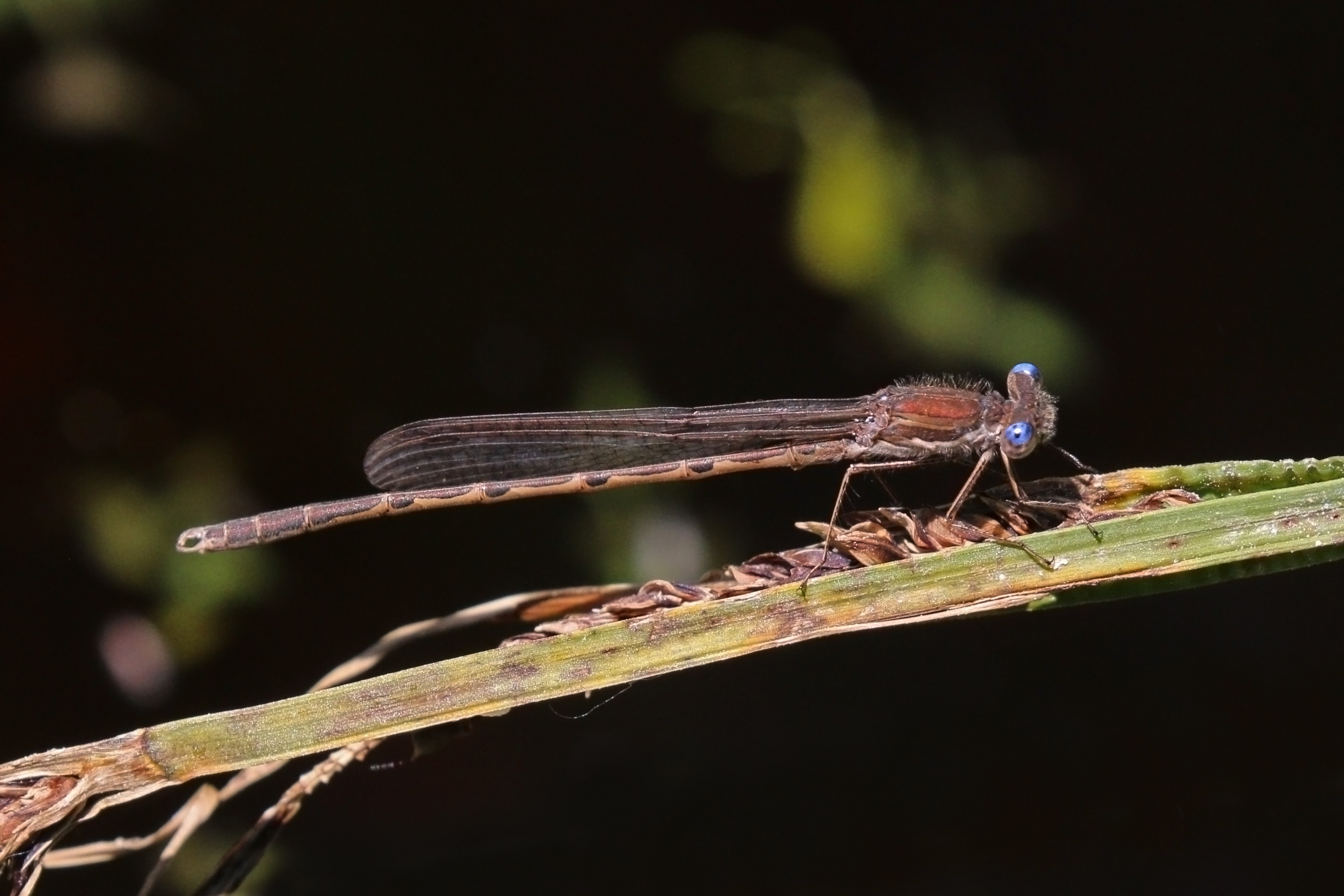
- Male; Kampinos Forest, Poland
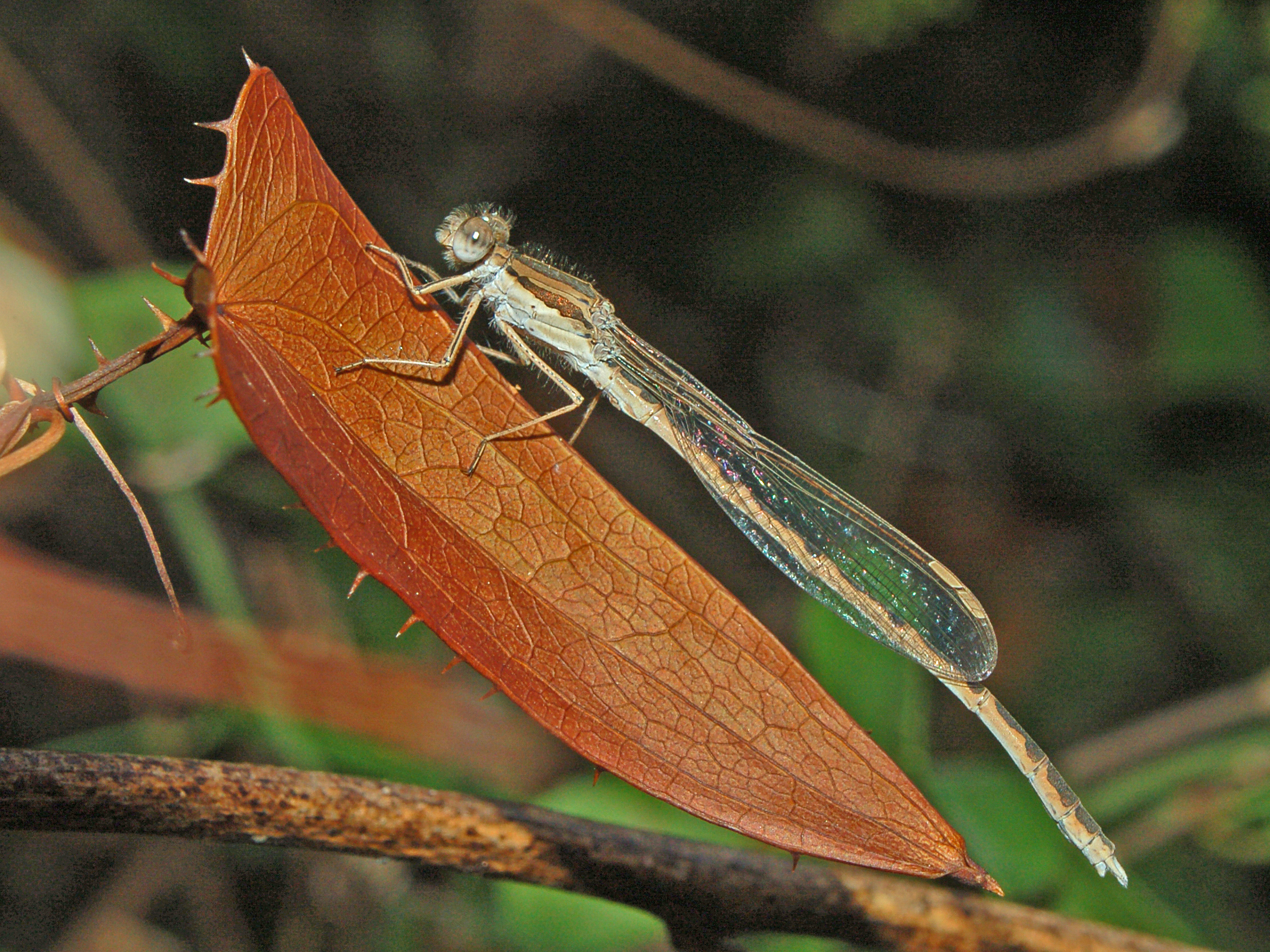

Scientific classification
- Kingdom: Animalia
- Phylum: Arthropoda
- Clade: Pancrustacea
- Class: Insecta
- Order: Odonata
- Suborder: Zygoptera
- Family: Lestidae
- Genus: Sympecma
- Species: S. fusca

Binomial name
- Sympecma fusca (Vander Linden, 1820)

Synonyms
- List: Agrion fuscum Vander Linden, 1820; Agrion phallatum Charpentier 1825; Lestes fusca Selys & Hagen 1850; Sympecma aragonensis Navás, 1927

= Sympecma fusca =

Species of damselfly

Sympecma fusca, the common winter damselfly, is a damselfly a member of the Lestidae and related to the emeralds or spreadwings.

== Distribution and habitat ==
This species can be found in much of southern and central Europe stretching out to Asia where it is replaced by S. paedisca. It is found around the Mediterranean in Europe and North Africa and on many Mediterranean islands.

It can be found in all types of standing water, including in brackish waters. In winter adults are found away from water on dry plant stems usually in open areas such as grassland and heaths.

There are only two records for this species in Britain; the first was recorded on 21 December 2008 in S E Wales., the second was recorded by Terry Crow at Wildern Moor within Wildern Local Nature Reserve in Hedge End on 5 May 2022.

== Description ==
Sympecma fusca can reach a length of about 38 millimetres (1.5 in). It is distinct from all other European damselflies except Sympecma paedisca, so in most of its range there are no problems with identification. It does not have the bright blue or red colouration that is more usual for damselflies so it is often overlooked. It does not have the metallic emerald green sheen that is characteristic of the Lestes.

These damselflies have pale brown pterostigma on both forewing and hindwing and the pterostigma are nearer the wing tip on the forewing which means that both pterostigma can be seen with the wings closed, they do not overlap as in other damselflies. In the field this is easily seen and distinguishes Sympecma from all other damselflies. Males that have overwintered have dark brown pterostigma on both forewing and hindwing and many develop blue eyes.

Where both S. fusca and S. paedisca fly together careful examination of the adult, in the hand, preferably under magnification, is required to tell the two species apart. In the male the anal appendages are slightly different and there are subtle differences in the markings on the thorax in both sexes.

== Behaviour ==
This species is found all year round as it overwinters as an adult. It usually blends in with the dried grass stalks in which it overwinters. It is one of only two species of European dragonflies that overwinter as adult insects, the other being the related Sympecma paedisca. Although related to the Lestes 'spreadwing' damselflies, Sympecma rest with their wings alongside their bodies

In spring these damselflies mate and with the pairs still in tandem, the females oviposit in floating vegetation. Most reproductive behaviour occurs in April and May. The eggs hatch and the larvae develop rapidly in about 2 months. When the adults emerge they move away from water, often to heath or grassland a long distance from water, where they overwinter hidden amongst dried plant stems.

== Gallery ==
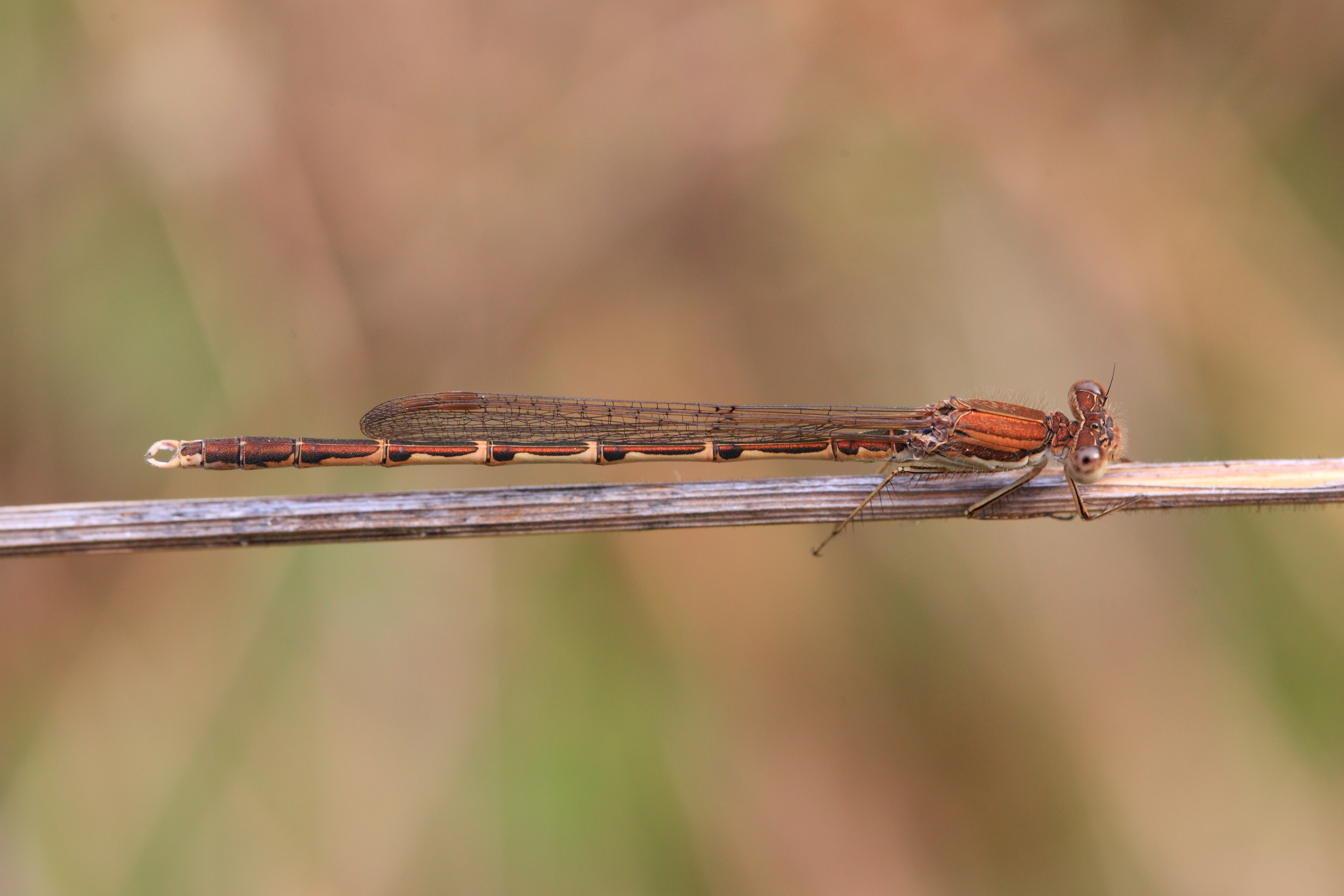
Young male

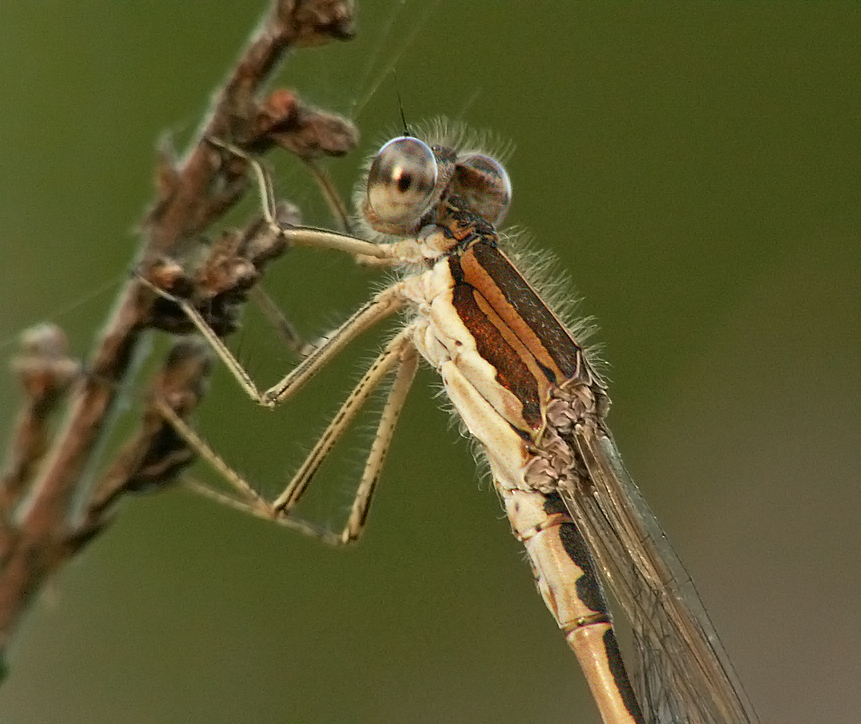
Detail of a male

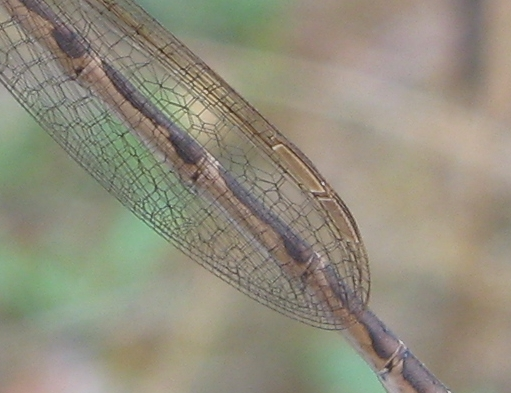
Pterostigma from both wings can be seen

Clip on oviposition

== See also ==
- List of damselflies of the world (Lestidae)
- Lestes dryas
- Lestes barbarus
- Lestes virens
- Lestes macrostigma
- Lestes viridis
- Lestes parvidens

== Bibliography ==
- Askew, R.R. (2004) The Dragonflies of Europe. (revised ed.) Harley Books. pp65–66ISBN 0946589755
- d'Aguilar, J., Dommanget, JL., and Prechac, R. (1986) A field guide to the Dragonflies of Britain, Europe and North Africa. Collins. ISBN 0-00-219436-8
- Gibbons, R.B., (1986). Dragonflies and Damselflies of Britain and Northern Europe. Country Life Books. ISBN 0-600-35841-0.
- Dijkstra, K-D.B & Lewington, R. (2006) Field Guide to the Dragonflies of Britain and Europe. British Wildlife Publishing. ISBN 0-9531399-4-8.
