= List of Odonata species of Metropolitan France =

This article is an alphabetic list of odonates (dragonflies and damselflies) species found in Metropolitan France, including Corsica.

- Gomphus flavipes, the river clubtail
- Gomphus graslinii
- Gomphus pulchellus, the Western clubtail
- Gomphus vulgatissimus, the common clubtail
- Lestes barbarus, the Southern emerald damselfly
- Lestes dryas, the emerald spreadwing
- Lestes macrostigma, the dark emerald damselfly
- Lestes sponsa, the emerald damselfly
- Lestes virens, the small emerald damselfly
- Leucorrhinia albifrons, the dark whiteface
- Leucorrhinia caudalis, the lilypad whiteface
- Libellula depressa, the broad-bodied chaser
- Macromia splendens
- Onychogomphus forcipatus, the small pincertail
- Onychogomphus uncatus, the large pincertail
- Ophiogomphus cecilia
- Orthetrum cancellatum, the black-tailed skimmer
- Platycnemis acutipennis, the orange featherleg
- Trithemis annulata, the violet dropwing
