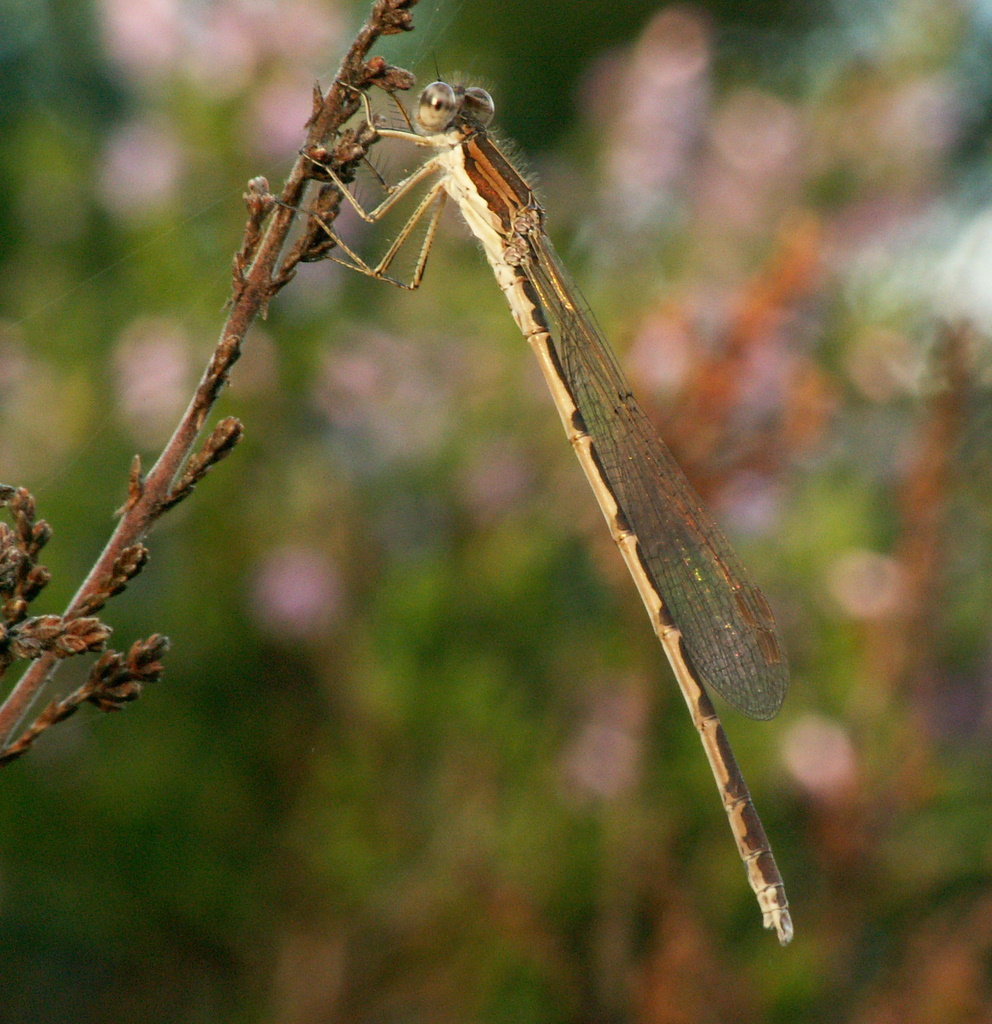
- Male S. fusca

Scientific classification
- Kingdom: Animalia
- Phylum: Arthropoda
- Class: Insecta
- Order: Odonata
- Suborder: Zygoptera
- Family: Lestidae
- Genus: Sympecma; Burmeister, 1839

= Sympecma =

Genus of damselfly

Sympecma is a genus of damselfly in the family Lestidae.

The genus contains the following species:

Male	Female	Scientific name	Common name	Distribution
		Sympecma fusca (Vander Linden, 1820)	Common Winter Damselfly	southern and central Europe stretching out to Asia, Mediterranean in Europe and North Africa and on many Mediterranean islands
		Sympecma gobica Förster, 1900		From the very east of Europe deep into Asia
		Sympecma paedisca (Brauer, 1877)	Siberian Winter Damsel	From the Baltic countries to Japan, with western populations in the north of Germany and the Netherlands, and in the Alps and some other mountainous regions
