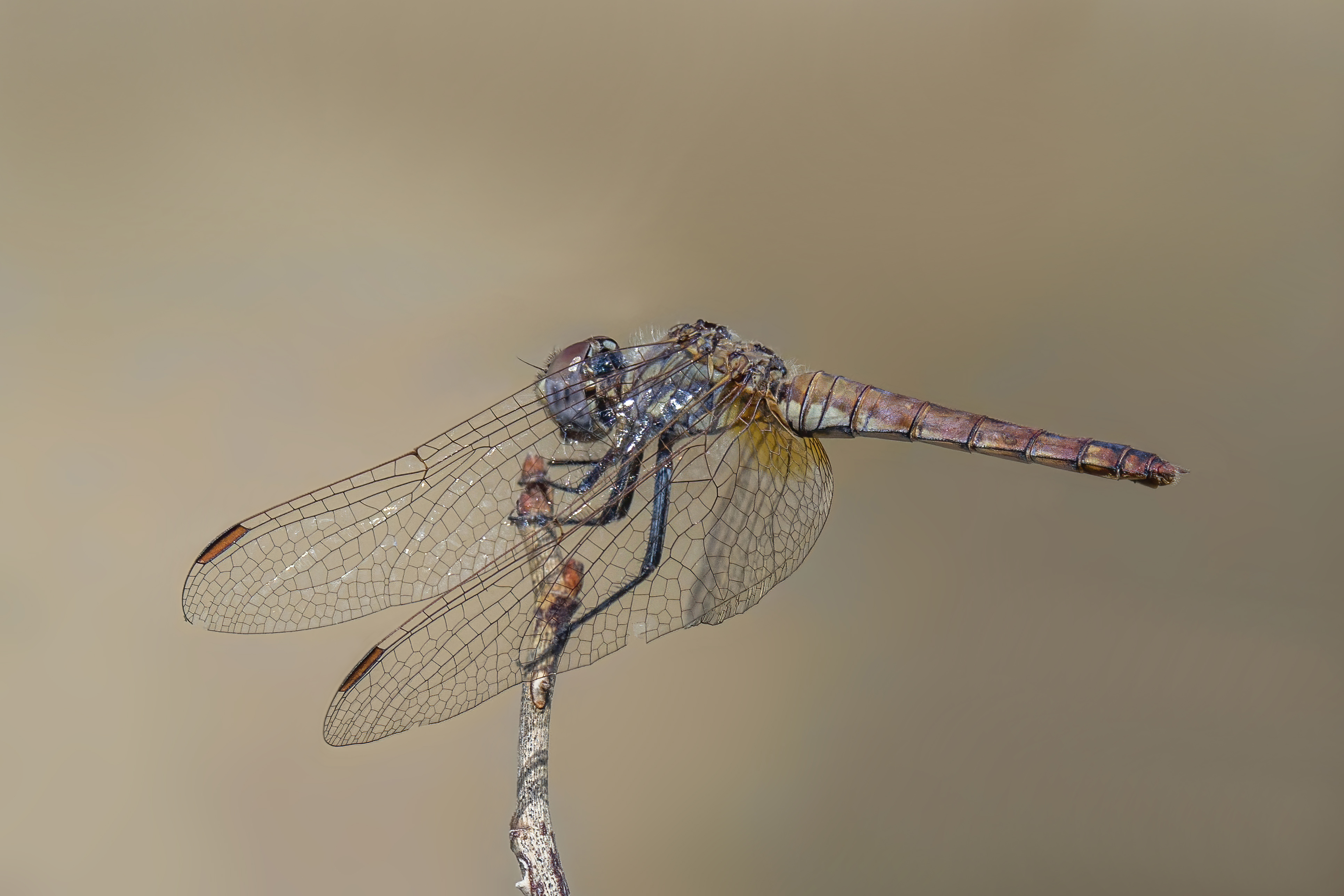
- Mature female, Cyprus

Conservation status
- Least Concern (IUCN 3.1)

Scientific classification
- Kingdom: Animalia
- Phylum: Arthropoda
- Clade: Pancrustacea
- Class: Insecta
- Order: Odonata
- Suborder: Anisoptera
- Superfamily: Libelluloidea
- Family: Libellulidae
- Genus: Trithemis
- Species: T. annulata

Binomial name
- Trithemis annulata (Beauvois, 1807)

= Trithemis annulata =

- Male, Egypt

Species of dragonfly

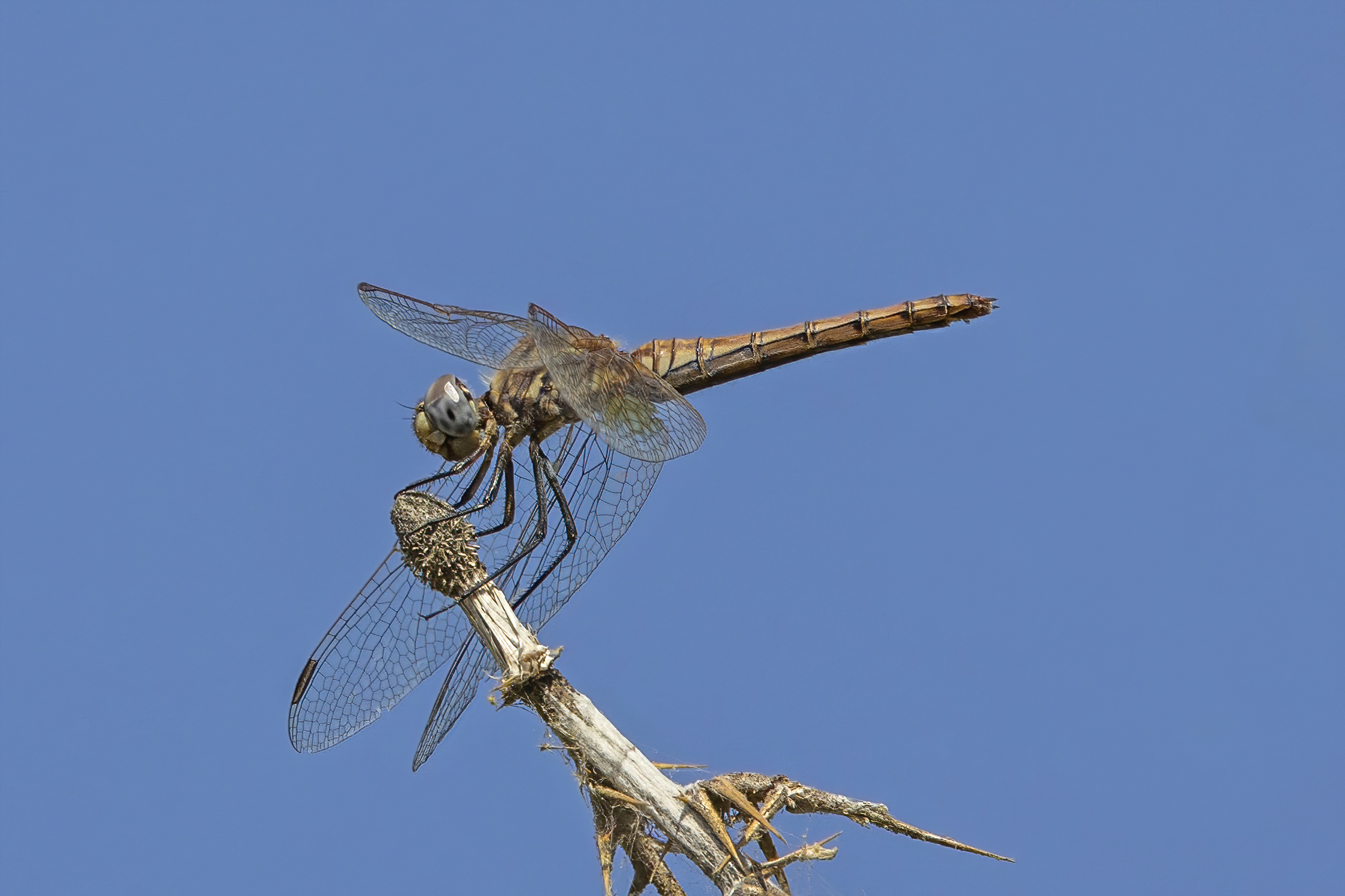
Female

Trithemis annulata, commonly known as the violet dropwing, violet-marked darter, purple-blushed darter, or plum-coloured dropwing, is a species of dragonfly in the family Libellulidae. It is found in most of Africa, the Middle East, and southern Europe. These dragonflies are called dropwings because of their habit of immediately lowering their wings after landing on a perch. Males of this species are violet-red with red veins in the wings, while females are yellow and brown. Both sexes have red eyes.

== Subspecies ==
The following subspecies are recognized:

- Trithemis annulata annulata (Palisot de Beauvois, 1807)
- Trithemis annulata haematina (Rambur, 1842)
- Trithemis annulata scorteccii Nielsen, 1936

== Description ==
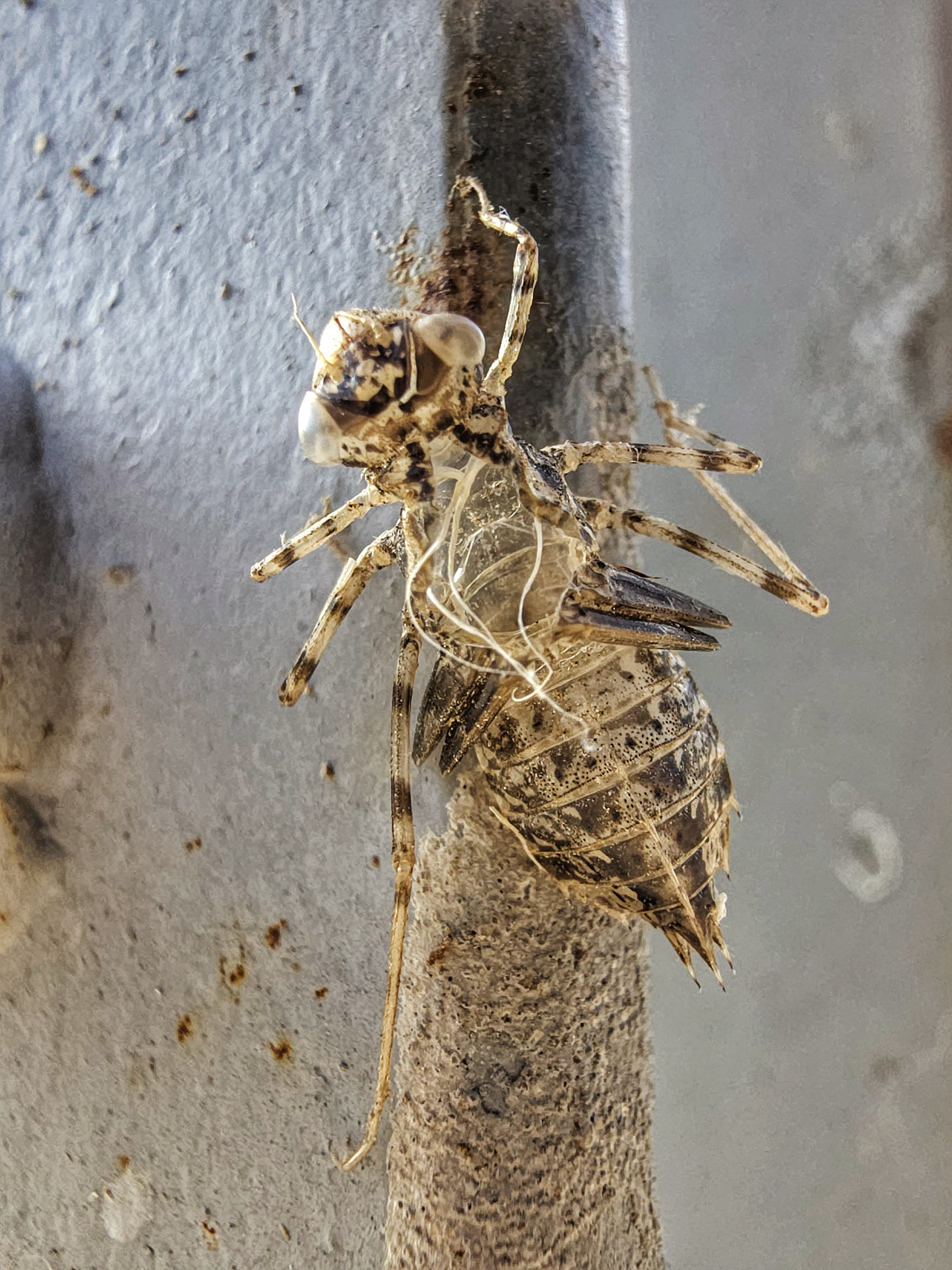
Exuvia

Trithemis annulata is a robust medium-sized species with a wingspan of 60 mm (2.4 in). The mature male has a dark red head and a yellow labium with a brown central spot. The eyes are red with white spots on the rear edge, and the frons is dark metallic purplish-red. The prothorax is violet with slightly darker longitudinal stripes. The membranous wings have distinctive red veins, the pterostigma is orange-brown, and there is a large orange-brown splash at the base of the hind wings. The abdomen is fairly broad and is pinkish-violet, with purple markings on the top of each segment and blackish markings on the terminal three segments. Females are a similar size to males, but the thorax is brownish, and the abdomen is yellow with dark brown markings. The wings of females lack the red veins of males but have similar orange-brown patches. It is very similar in appearance to the red-veined dropwing (Trithemis arteriosa), but that species has a more slender abdomen and a wedge-shaped black area on either side of the tip of the abdomen.

== Distribution ==
Trithemis annulata is found in most of Africa and also in France, Cyprus, Greece, India, Iran, Iraq, Israel, Italy, Jordan, Kuwait, Lebanon, Mauritius, Oman, Portugal, Qatar, Réunion, Syria, Turkey, United Arab Emirates, and Yemen. It was also recorded in the Maltese islands in 2005 and found breeding there in 2007. With the advent of global warming, it is increasing its range northwards in Europe and in the late 1990s advanced from southern Spain and southern Italy into France, and from Greece and Turkey into Central Europe. One such place where it has become established is the floodplain of the River Ebro in northeastern Spain.

== Ecology ==
Trithemis annulata is an adaptable species, and the adults can tolerate a range of habitats, including semi-arid rangeland. They can be seen flying near sluggish rivers, in marshes, and also beside still-water ponds. They are sometimes seen in brackish water habitats, although it is unclear whether they actually breed in salty water. The larvae develop rapidly, so these dragonflies can make use of temporary water bodies for breeding. Males are often seen perching on the twigs of waterside shrubs and on rocks in the sunshine, but in the evening or when the sun is obscured, they move into trees.

The female T. annulata is thought to deposit her eggs by flying over the surface and dipping the tip of her abdomen in the water. The larvae develop in water where they are aggressive predators. The adults are also predators, using their excellent eyesight to detect prey and their legs to hold and carry their victims.

== Status ==
Trithemis annulata is a very common species throughout its wide range, which includes most of Africa, the Mediterranean area, the Arabian Peninsula, and the Near East. Although it may be threatened locally by habitat loss, in general, it seems to be increasing in abundance, and the International Union for Conservation of Nature has assessed its conservation status as being of least concern.
