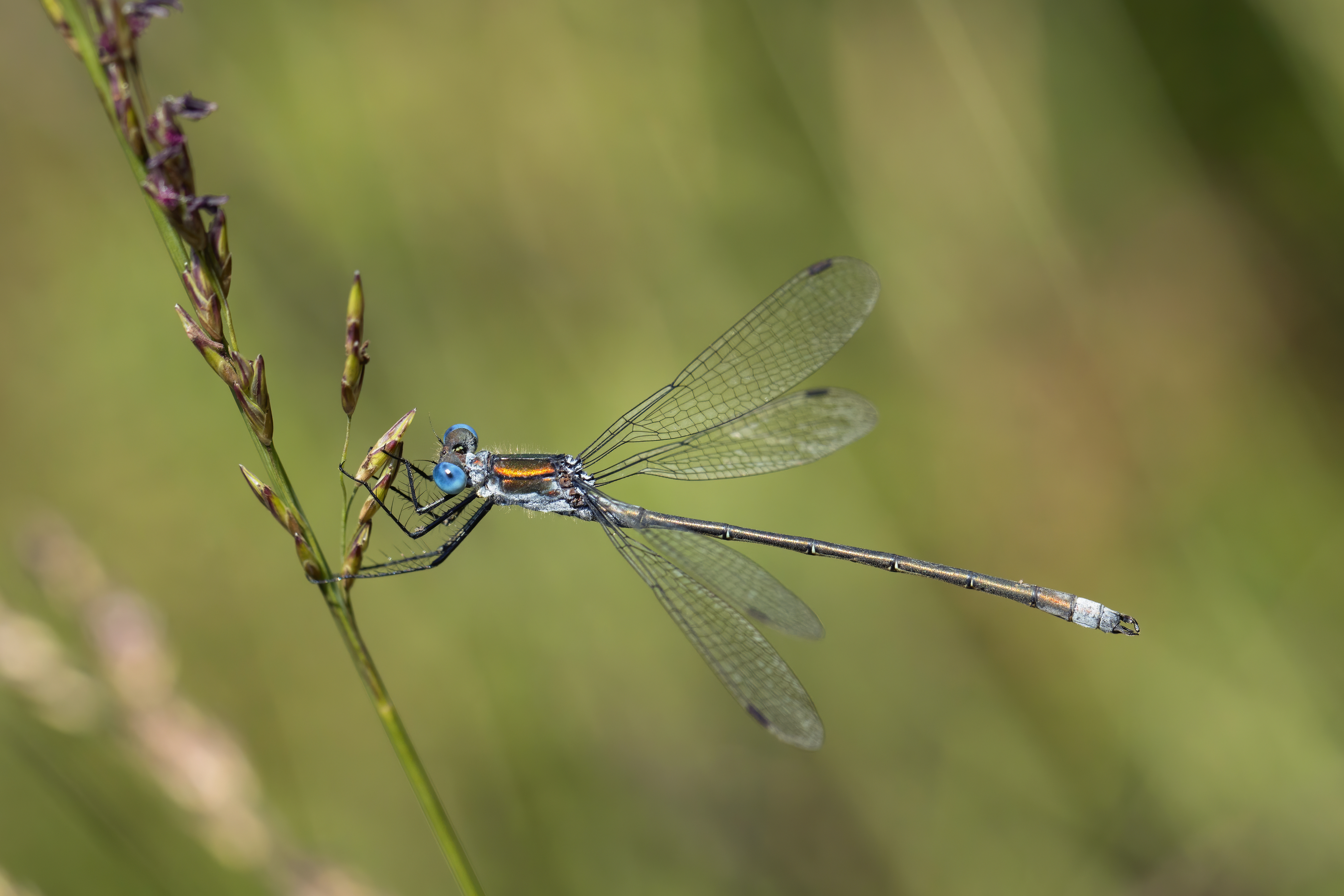
- Male; Warren Heath, Hampshire, England
- Female; RSPB NI Montiagh's Moss, Northern Ireland

Conservation status
- Least Concern (IUCN 3.1)

Scientific classification
- Kingdom: Animalia
- Phylum: Arthropoda
- Clade: Pancrustacea
- Class: Insecta
- Order: Odonata
- Suborder: Zygoptera
- Family: Lestidae
- Genus: Lestes
- Species: L. sponsa

Binomial name
- Lestes sponsa (Hansemann, 1823)

= Lestes sponsa =

Species of damselfly

Lestes sponsa is a damselfly with a wide Palaearctic distribution. It is known commonly as the emerald damselfly or common spreadwing. Both males and females have a metallic green colour and brown wing spots. It resides near pools with aquatic plants. When resting its wings are usually half opened.

== Behaviour ==
One of the larger damselflies, this species is most common in July and August. It is often found by ponds and lakes, and is very rarely seen along flowing water. Emerald damselflies like to perch among reeds, their colour providing good camouflage. They are not as strong fliers when compared to other common damselflies such as the common blue or large red damselflies, but they are more likely to be seen on misty, rainy days than those species. When disturbed they usually do not fly very far away, landing on another perch a few yards away. Their habit of perching with their wings half open is characteristic of the family Lestidae and gives rise to their other common name of spreadwings. A population can consist of several hundred insects.

L. sponsa mate in the usual dragonfly manner and will form tandem pairs away from water. Copulation lasts from 30–60 minutes and after mating they stay paired for egg-laying. However, at high latitudes where the breeding season is brief, the copulation is finished within a shorter time and in general the mating is more intense than at lower latitudes with longer breeding season (i.e., short season compensation in mating behaviour). The female usually lays eggs in submerged vegetation and whilst egg-laying the female can remain submerged for 30 min. The female pierces the tissue of aquatic plants and inserts her eggs. Occasionally females lay their eggs in vegetation above the water surface in places that will become submerged when the water level rises. The eggs start to develop and will continue to develop for the next few weeks. Then the development of the eggs slows down. In this state of slow development, called diapause the eggs overwinter. L. sponsa is an obligatory univoltine species.

The prolarva stage hatches from the egg in spring. This is a specialised short lived stage often lasting only minutes. The prolarva has no limbs and cannot feed but it can move by jumping or wriggling and if a prolarva is not in water when it hatches it will move about until water is found. Once in water the prolarva molt to the second stadia stage. The larvae are active and actively hunt prey leading to rapid larval growth. The larvae molt from one stadia to the next until growth is complete; in dragonflies the larval stages are the only stages where growth occurs. The number of stadia is not fixed and in good conditions the last or final larval stage, called F-0 can be reached in as little as 5 weeks. Seasonally time constrained high latitude populations show faster larval development and growth than less time limited central and low latitude populations, and this to compensate a brief growth season at high latitudes. Furthermore, it was experimentally shown that faster larval growth in time constrained larvae is accompanied by higher activity and feeding efficiency, including cannibalism.

The adults emerge in July and are on the wing until September. Adults are not sexually mature when they emerge and need a week or more, depending on conditions, before they can breed. In L. sponsa in Japan the length of the summer maturation period is correlated with temperature and lasts on average 20 days in the north where it is cooler up to 120 days in the hotter south. This stops egg laying early in summer, which could lead to egg not entering diapause and hatching in autumn. This would disrupt the normal cycle as larva hatched in autumn would not survive the winter.

== Description ==
All species in the genus Lestes are very similar and are hard to separate in the field. The shapes of the anal appendages are characteristic. In L. sponsa the anal appendage is black with the superior appendage (which are the ones on the outside) with two internal teeth. The inferior appendage is elongated and cylindrical. In northern Europe five species of Lestes occur whilst in Europe as a whole there are six species, so identification can be problematical and it is best to look at as many features as possible.

L. sponsa is a typical member of the genus with a green metallic body and wings held away from the body at rest. The abdomen is 26–33 mm (1.0–1.3 in) long and the wings are 19–23 mm (0.75–0.91 in) long. Mature males have a powder blue colour on the prothorax and on segments 1–2 and 9–10 of the abdomen. Mature males have blue eyes. Females lacks the blue colour. Immature males also lack the blue pruinescence and have greeny brown eyes. The pterostigmata of immature males are almost white.

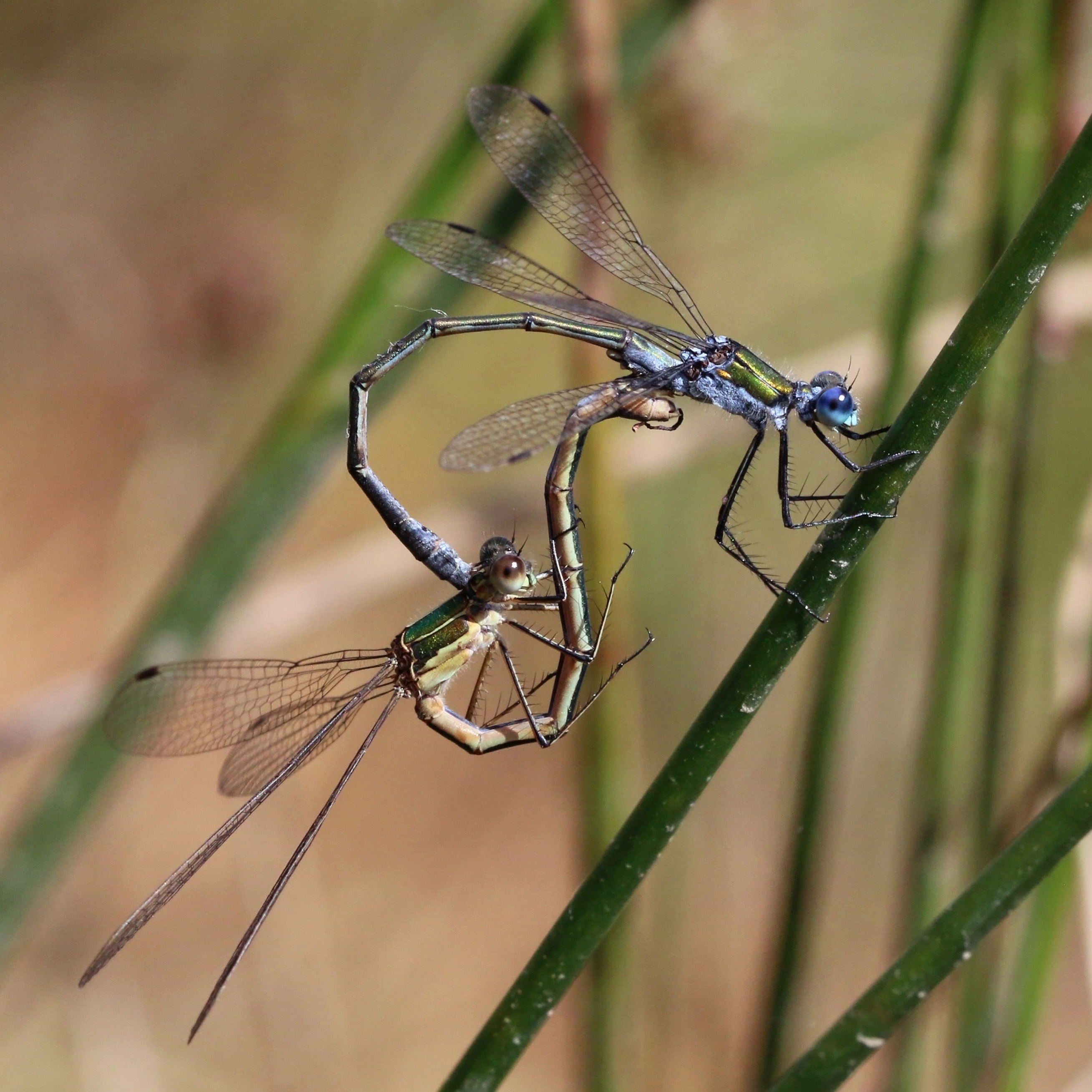
Mating

Ovipositing

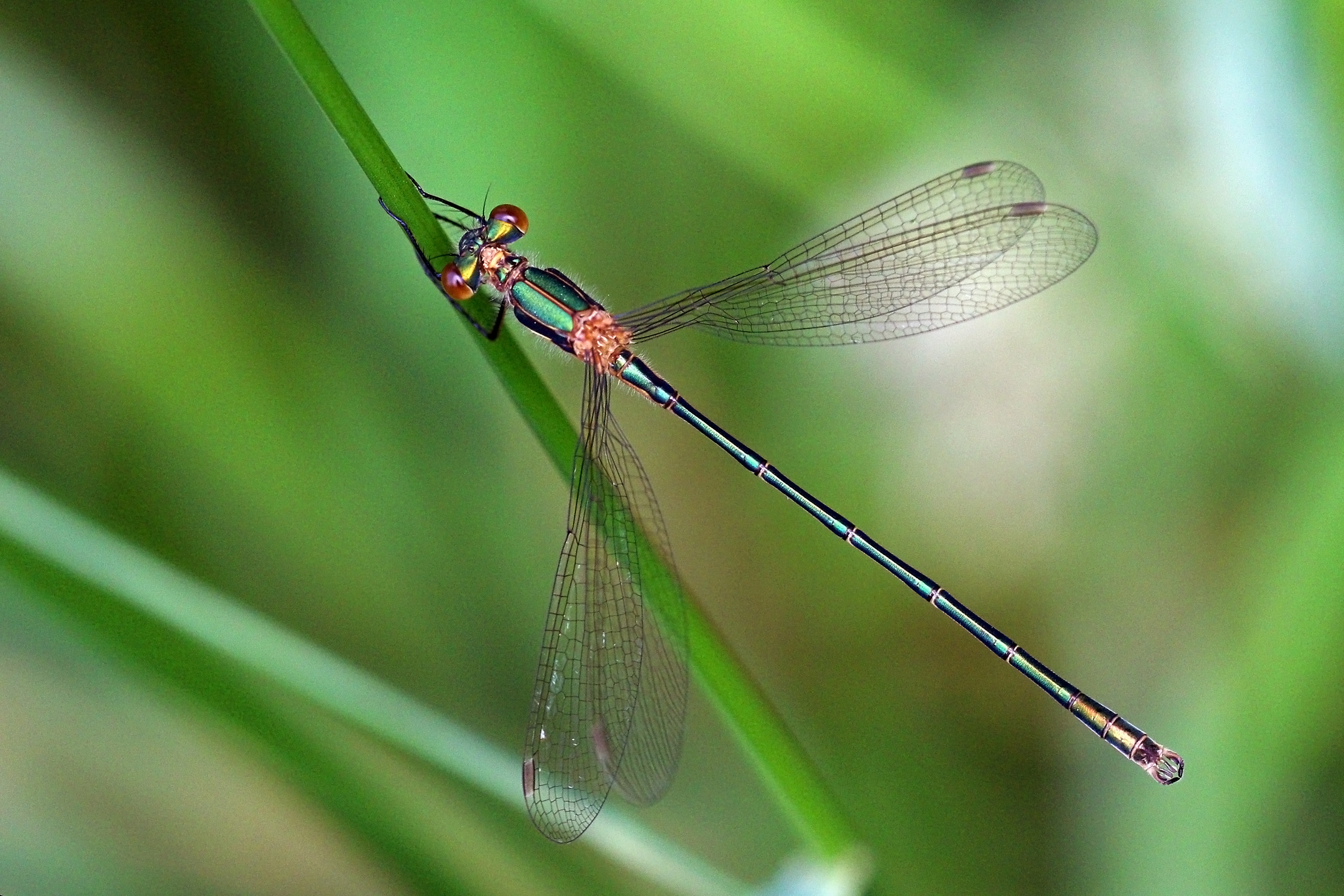
Immature male

== Habitat and distribution ==
Preferred habitats of this species are pools, ponds and moorlands, it is a species of still or very slow flowing water. The emerald damselfly has a large Palaeartic distribution, and is found in a band across central Europe and Asia from Spain to the Pacific. It is not found in the far north in Europe and Asia or in the extreme south, being absent from southern Spain, southern Italy and Greece. It probably occurs in some areas of north Africa; where it occurs around the Mediterranean it is found at altitude. In Great Britain it is the only Lestes species that is common.

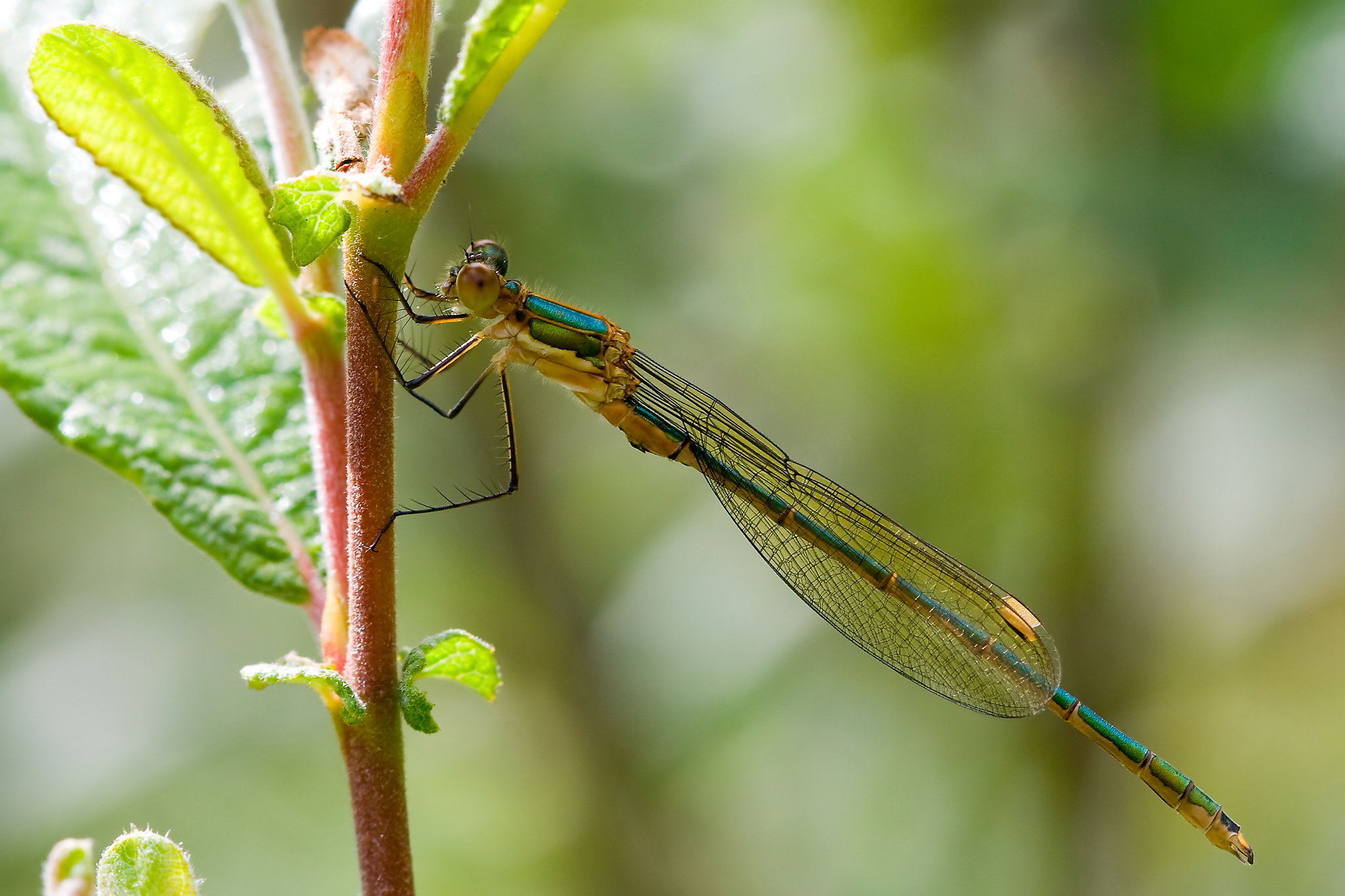
L. sponsa immature male with white pterostigma and green/brown eyes

== See also ==
- List of damselflies of the world (Lestidae)
- Lestes dryas
- Lestes barbarus
- Lestes virens
- Lestes macrostigma
- Chalcolestes viridis (formerly Lestes viridis)
- Chalcolestes parvidens (formerly Lestes parvidens)
