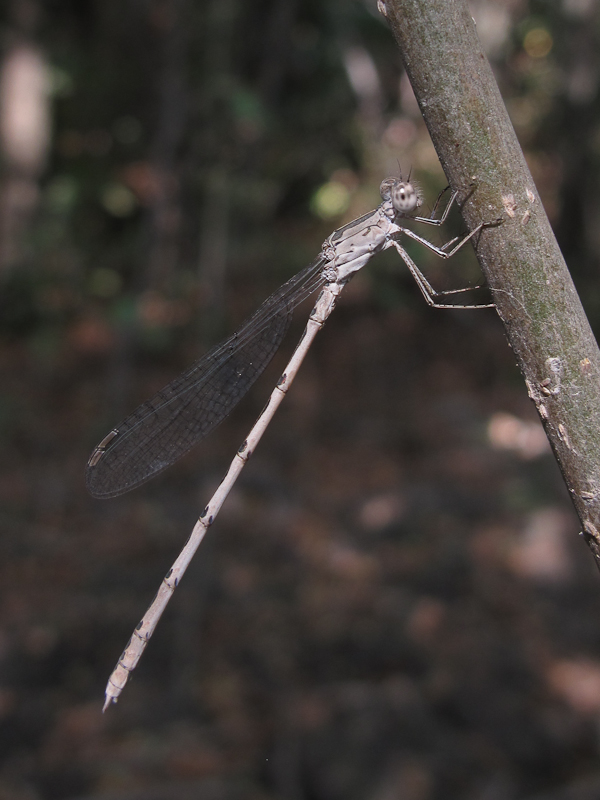

Scientific classification
- Kingdom: Animalia
- Phylum: Arthropoda
- Class: Insecta
- Order: Odonata
- Suborder: Zygoptera
- Family: Lestidae
- Genus: Sympecma
- Species: S. gobica

Binomial name
- Sympecma gobica Förster, 1900

= Sympecma gobica =

Species of damselfly

Sympecma gobica is a species of spreadwing in the damselfly family Lestidae. Other species frequently misidentified as this species.
