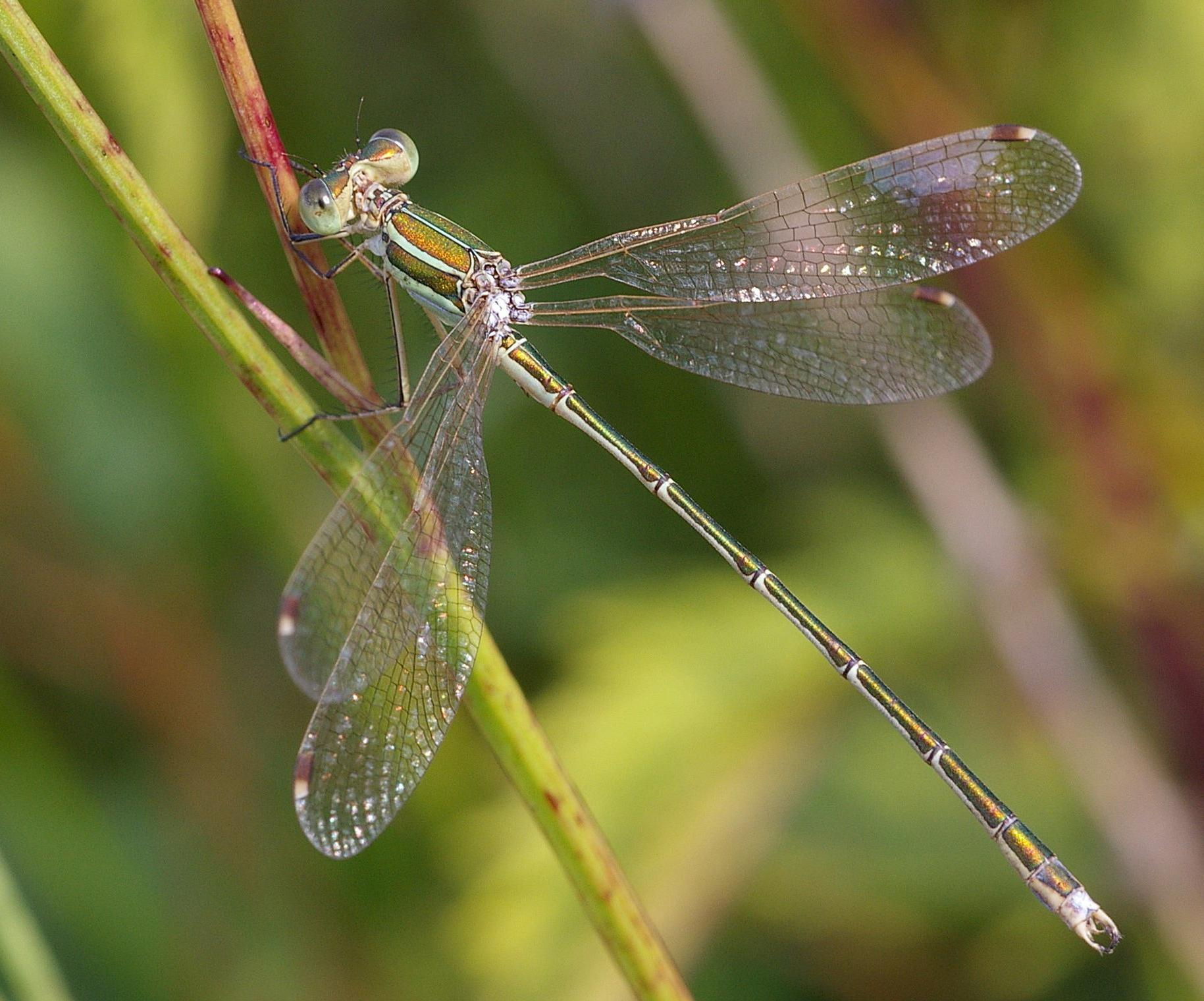
- Male
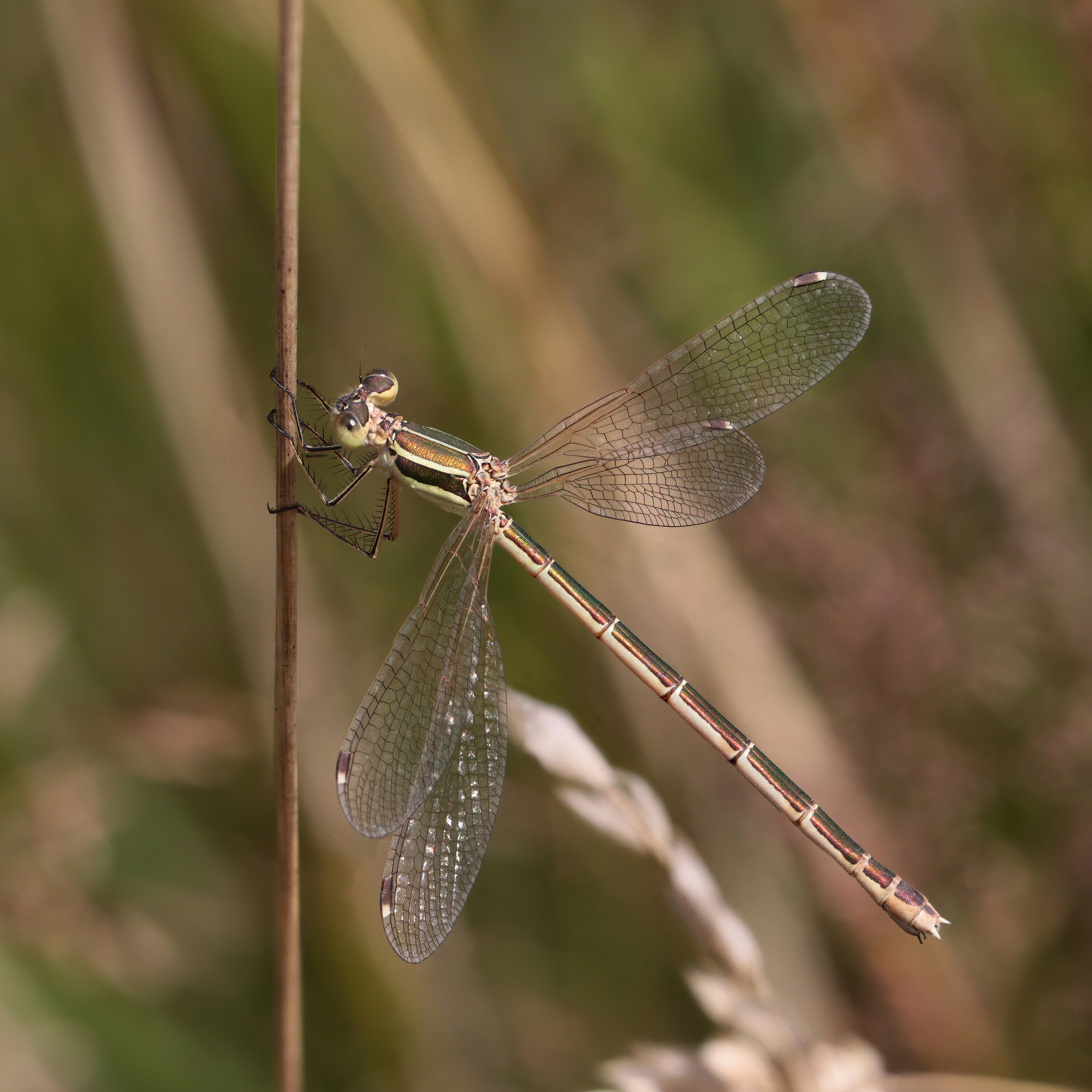
- Female

Conservation status
- Least Concern (IUCN 3.1)

Scientific classification
- Kingdom: Animalia
- Phylum: Arthropoda
- Class: Insecta
- Order: Odonata
- Suborder: Zygoptera
- Family: Lestidae
- Genus: Lestes
- Species: L. barbarus

Binomial name
- Lestes barbarus (Fabricius, 1798)

Synonyms
- Agrion barbara Fabricius, 1798; Agrion nympha Hansemann, 1823

= Lestes barbarus =

Species of damselfly

Lestes barbarus is a species of damselfly of the family Lestidae, the spreadwings. Its common names in English include southern emerald damselfly, shy emerald damselfly, and migrant spreadwing.

== Distribution and habitat ==
Lestes barbarus is a European–central Asian species with isolated populations in North Africa and a range expanding northward. It is found across southern Europe in a band across Spain, France, Italy and Greece to India and Mongolia. It is less common in northern Europe, although some are found as far north as Sweden. It breeds in the Netherlands in coastal dunes and is increasing in number. It is at the edge of its range in the Channel Islands, where it has been breeding since 1995. It is also found in North Africa; it gets its Latin name as the first specimen was found in Barbary, North Africa. It is a damselfly of still water and can be found in stagnant and slightly brackish water.

This species was first recorded in Britain at Winterton Dunes, Norfolk, on 30 July 2002. In 2003 and 2004 it was noted at Sandwich Bay, Kent. In 2018 it was proven to have bred in Britain for the first time.

== Identification ==
This species has the typical appearance of a Lestes damselfly with a metallic green body and wings held away from the body at rest. It differs from the other European Lestes in having bicoloured pterostigmata, which is diagnostic. The male abdominal appendage and female ovipositor are also characteristic and unlike those of L. sponsa or L. dryas.

Immatures have pale pterostigmata and only develop the characteristic two-coloured pterostigmata when mature.

== Behaviour ==
The flight period is from March to October in the south of its range but in north it flies mainly from June to August. Its behaviour is similar to that of L. sponsa, but it is more likely to be found away from water. After mating the pair usually remain in tandem while the female lays eggs on waterside plants. The eggs overwinter in diapause and the larvae hatch in spring. The larvae develop within two months, the adults emerging in late spring.

== See also ==
- List of damselflies of the world (Lestidae)
