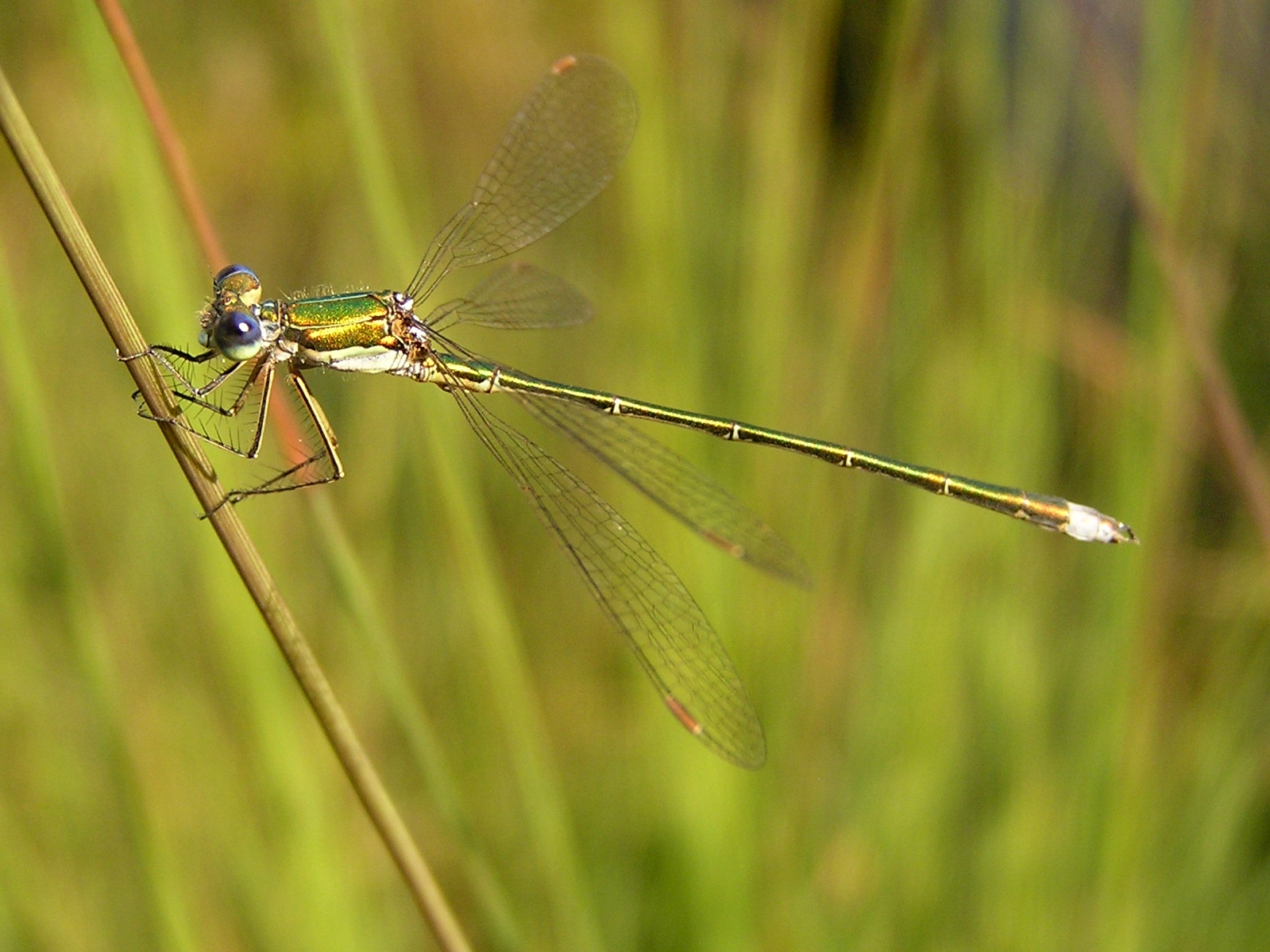

Scientific classification
- Domain: Eukaryota
- Kingdom: Animalia
- Phylum: Arthropoda
- Class: Insecta
- Order: Odonata
- Suborder: Zygoptera
- Family: Lestidae
- Genus: Lestes
- Species: L. virens

Binomial name
- Lestes virens (Charpentier, 1825)

= Lestes virens =

Species of damselfly

Lestes virens is a species of damselfly in the family Lestidae, the spreadwings. It is known commonly as the small spreadwing or small emerald spreadwing. It is native to much of Europe and western and central Asia.

== Distribution and habitat ==
There are two subspecies. The subspecies L. v. virens is found in the south of the range in Spain, southern France, Sardinia and North Africa. L. v. vestalis is found in the north in northern France, Italy, and across central Europe. It is not found in northern Europe or in the United Kingdom. It is a damselfly of still waters and is found in lakes, ponds, ditches and bogs with abundant vegetation.

== Identification ==
Lestes virens looks very similar to the other members of the genus Lestes. It has a metallic green body and at rest holds its wings away from its body. L. virens is smaller than L. sponsa. It has a pale brown pterostigma edged laterally with white and its anal appendages are pale to yellowish. L. sponsa and L. dryas both have black anal appendages.

In L. v. virens the yellow line which runs along the humeral suture is unbroken and almost reaches the base of the forewing, whereas in L. v. vestalis the yellow line is reduced and broken and does not reach the forewing. L. v. virens is found in the south of its range and L. v. vestalis is found in the north. The separation of L. virens into two subspecies has been called into question.

== Behaviour ==
The flight period is generally from June to September, but it may start as early as April in the south of its range. L. virens lives in the dense vegetation on the edge of ponds where it feeds, mates, and lays eggs. It is a univoltine species. After mating the female lays its eggs above water on plant stems, the eggs go through a period of rapid development and then enter diapause. They overwinter as developed eggs and then the larvae emerge in spring. The larvae develop very quickly.

== Gallery ==
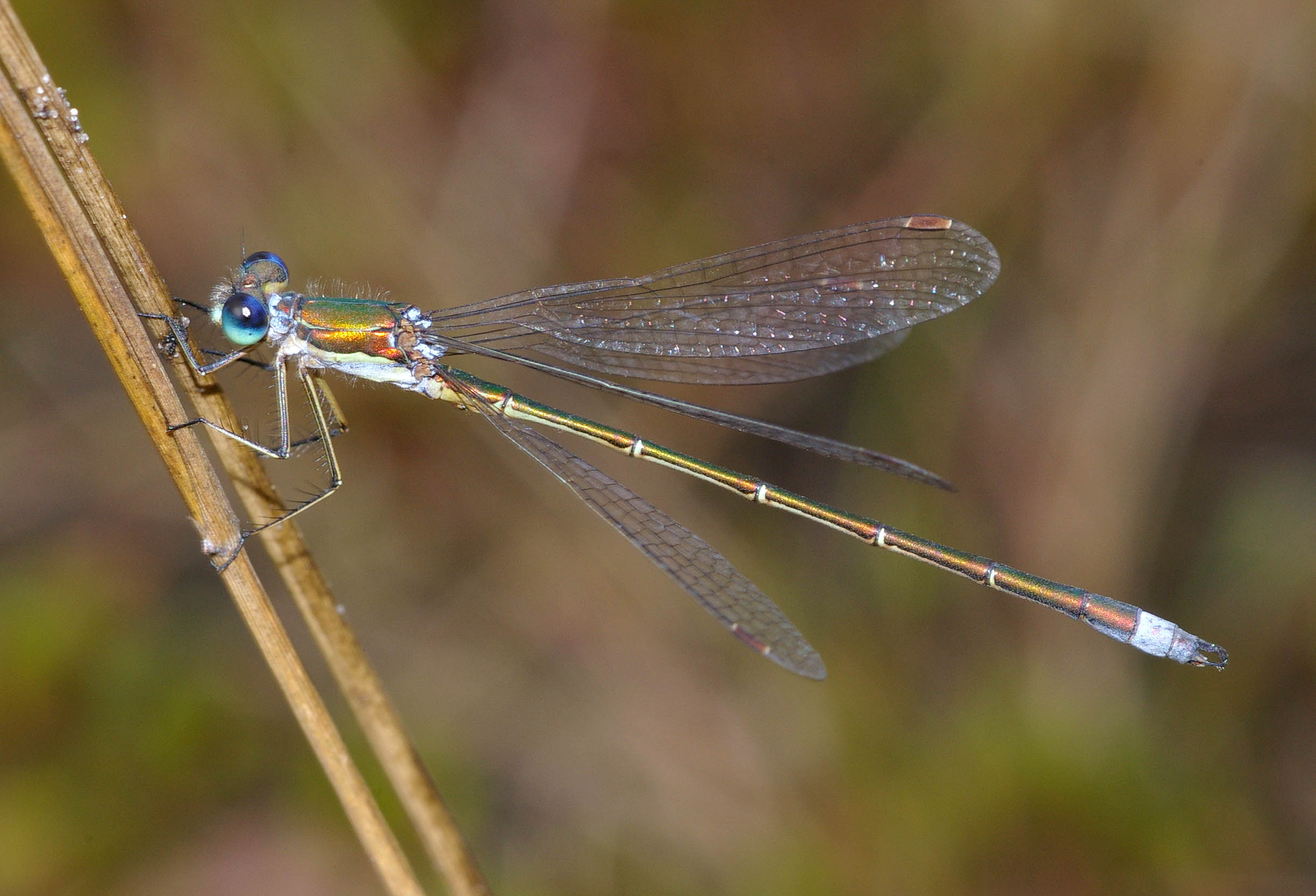
Lestes virens vestalis male

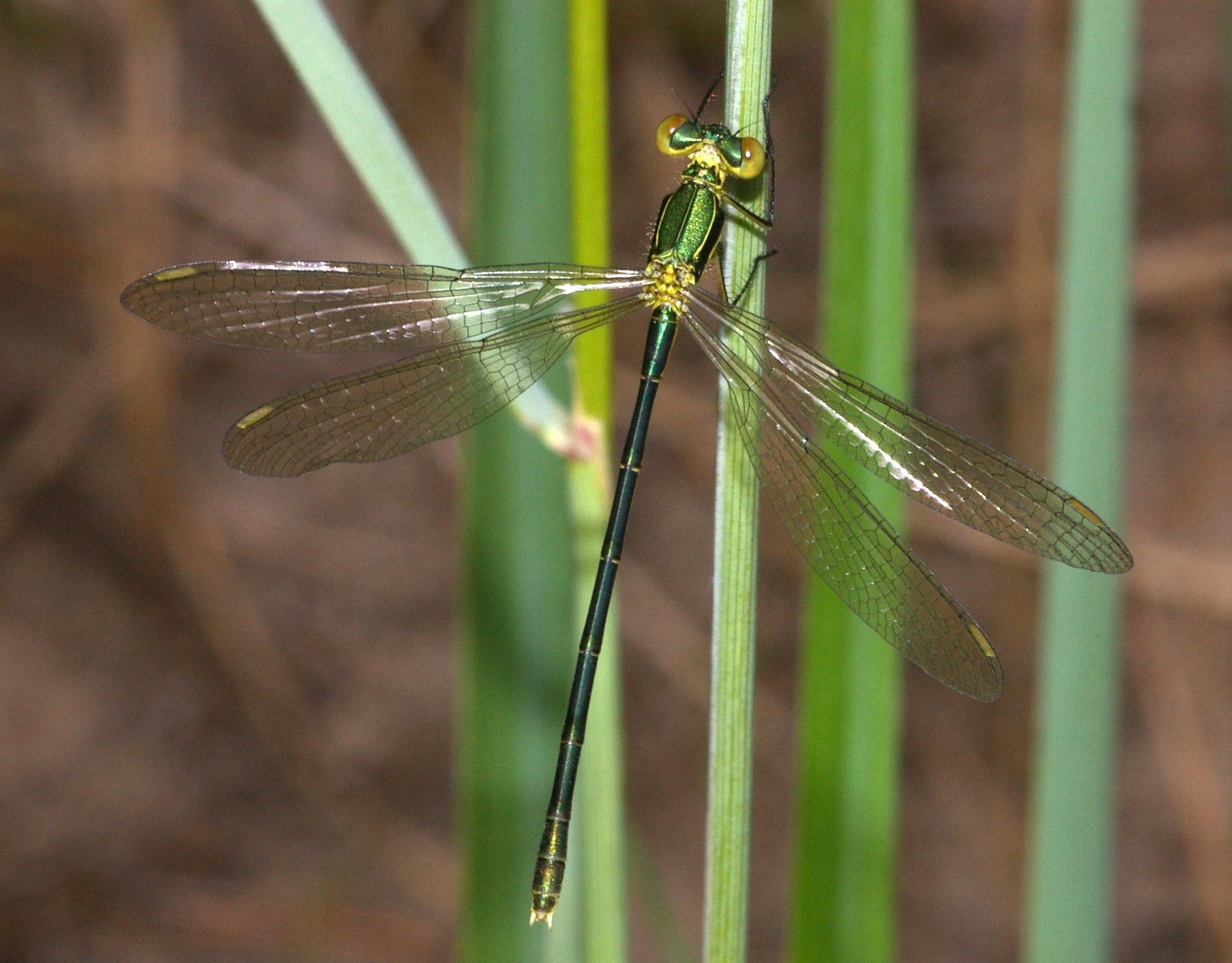
Female

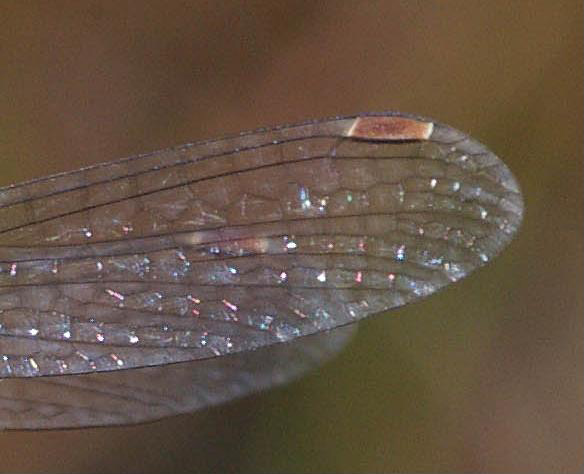
Wing showing pale brown pterostigma edged with white

== See also ==
- List of damselflies of the world (Lestidae)
