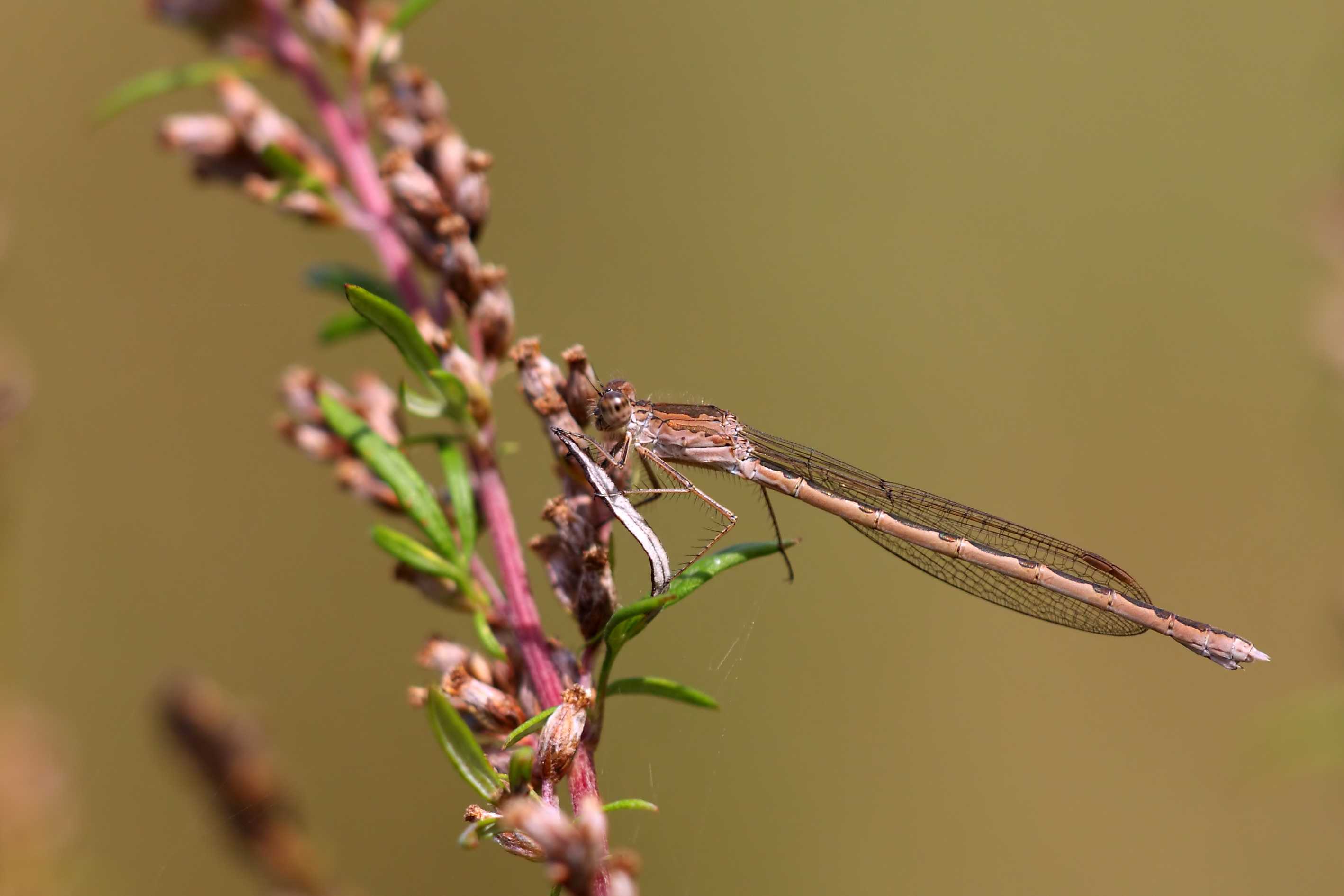

Conservation status
- Least Concern (IUCN 3.1)

Scientific classification
- Kingdom: Animalia
- Phylum: Arthropoda
- Class: Insecta
- Order: Odonata
- Suborder: Zygoptera
- Family: Lestidae
- Genus: Sympecma
- Species: S. paedisca

Binomial name
- Sympecma paedisca (Brauer, 1877)

= Sympecma paedisca =

Species of damselfly

Sympecma paedisca, known generally as siberian winterdamsel, is a species of spreadwing in the damselfly family Lestidae. It is found in Europe.

The IUCN conservation status of Sympecma paedisca is "LC", least concern, with no immediate threat to the species' survival. The IUCN status was reviewed in 2014.
