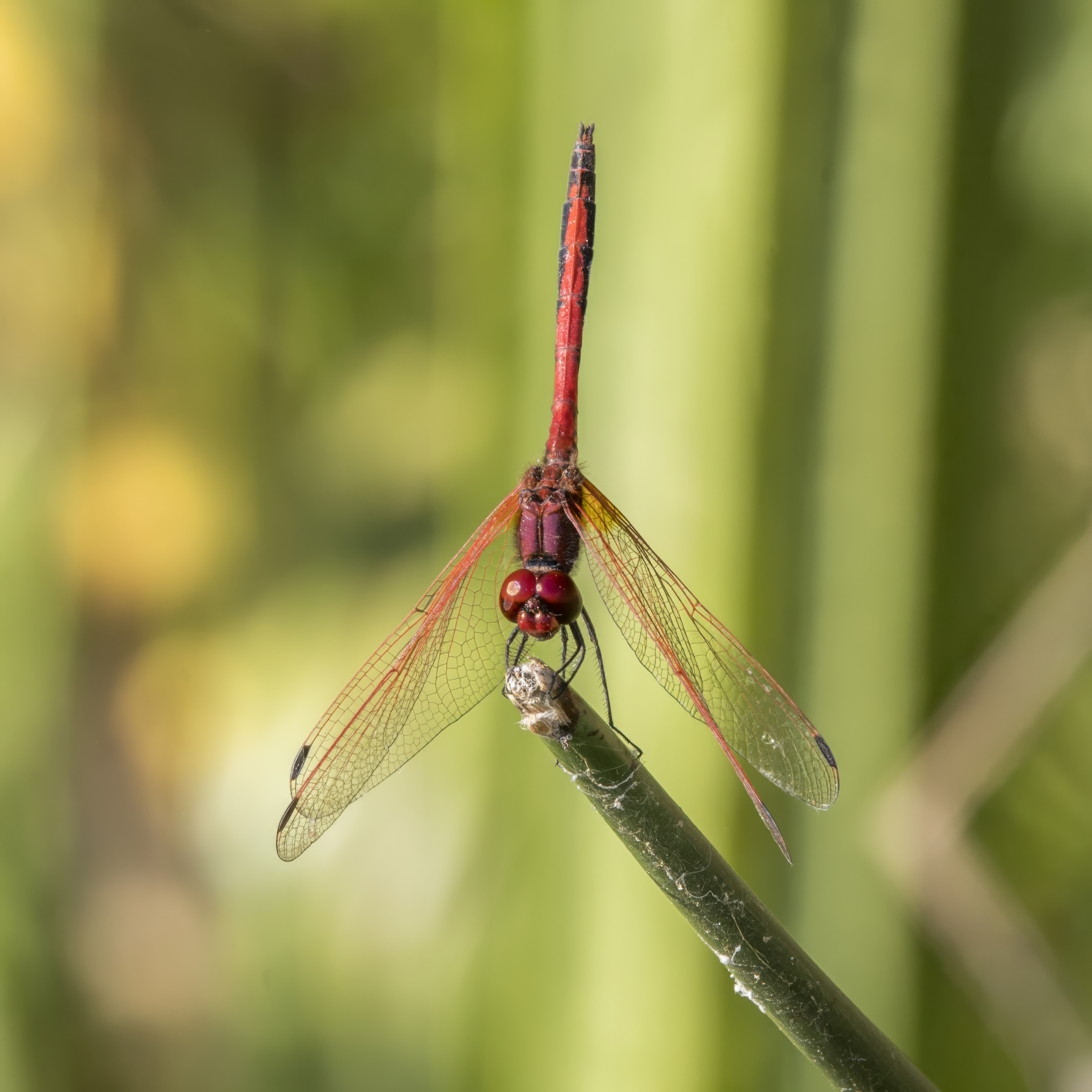
- Male
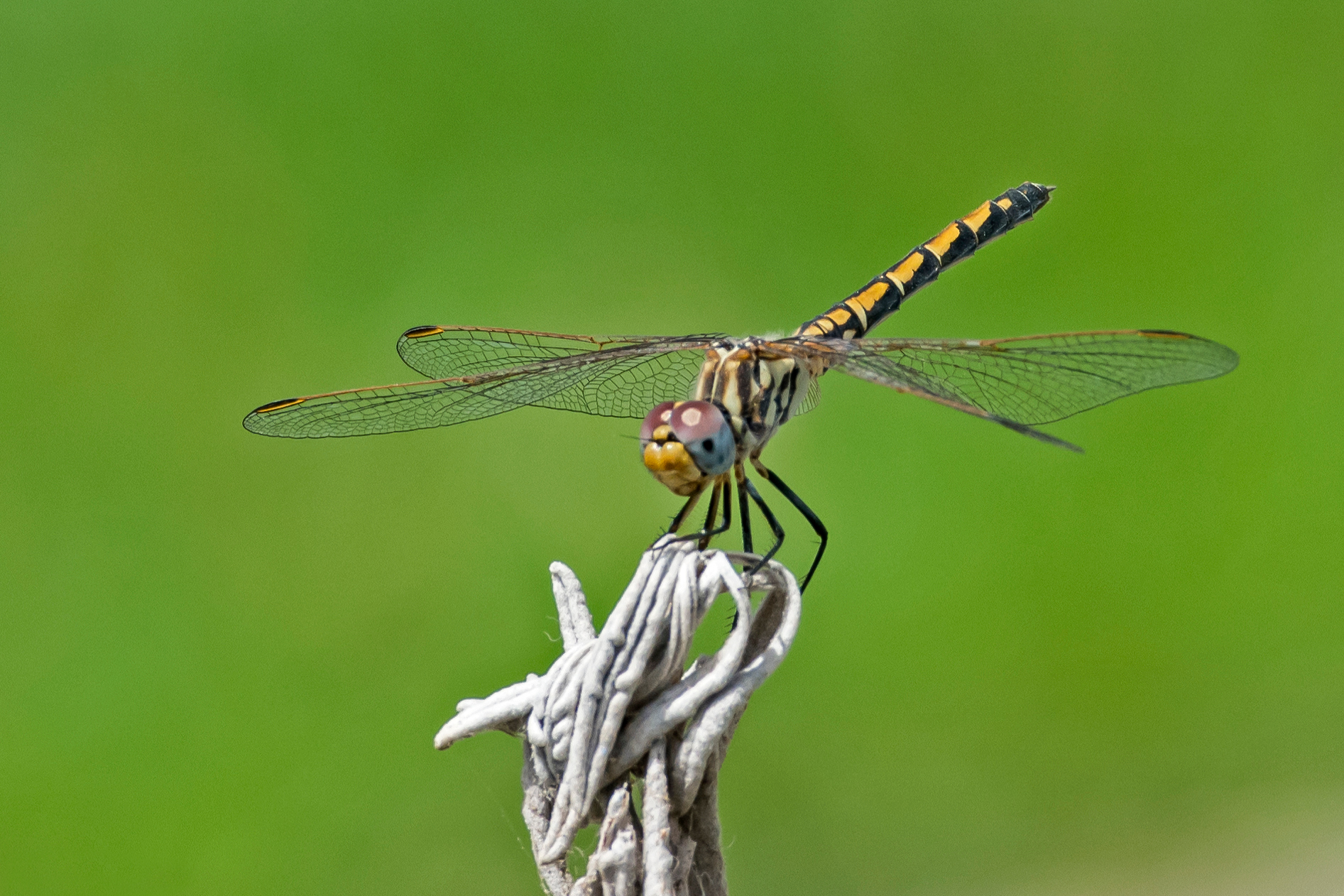
- Female

Conservation status
- Least Concern (IUCN 3.1)

Scientific classification
- Kingdom: Animalia
- Phylum: Arthropoda
- Class: Insecta
- Order: Odonata
- Infraorder: Anisoptera
- Family: Libellulidae
- Genus: Trithemis
- Species: T. arteriosa

Binomial name
- Trithemis arteriosa (Burmeister, 1839)

= Trithemis arteriosa =

Species of dragonfly

Trithemis arteriosa, the red-veined dropwing, is a species of dragonfly in the family Libellulidae.

== Distribution and status ==
Trithemis arteriosa is widespread and common in most of its range which includes most of Africa and extends to western Asia and southern Europe. In Africa, it is found in Algeria, Angola, Benin, Botswana, Burkina Faso, Burundi, Cameroon, Canary Islands, Cape Verde, Central African Republic, Chad, Comoros, Congo, Democratic Republic of the Congo, Egypt, Equatorial Guinea, Eritrea, Eswatini, Ethiopia, Gabon, Gambia, Ghana, Guinea, Guinea-Bissau, Ivory Coast, Kenya, Lesotho, Liberia, Libya, Madagascar, Malawi, Mali, Mauritania, Mayotte, Morocco, Mozambique, Namibia, Niger, Nigeria, Rwanda, São Tomé and Príncipe, Senegal, Seychelles, Sierra Leone, Somalia, South Africa, South Sudan, Sudan, Tanzania, Togo, Tunisia, Uganda, Zambia, and Zimbabwe. In western Asia and southern Europe, it is found in Crete, Cyprus, Iran, Israel, Jordan, Kuwait, Lebanon, Oman, Palestinian Territory, Saudi Arabia, Syria, Turkey, United Arab Emirates, and Yemen.

== Habitat ==
This dragonfly is found in and near a wide variety of slow-flowing and still-water habitats. These include streams, rivers, intermittent rivers, freshwater lakes, intermittent freshwater lakes, freshwater marshes, intermittent freshwater marshes, irrigation canals and ditches.

== Description ==
The face of the mature male is deep red, the vertex and top of the frons having a purple sheen. The eyes are deep red and the labium deep yellow with a dark brown stripe in the centre. The synthorax is red with black stripes; mature males often have a purple bloom on the upper thorax. The wings have bright red veins and orange makings at their bases. The pterostigmata are 2.3-2.4 mm long and dark brown. The slender abdomen is bright red; S6-S8 have black wedges on each side; S9 and S10 are black. Females have similar markings, but the abdomen and face are yellow to yellowish brown. The sides of the synthorax are pale yellow-brown, as are the lower sides of S1-S3.

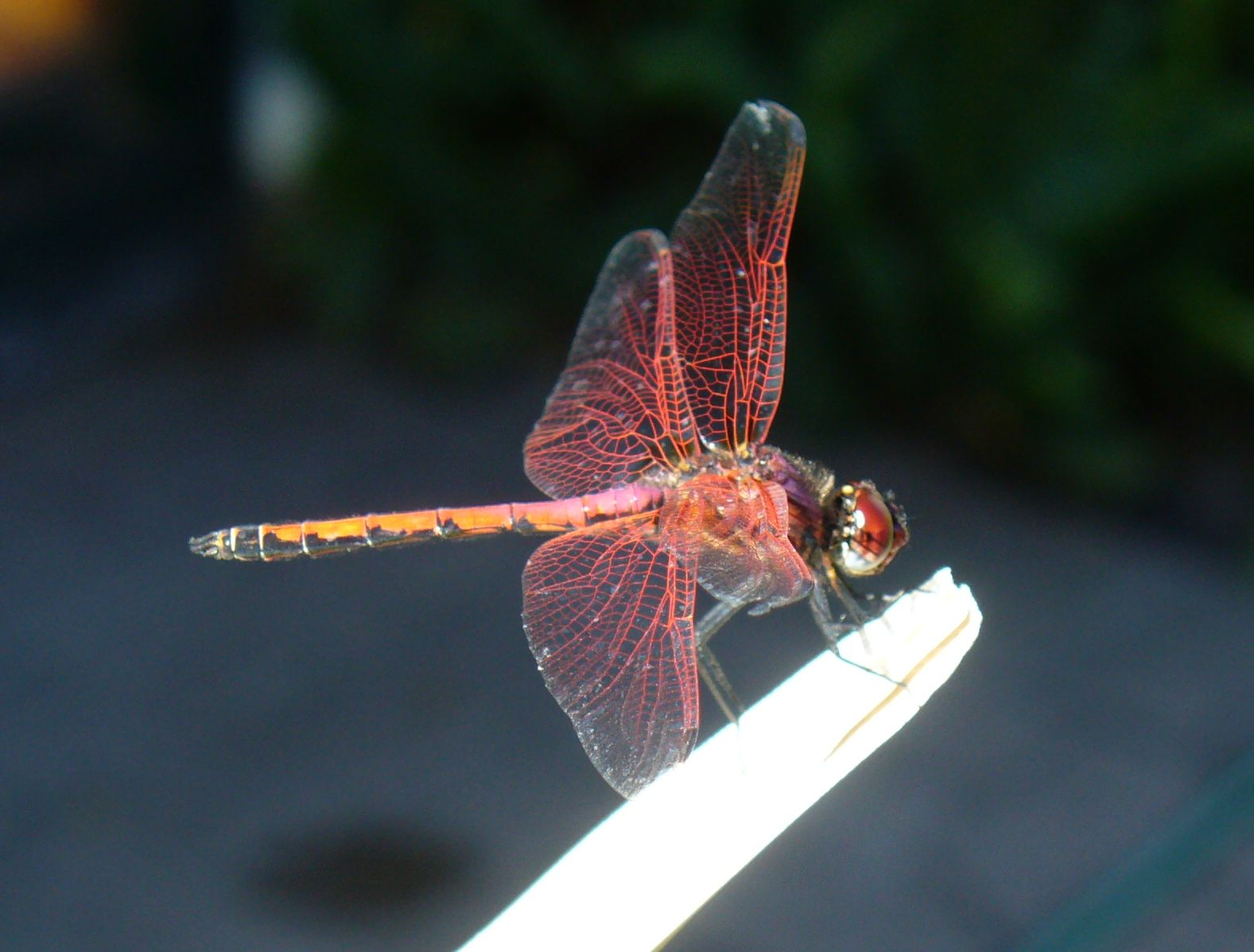
Male

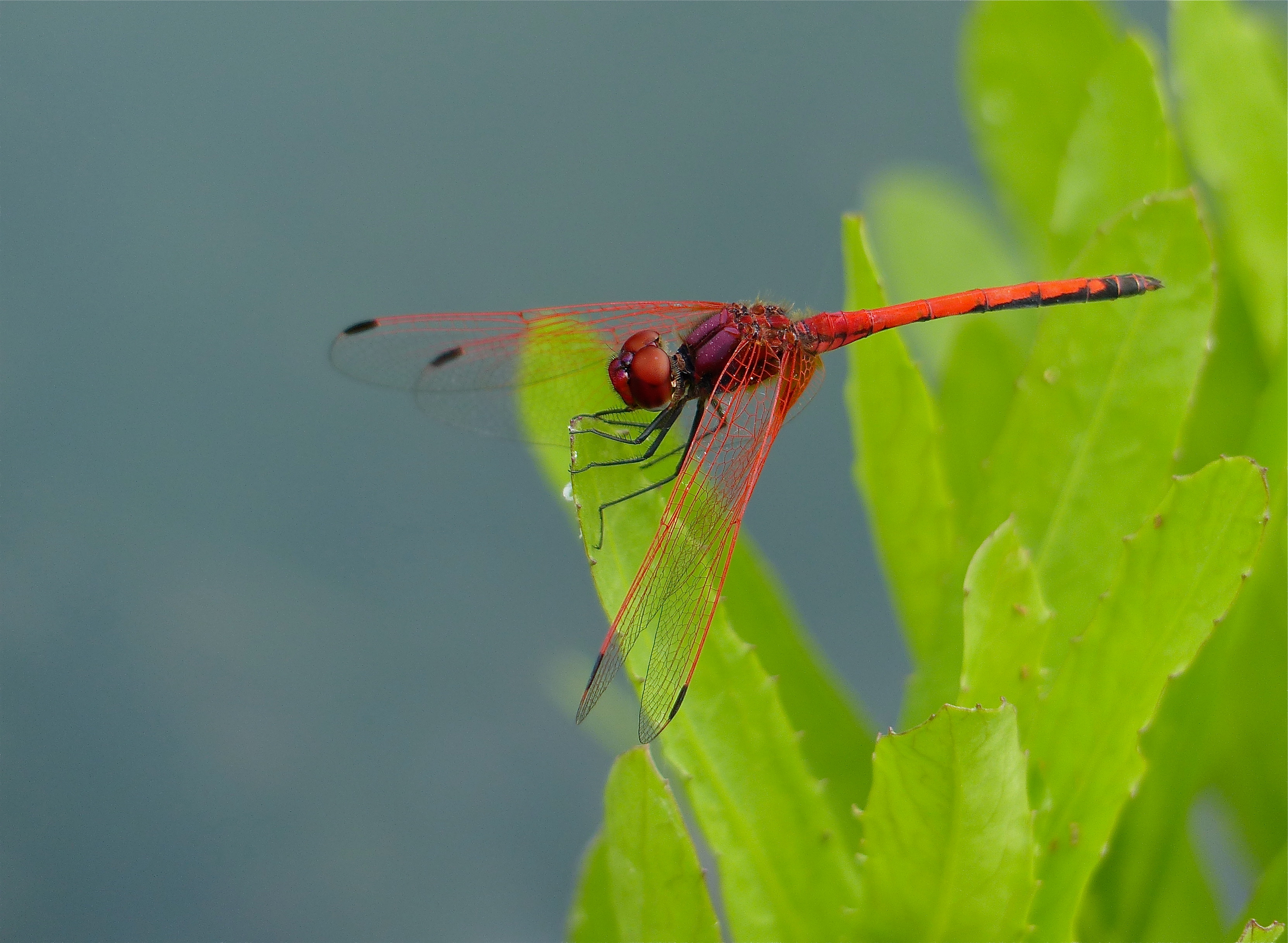
Male

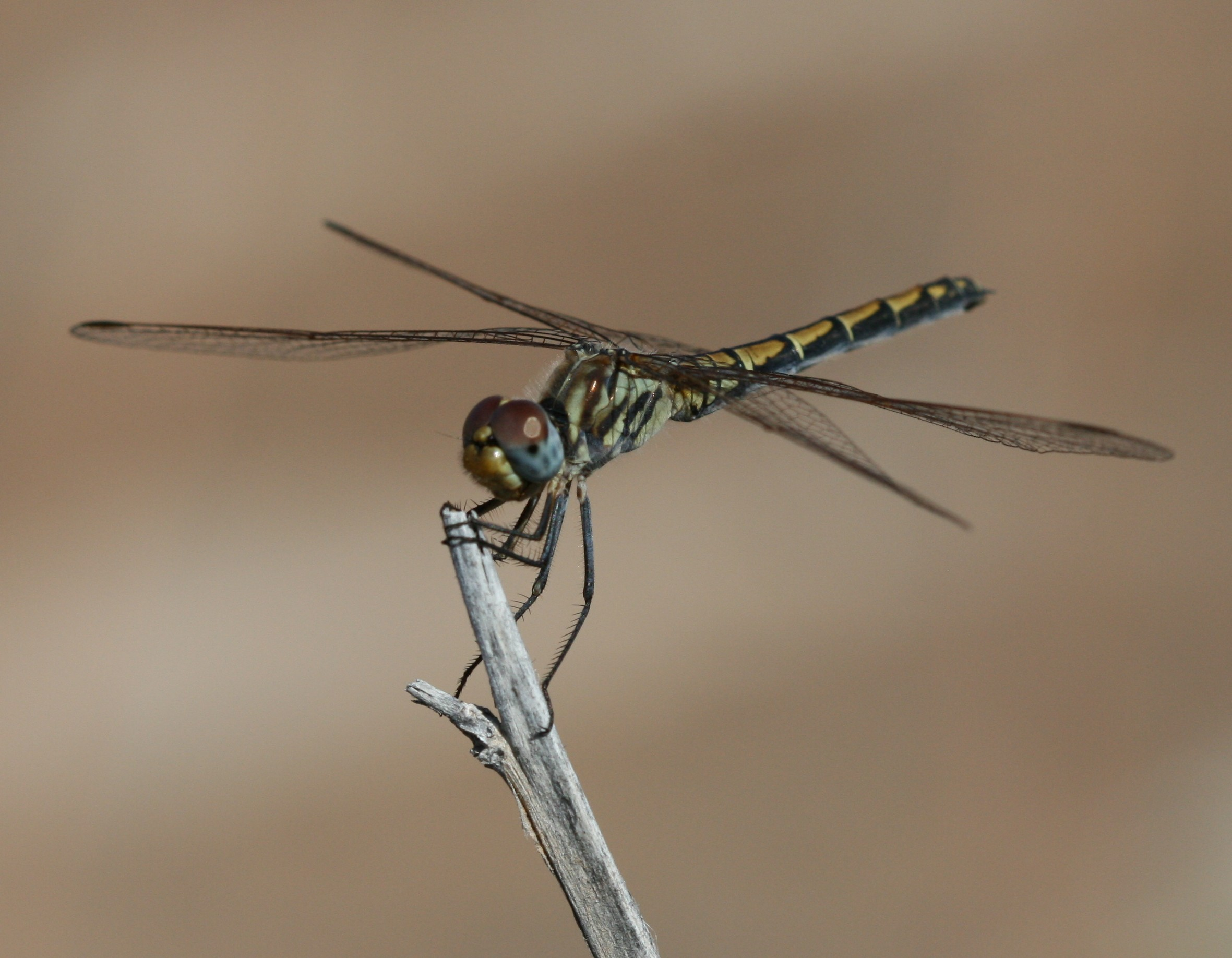
Female

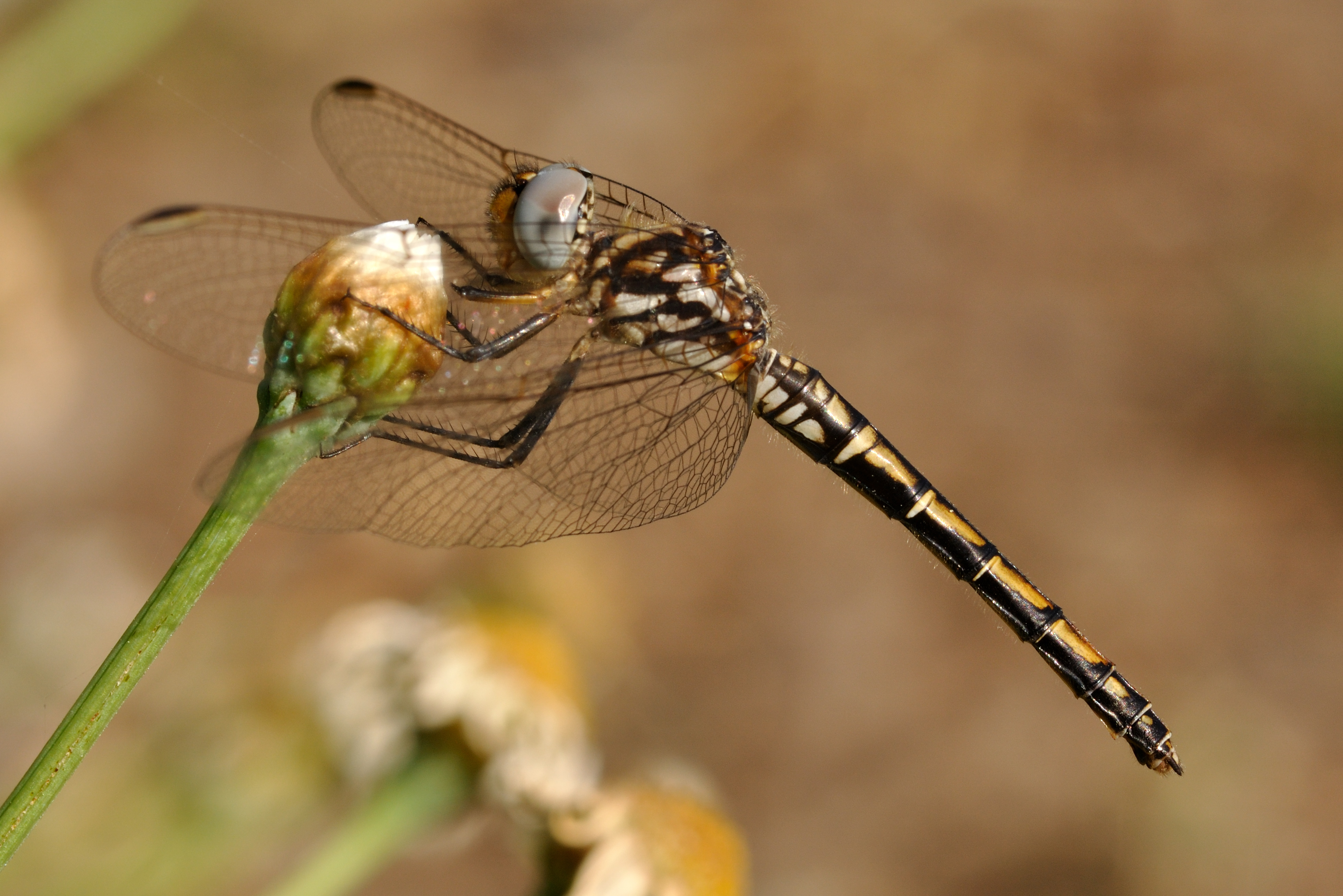
Female

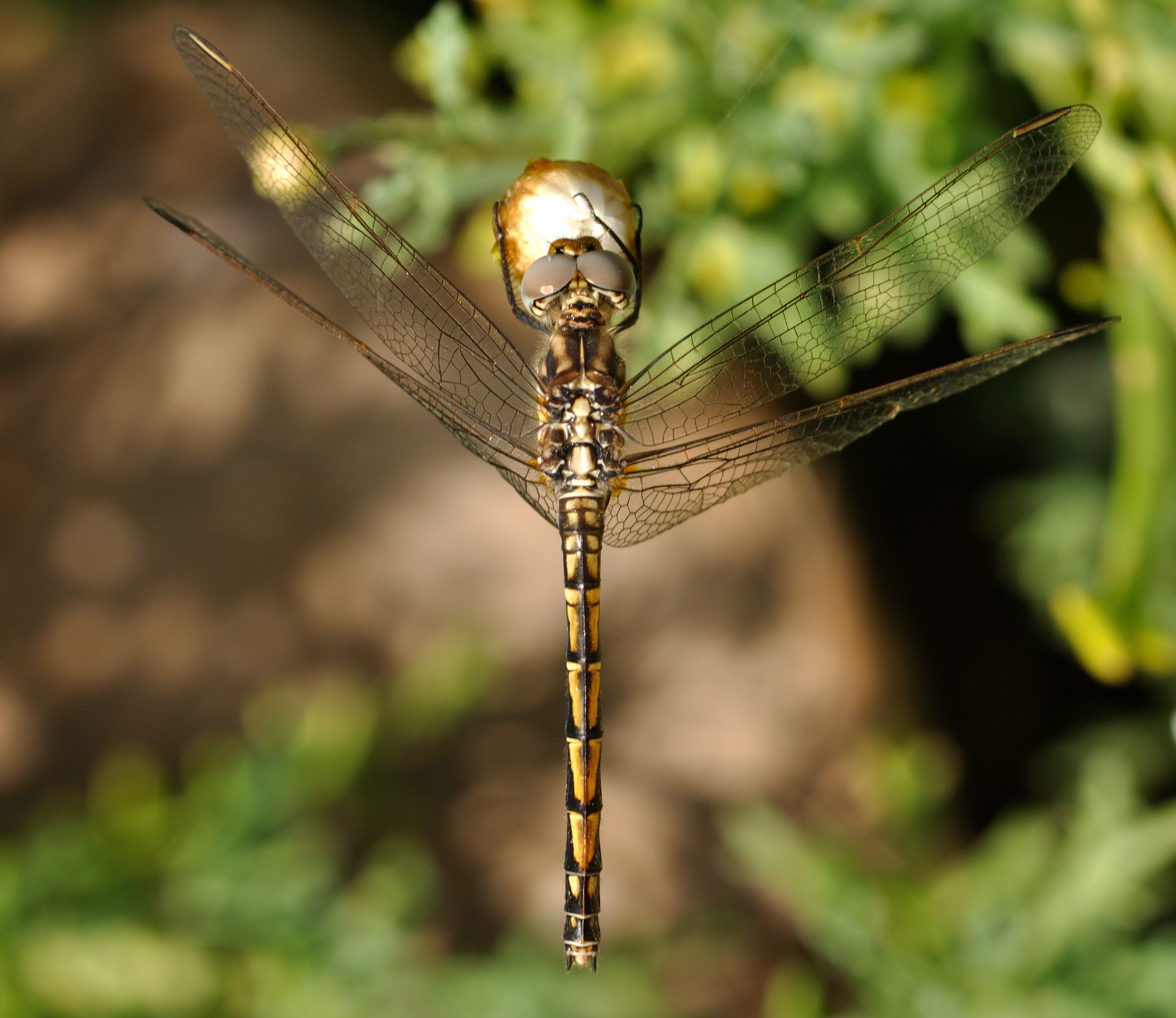
Female
