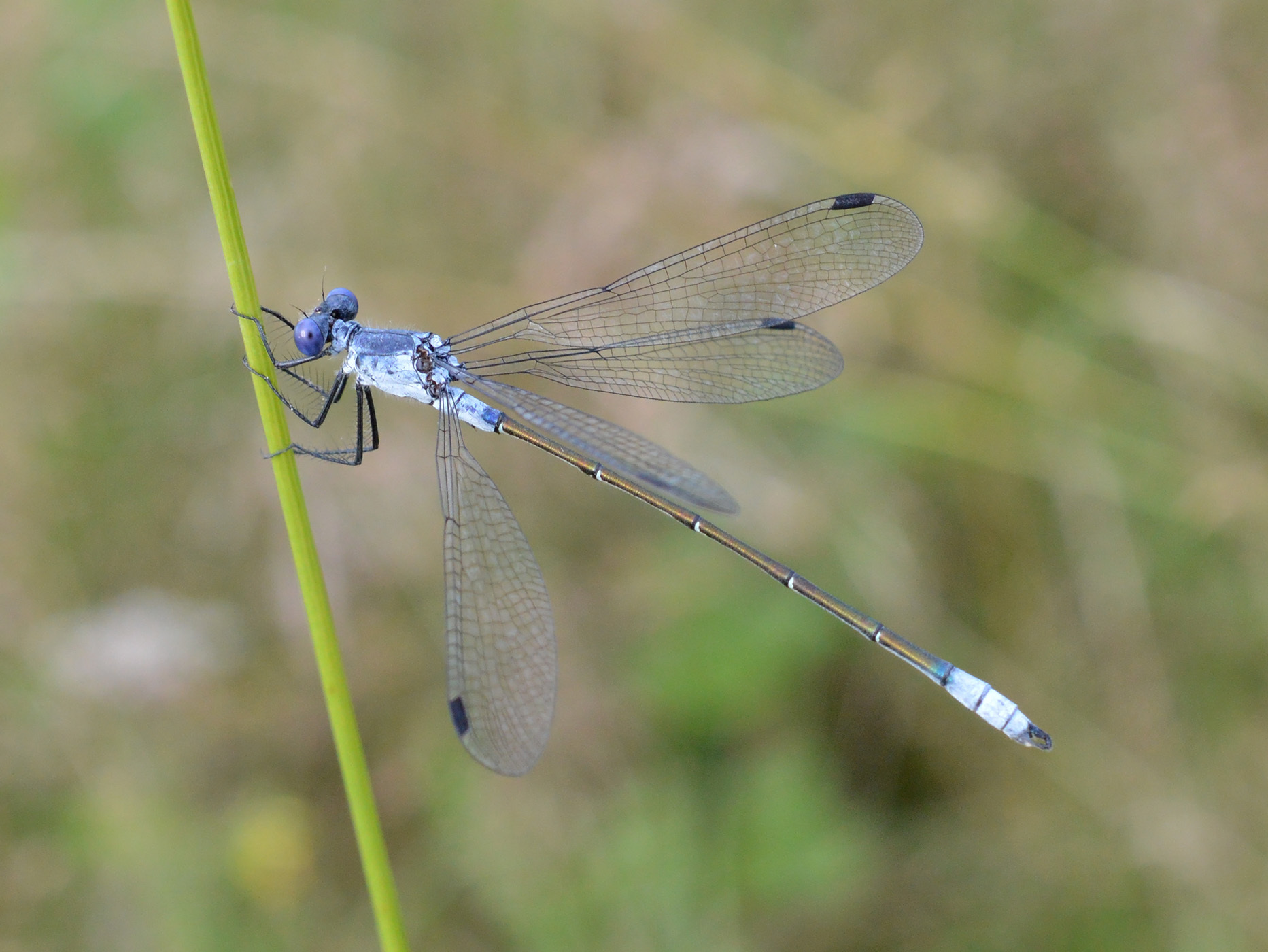

Conservation status
- Least Concern (IUCN 3.1)

Scientific classification
- Domain: Eukaryota
- Kingdom: Animalia
- Phylum: Arthropoda
- Class: Insecta
- Order: Odonata
- Suborder: Zygoptera
- Family: Lestidae
- Genus: Lestes
- Species: L. macrostigma

Binomial name
- Lestes macrostigma (Eversmann, 1836)

= Lestes macrostigma =

Species of damselfly

Lestes macrostigma is a species of damselfly of the family Lestidae, the spreadwings. It is known by the common name dark spreadwing. It is native to much of southern Europe, its distribution extending into western Asia.

== Description ==
This species is up to 48 millimeters long. It is similar to other common Lestes species but it is darker in color with more blue pruinescence. The pterostigmata are large and black.

== Distribution ==
This species has a wide distribution extending from the western coastlines of Europe into Central Asia and the Middle East. Much of its European range is in the Mediterranean. Its distribution is fragmented. It is more abundant in the eastern parts of its range, but abundance varies according to climate and weather. In some areas it is common and in others it is rare and sometimes endangered.

It is most common around brackish waters, like coastal estuaries and salty inland lakes.

== Biology ==
This species has often been noted to lay its eggs on saltmarsh bulrush (Bolboschoenus maritimus). It will also utilize sea bulrush (Juncus maritimus) and common clubrush (Schoenoplectus lacustris).

After mating, the female usually seeks oviposition sites with the male still attached to her. She then lays a line of eggs in the fibers of the aquatic plant. The ovipositor has a cutting implement and sensory setae.

== See also ==
- List of damselflies of the world (Lestidae)
