= List of Odonata species of Israel =

In Israel, 67 species of Odonata species have been recorded, belonging to eight different families. Israel is located at the crossroads of three continents and contains a wide variety of biomes concentrated in a small area; as a result, a relatively high diversity of Odonata species is observed despite its small size.

Due to extensive development in the region, many species are threatened. Notably, the Hula Lake drainage project led to the disappearance of several species that have not been observed in Israel since (such as Calopteryx hyalina, Urothemis edwardsii, and Rhyothemis semihyalina).

In 2015, the Academy of the Hebrew Language introduced Hebrew names for all species recorded in the country at the time, based on their morphology, coloration, or behavior.

== Damselflies (Zygoptera) ==
=== Lestidae ===
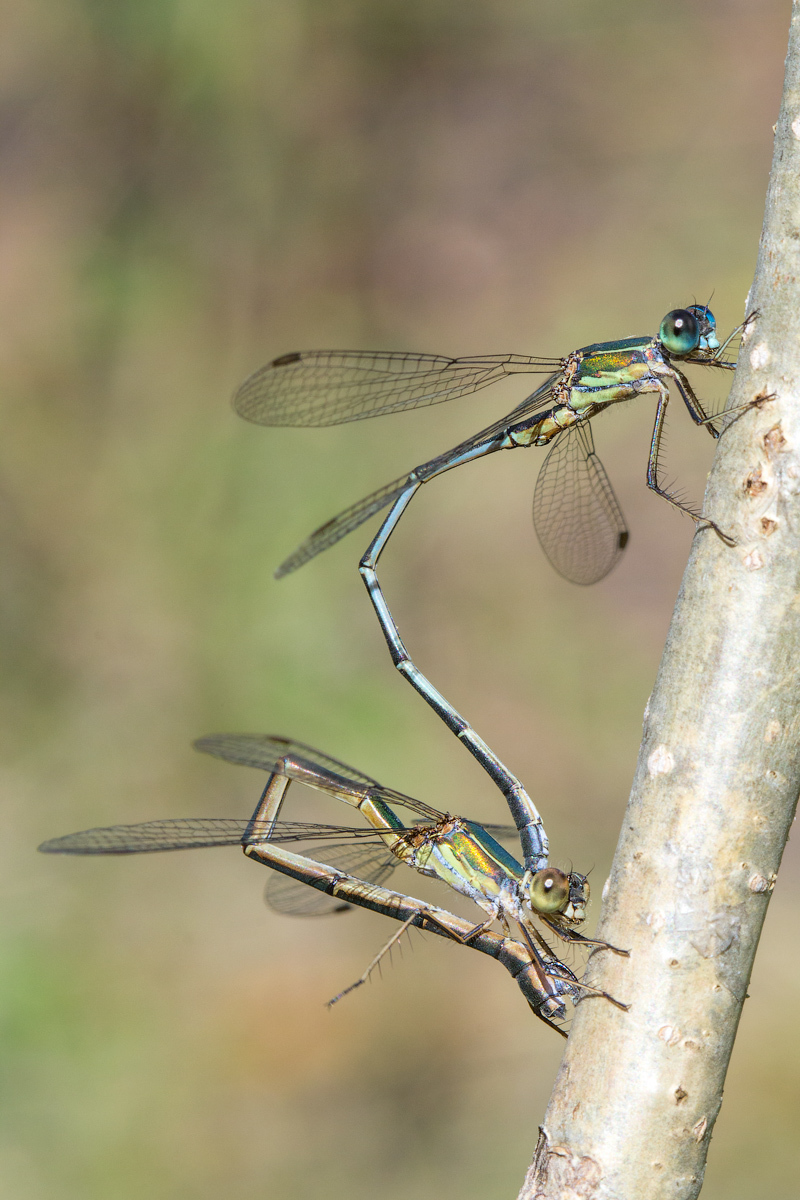
Chalcolestes parvidens

Five species of Lestidae in three genera have been recorded in Israel:

Genus	Species	Distribution in Israel
Lestes	Lestes barbarus	Common mainly in northern Israel (Golan Heights) south to Netanya line
Lestes	Lestes macrostigma	Extremely rare; no sightings for decades
Lestes	Lestes virens	Fairly common in northern and central Israel
Chalcolestes	Chalcolestes parvidens	Common, found from northern Israel to the central regions
Sympecma	Sympecma fusca	Uncommon; more frequent in the north than in central regions

=== Calopterygidae ===
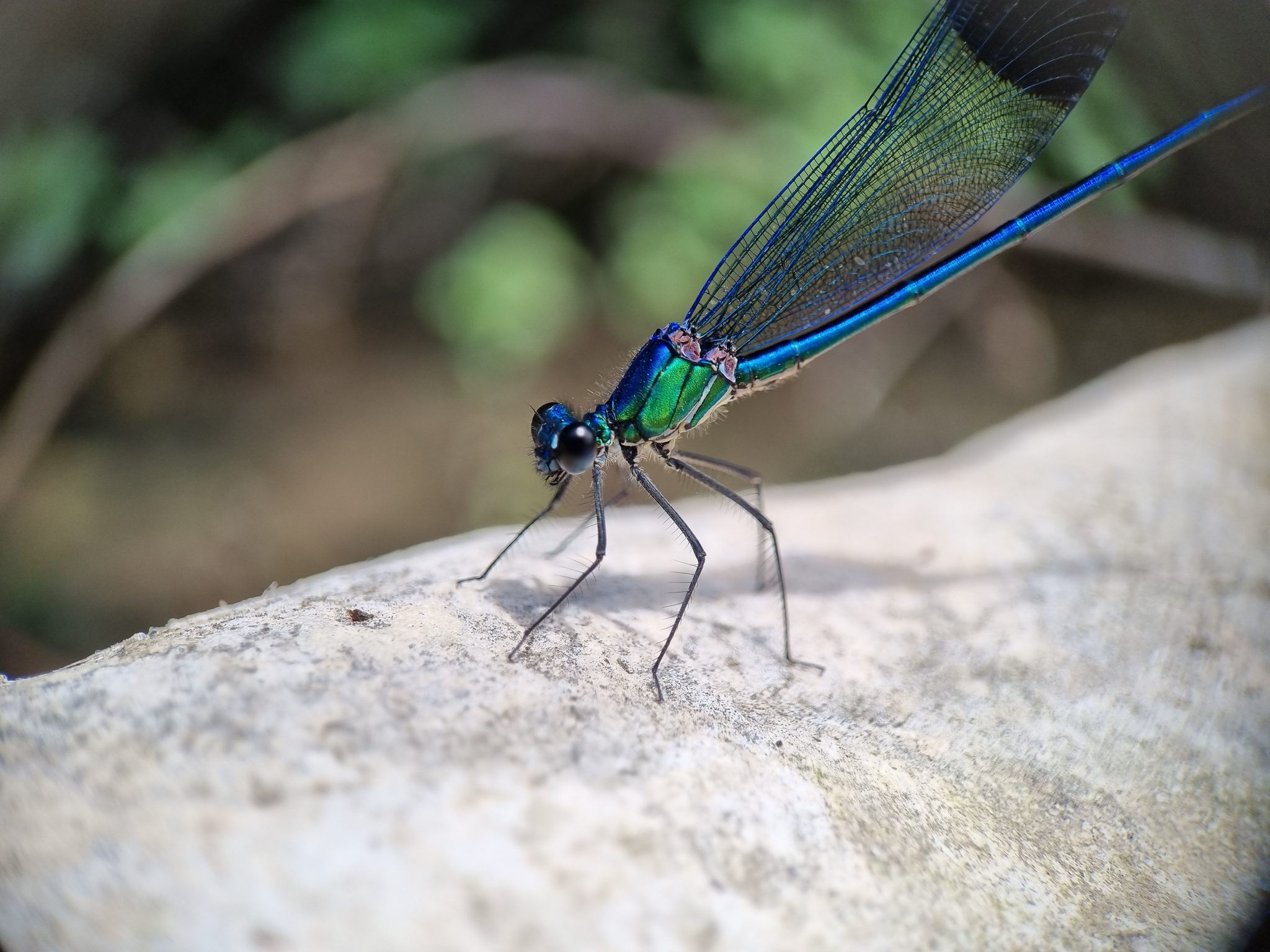
Calopteryx syriaca male, Nahal Kziv

Two species of Calopterygidae in one genus have been recorded:

Genus	Species	Distribution in Israel
Calopteryx	Calopteryx syriaca	Very common in suitable habitats in rivers and streams in northern Israel, reaching south to Nahal Taninim
Calopteryx	Calopteryx hyalina	Formerly recorded in the Hula Valley; not observed for decades and likely extirpated following the drainage of Hula Lake

=== Euphaeidae ===
One species of Euphaeidae:

Genus	Species	Distribution in Israel
Epallage	Epallage fatime	Common in suitable habitats across most of the country

=== Platycnemididae ===
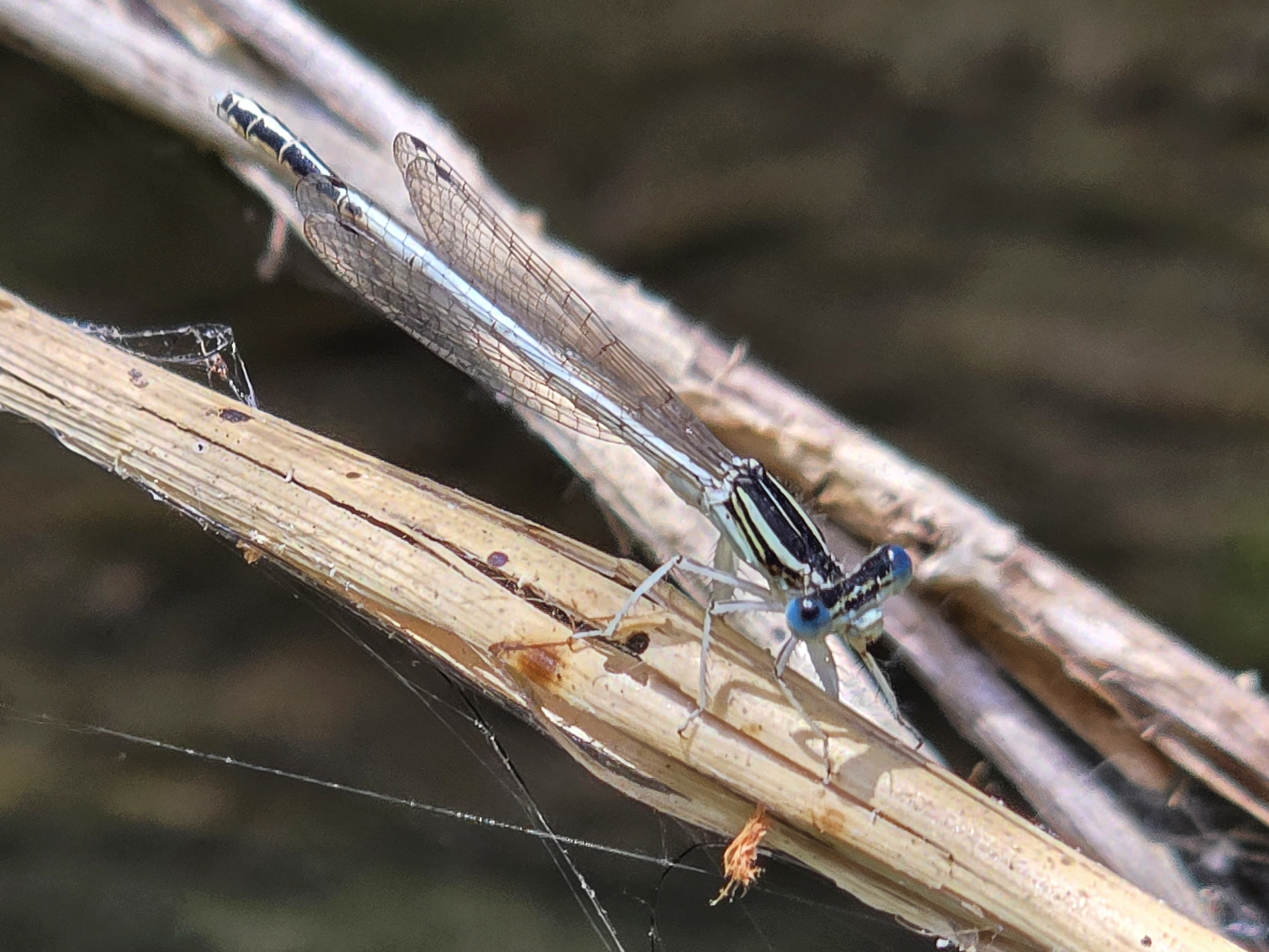
Platycnemis dealbata male, Hod HaSharon park

Two species of Platycnemididae in one genus:

Genus	Species	Distribution in Israel
Platycnemis	Platycnemis dealbata	Very common in northern and central Israel
Platycnemis	Platycnemis kervillei	Small, localized population in the Hula Valley

=== Coenagrionidae ===
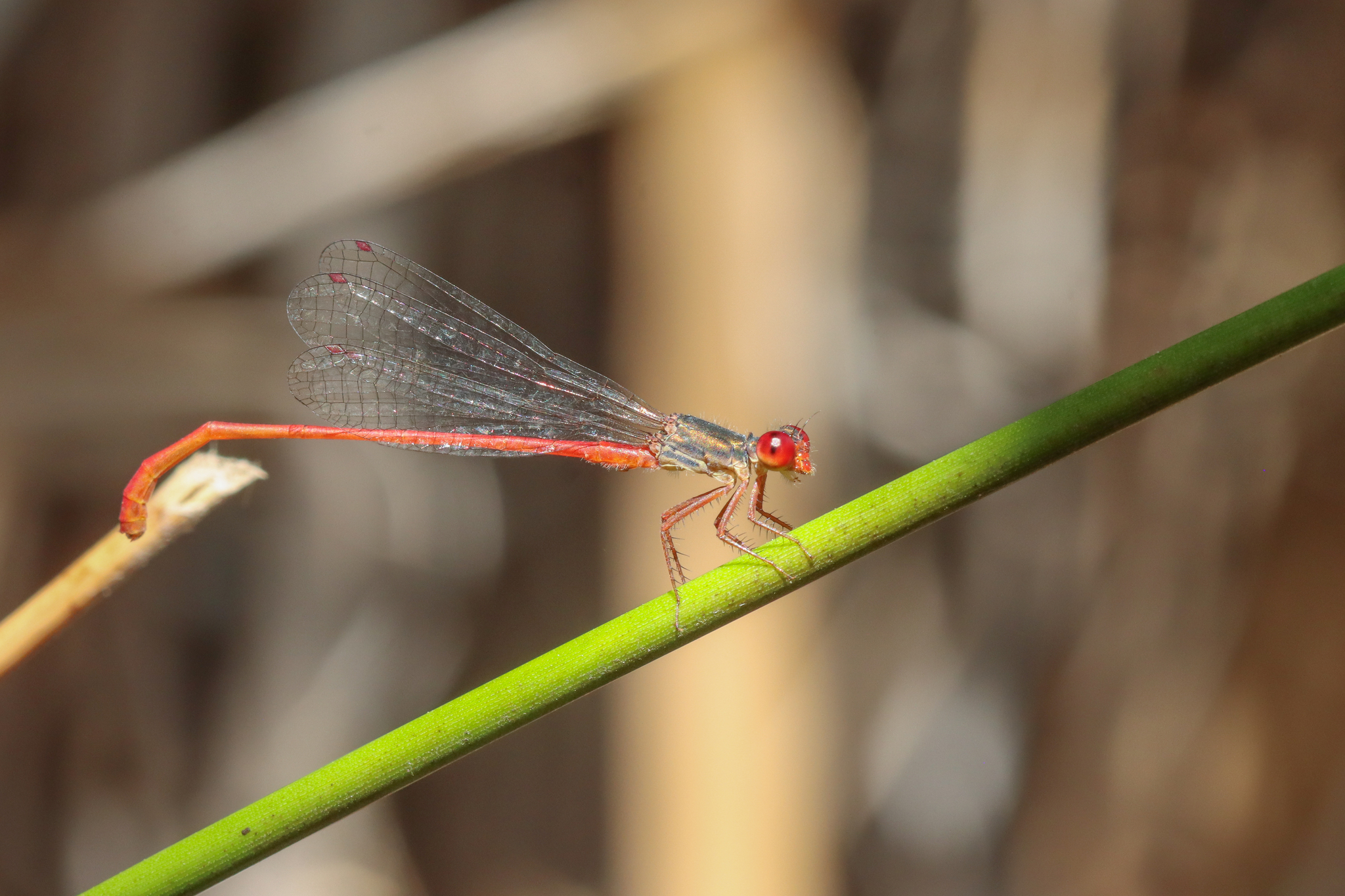
Ceriagrion georgifreyi male, Einot Tzukim

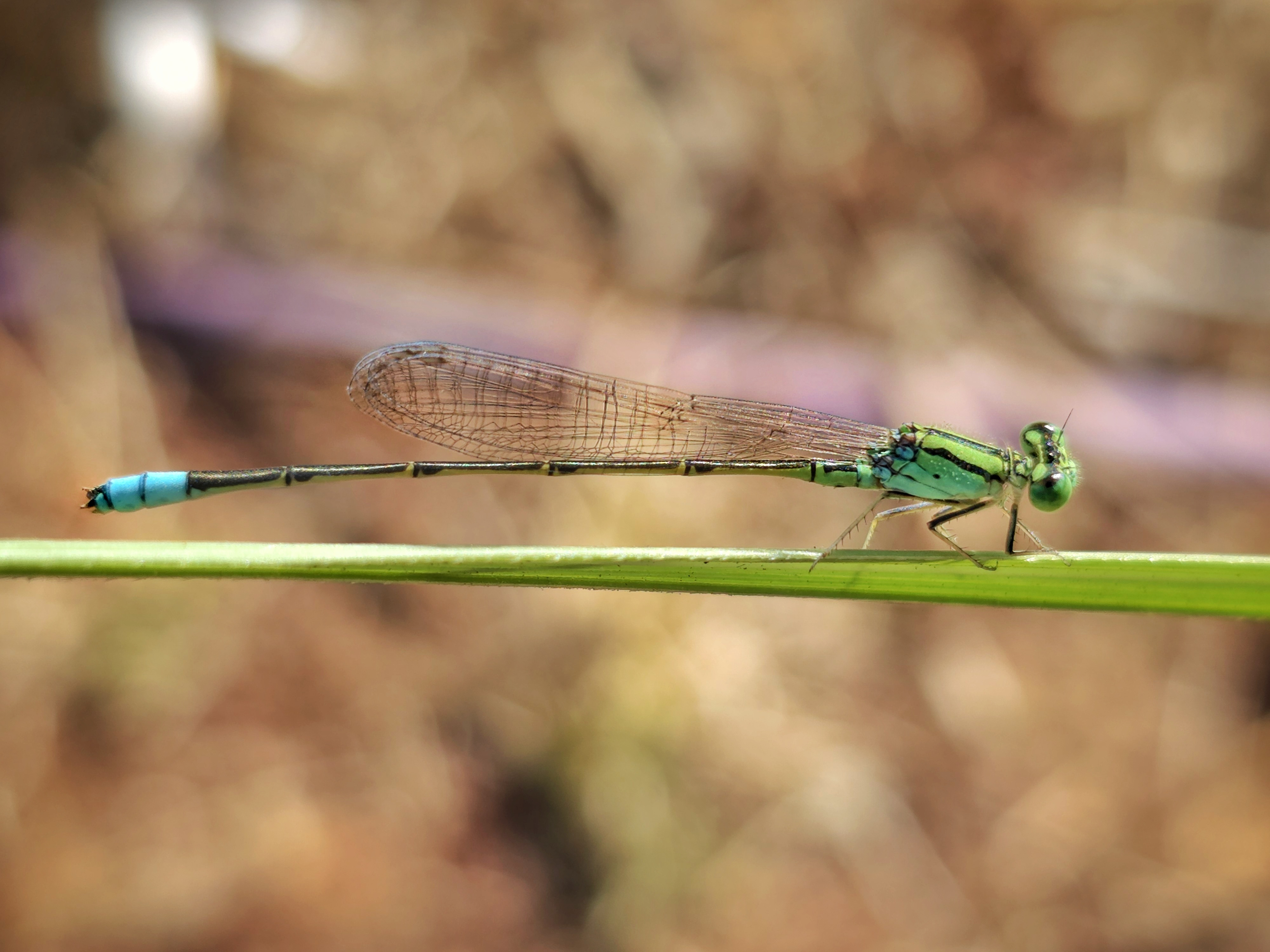
Pseudagrion torridum hulae male, Hod HaSharon park

Fourteen species of Coenagrionidae in six genera have been recorded:

Genus	Species	Distribution in Israel
Agriocnemis	Agriocnemis sania	Uncommon; mainly in the Golan Heights and northern valleys
Ceriagrion	Ceriagrion georgifreyi	Regularly observed in several sites in the Hula Valley, coastal plain, and Einot Tzukim
Coenagrion	Coenagrion scitulum	Uncommon; mainly in the Golan Heights and Upper Galilee
Coenagrion	Coenagrion syriacum	Common, especially in the Golan Heights and northern valleys
Erythromma	Erythromma lindenii	Uncommon; northern Israel
Erythromma	Erythromma viridulum	Common in northern and central Israel up to the Jerusalem area
Ischnura	Ischnura elegans	Very common in northern and central Israel; rarer in the south
Ischnura	Ischnura evansi	Common along the Syrian-African Rift Valley
Ischnura	Ischnura fountaineae	Locally common in freshwater habitats around the Dead Sea and south along the Arabah
Ischnura	Ischnura pumilio	Rare; mainly in the Golan Heights, Upper Galilee, and Hula Valley
Ischnura	Ischnura senegalensis	Common throughout Israel, especially in the south and along the Jordan Rift Valley
Pseudagrion	Pseudagrion sublacteum	Common in the north and along the Jordan Rift Valley
Pseudagrion	Pseudagrion syriacum	Very common in northern Israel and along the Rift to the Dead Sea
Pseudagrion	Pseudagrion torridum	Common in northern valleys and along the coastal plain; local subspecies named P. t. hulae

== Dragonflies (Anisoptera) ==
=== Aeshnidae ===
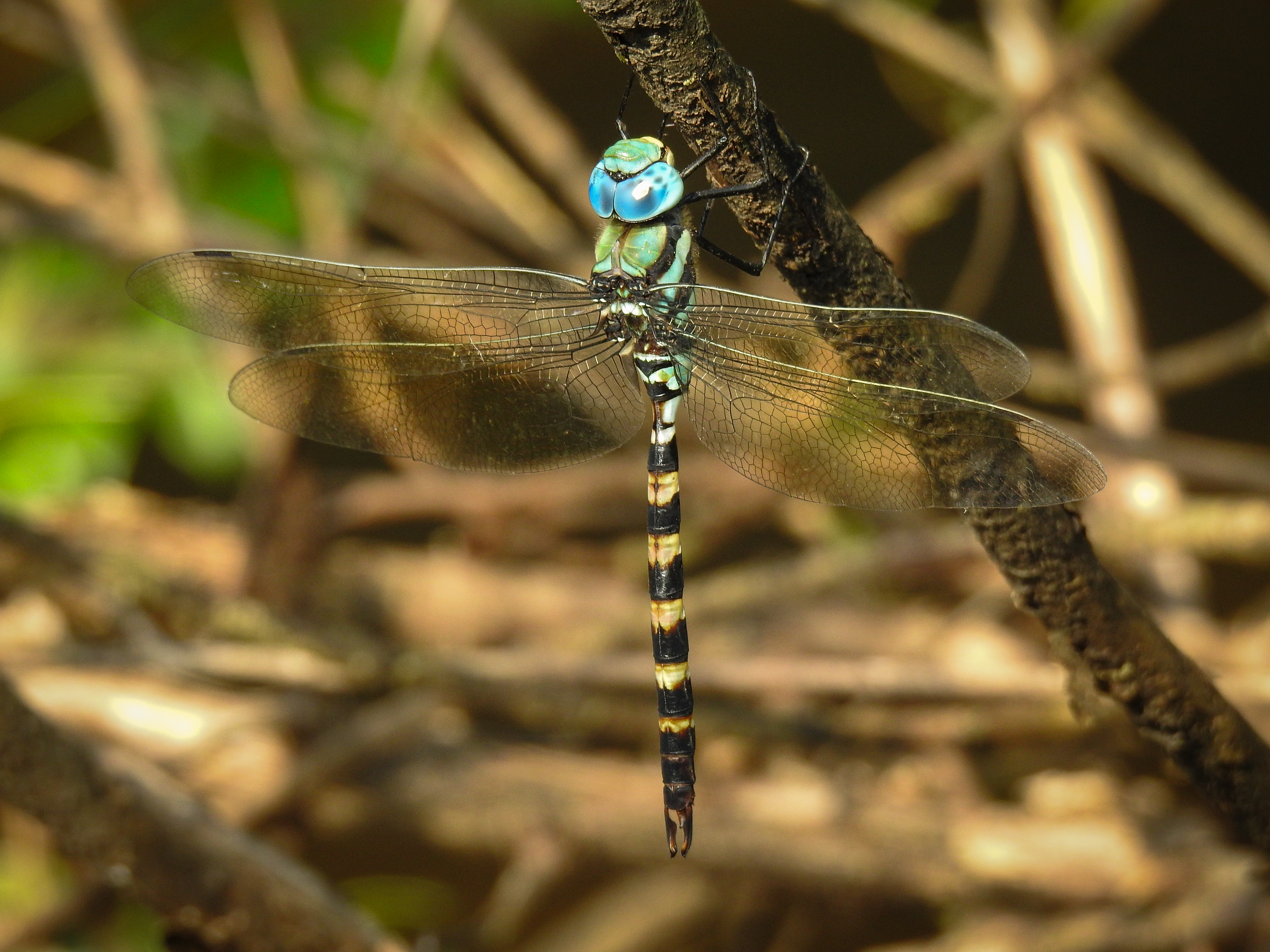
Anax immaculifrons

Seven species of Aeshnidae in three genera:

Genus	Species	Distribution in Israel
Aeshna	Aeshna mixta	Uncommon; mainly Upper Galilee
Aeshna	Aeshna isoceles	Uncommon; mainly northern Israel
Anax	Anax ephippiger	Common migrant, also observed in arid regions
Anax	Anax immaculifrons	Rare; northern Israel
Anax	Anax imperator	Common throughout Israel
Anax	Anax parthenope	Common in most parts of the country
Caliaeschna	Caliaeschna microstigma	Found in northern Israel

=== Gomphidae ===
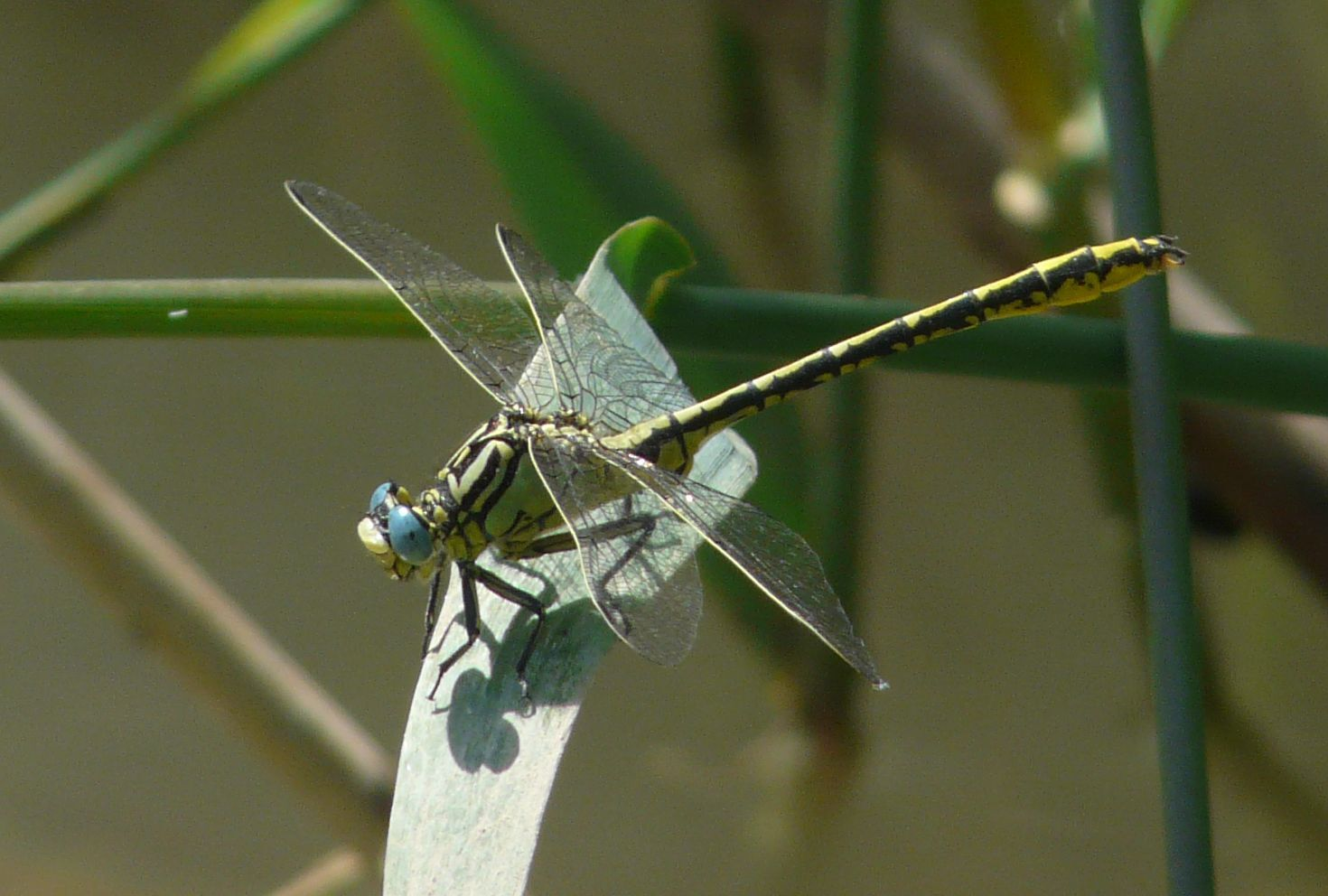
Gomphus davidi

Seven species of Gomphidae in four genera:

Genus	Species	Distribution in Israel
Gomphus	Gomphus davidi	Common in northern Israel and valleys
Lindenia	Lindenia tetraphylla	Formerly observed in the Jordan and Hula valleys; recently only a single observation
Onychogomphus	Onychogomphus flexuosus	Extremely rare; not observed for decades
Onychogomphus	Onychogomphus lefebvrii	Most common species of the genus; found in northern and eastern Israel south to Wadi Qelt
Onychogomphus	Onychogomphus macrodon	Rare; recorded in the Hula Valley and Jordan Valley
Paragomphus	Paragomphus genei	Common mainly along the Jordan Rift Valley from north to southern Dead Sea
Paragomphus	Paragomphus sinaiticus	Recently recorded species; small population found near Neot Smadar

=== Libellulidae ===
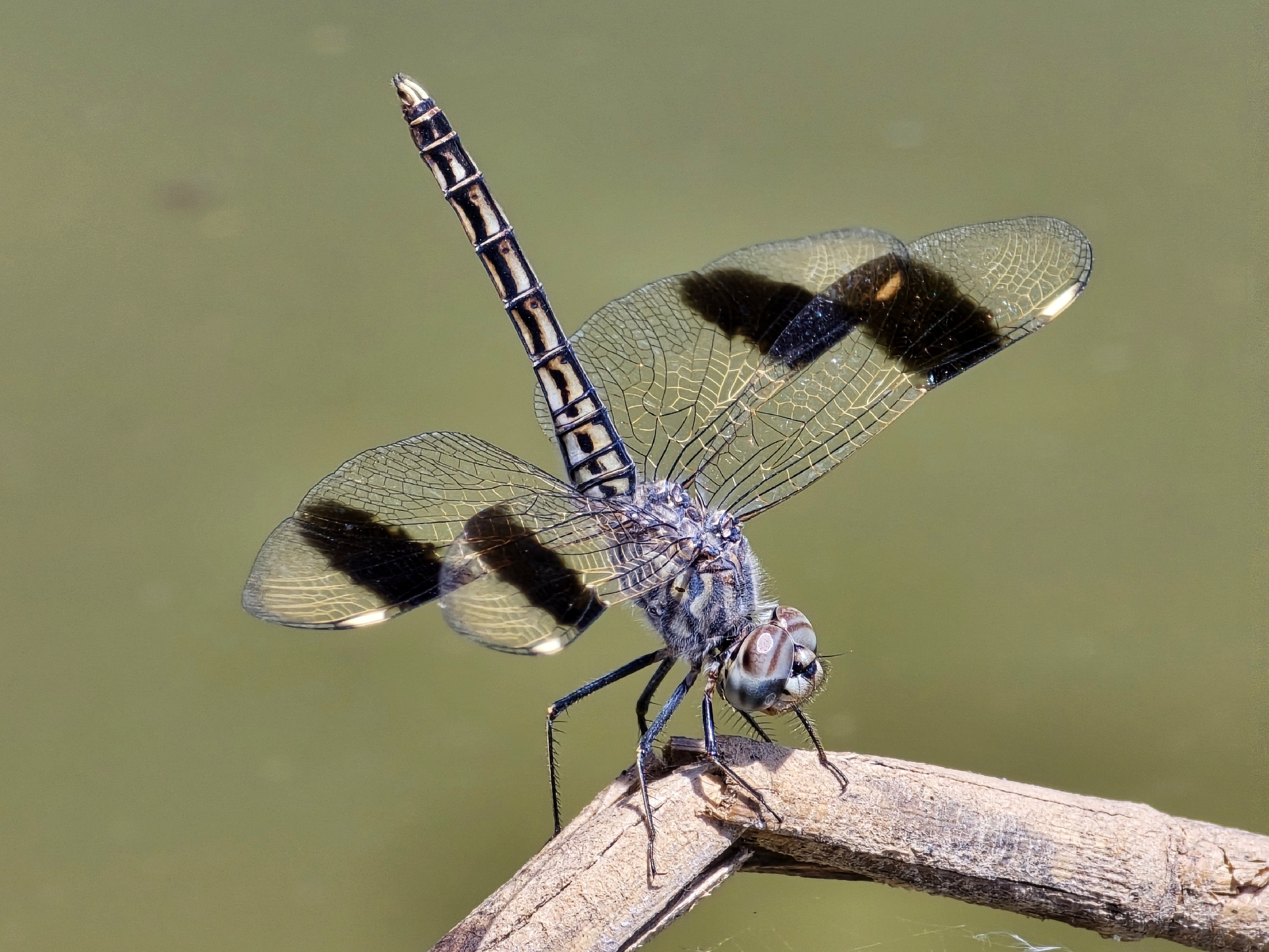
Brachythemis impartita immature male, Dan, Israel

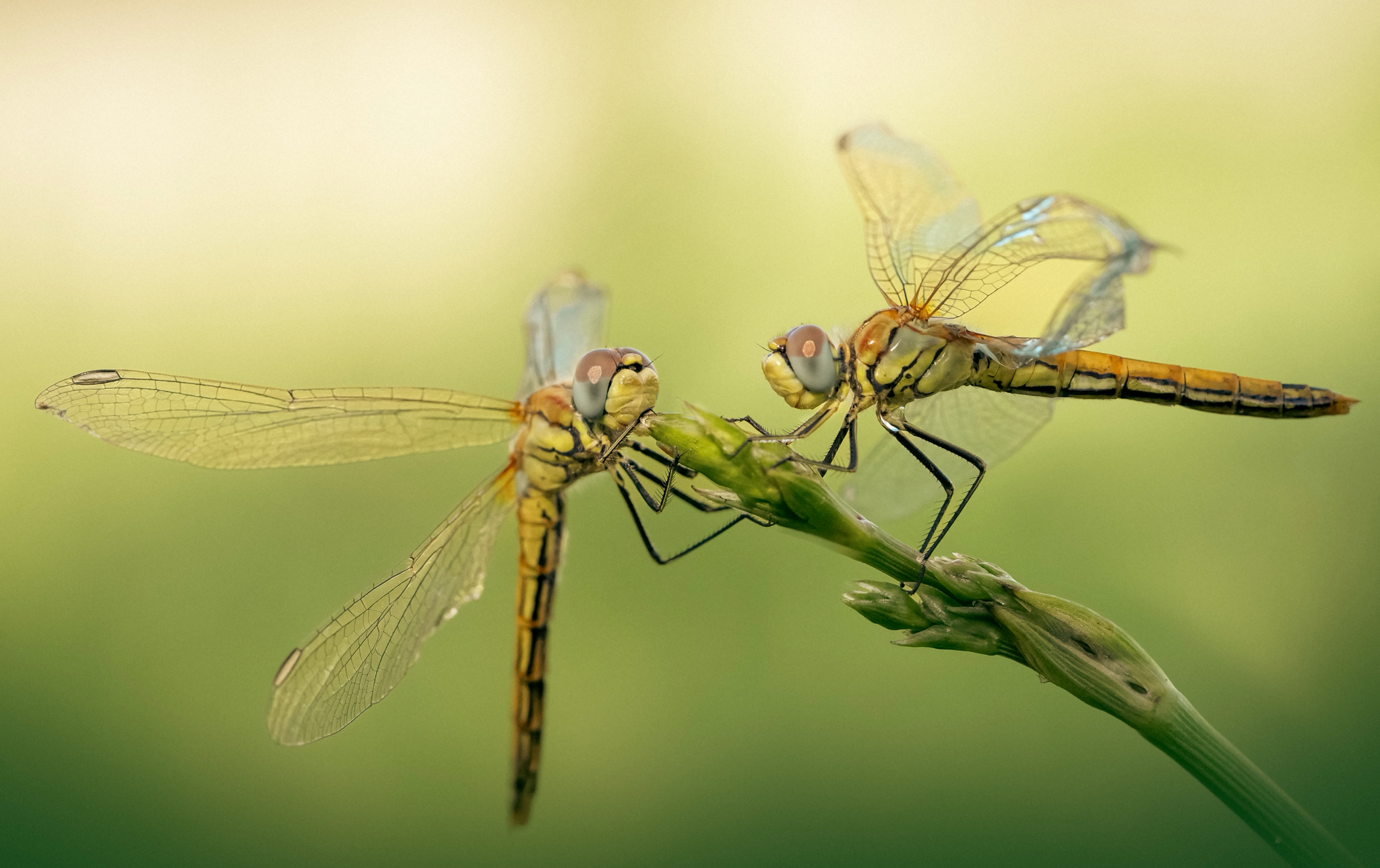
Sympetrum fonscolombii teneral, Netanya winter pond park

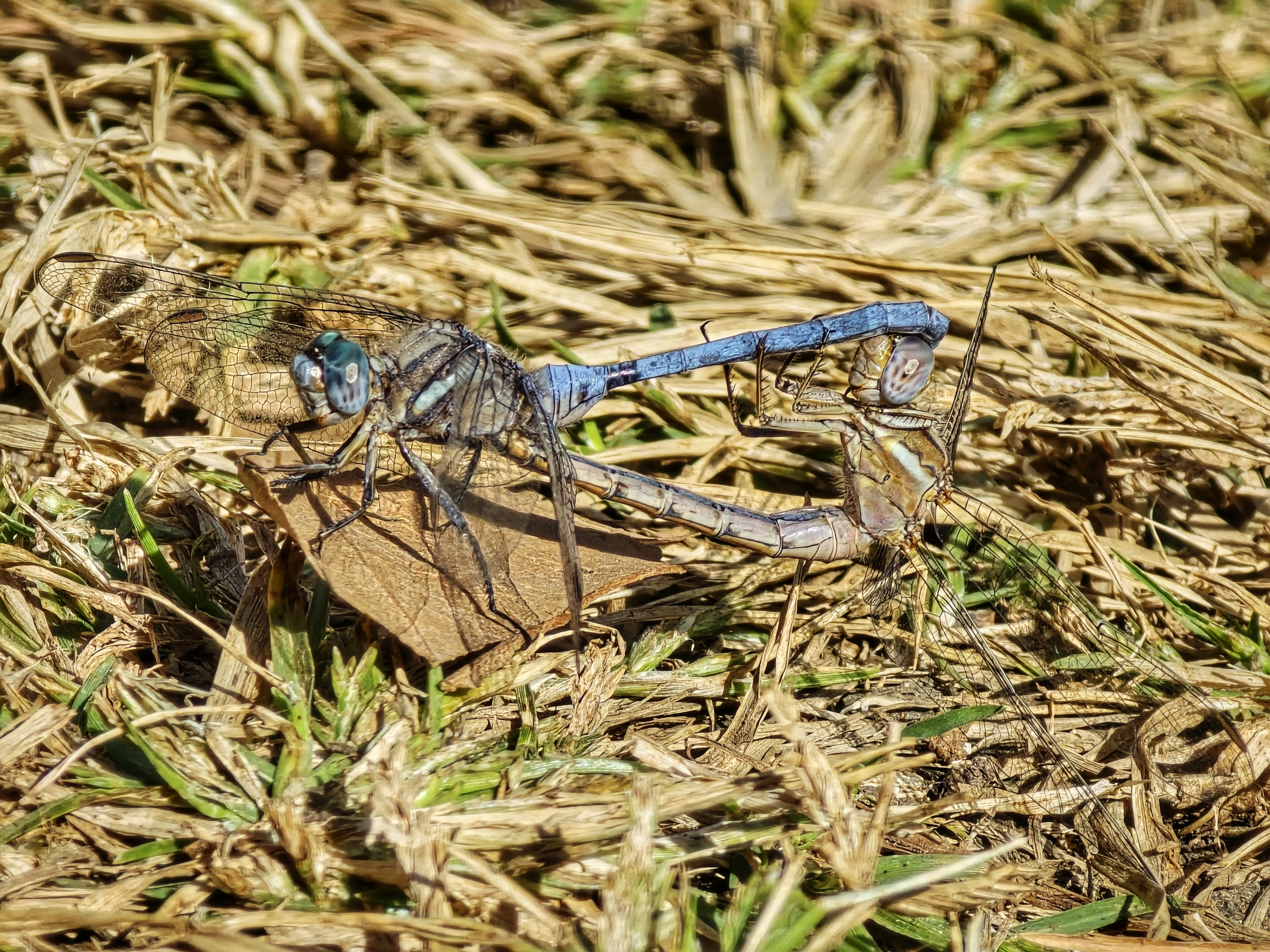
Orthetrum chrysostigma mating wheel, Ein Hemed

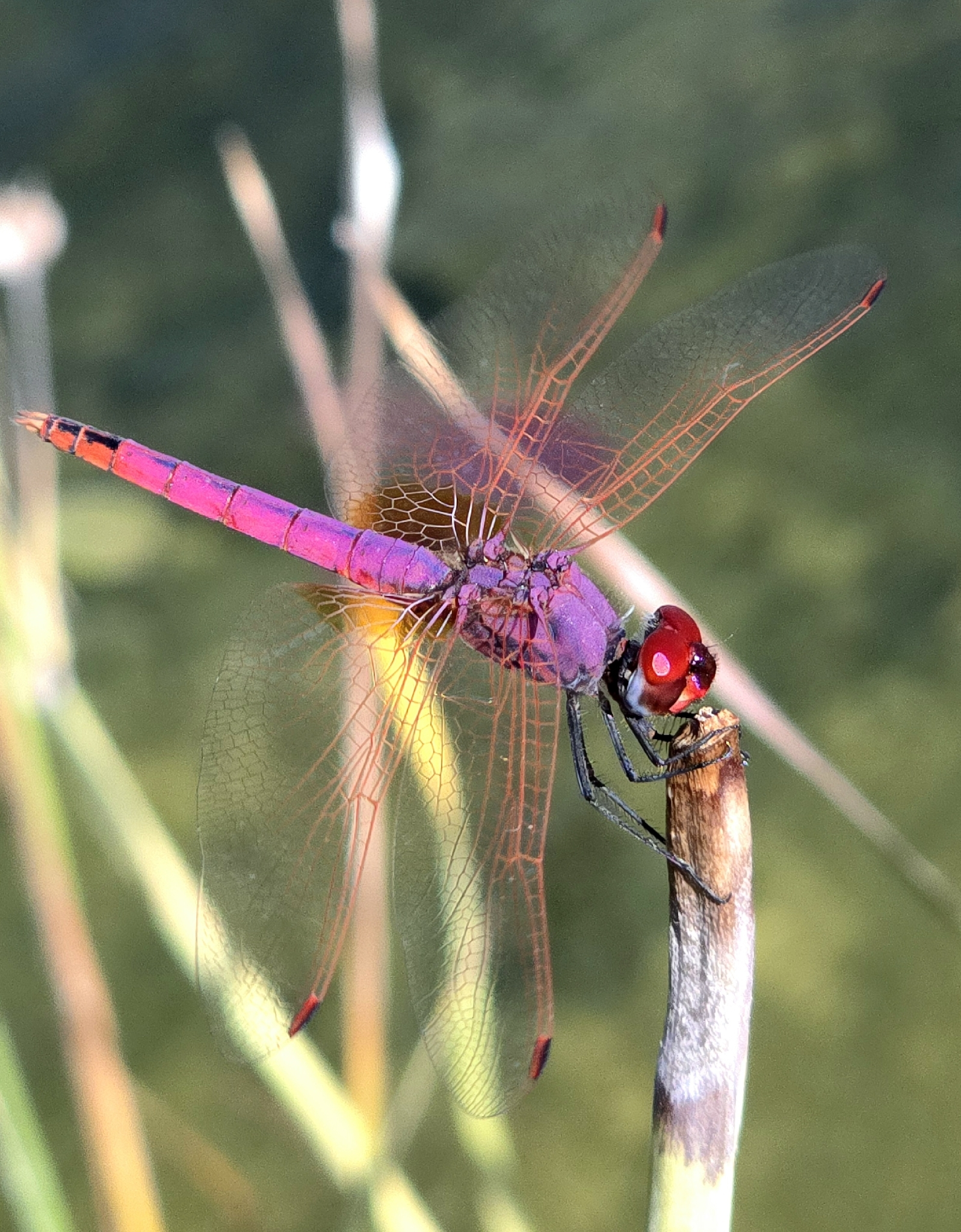
Trithemis annulata male, Shoham

Twenty-nine species of Libellulidae in twelve genera:

Genus	Species	Distribution in Israel
Brachythemis	Brachythemis fuscopalliata	Extirpated following the drainage of Hula Lake
Brachythemis	Brachythemis impartita	Very common in northern and central Israel and along the Rift Valley to Eilat
Crocothemis	Crocothemis erythraea	Very common across most of Israel
Crocothemis	Crocothemis sanguinolenta	Highly localized, mainly restricted to Nahal David
Crocothemis	Crocothemis servilia	Uncommon; mainly eastern Israel
Diplacodes	Diplacodes lefebvrii	Common throughout most of the country
Libellula	Libellula depressa	Formerly recorded in northern Israel; not observed in recent years
Libellula	Libellula pontica	Found in the Golan Heights and Hula Valley
Orthetrum	Orthetrum brunneum	Common from northern Israel to approximately Beersheba
Orthetrum	Orthetrum cancellatum	Recently recorded; population discovered in the Golan Heights in 2018
Orthetrum	Orthetrum chrysostigma	Very common across most of Israel
Orthetrum	Orthetrum coerulescens	Common throughout the country
Orthetrum	Orthetrum ransonnetii	Common in southern Israel, especially around Eilat
Orthetrum	Orthetrum sabina	Fairly common in northern and central Israel; also along the Rift Valley
Orthetrum	Orthetrum taeniolatum	Rare; recorded in The West Bank and the Golan Heights
Orthetrum	Orthetrum trinacria	Fairly common in northern and central Israel
Pantala	Pantala flavescens	Common migrant between August and November
Rhyothemis	Rhyothemis semihyalina	Formerly common in the Hula Valley; extirpated following drainage
Selysiothemis	Selysiothemis nigra	Increasingly observed across much of Israel in recent years
Sympetrum	Sympetrum fonscolombii	Fairly common across most of Israel
Sympetrum	Sympetrum meridionale	Common in northern and central Israel
Sympetrum	Sympetrum sanguineum	Very rare; not recorded for decades
Sympetrum	Sympetrum sinaiticum	Rediscovered in 2020 in southern Israel
Sympetrum	Sympetrum striolatum	Common mainly in northern Israel
Trithemis	Trithemis annulata	Very common across most of Israel
Trithemis	Trithemis arteriosa	Very common, especially in eastern and southern regions
Trithemis	Trithemis festiva	Extremely rare
Urothemis	Urothemis edwardsii	Formerly common in the Hula Valley; extirpated following drainage
Zygonyx	Zygonyx torridus	Common mainly in eastern Israel; also observed along the coastal plain
