= Calopteryx hyalina =

Conservation status
- Endangered (IUCN 3.1)

Scientific classification
- Kingdom: Animalia
- Phylum: Arthropoda
- Class: Insecta
- Order: Odonata
- Suborder: Zygoptera
- Family: Calopterygidae
- Genus: Calopteryx
- Species: C. hyalina

Binomial name
- Calopteryx hyalina Martin, 1909

Species of damselfly

Calopteryx hyalina is a species of broad-winged damselfly in the family Calopterygidae.

The IUCN conservation status of Calopteryx hyalina is "EN", endangered. The species faces a high risk of extinction in the near future. The population is decreasing. The IUCN status was reviewed in 2010.
