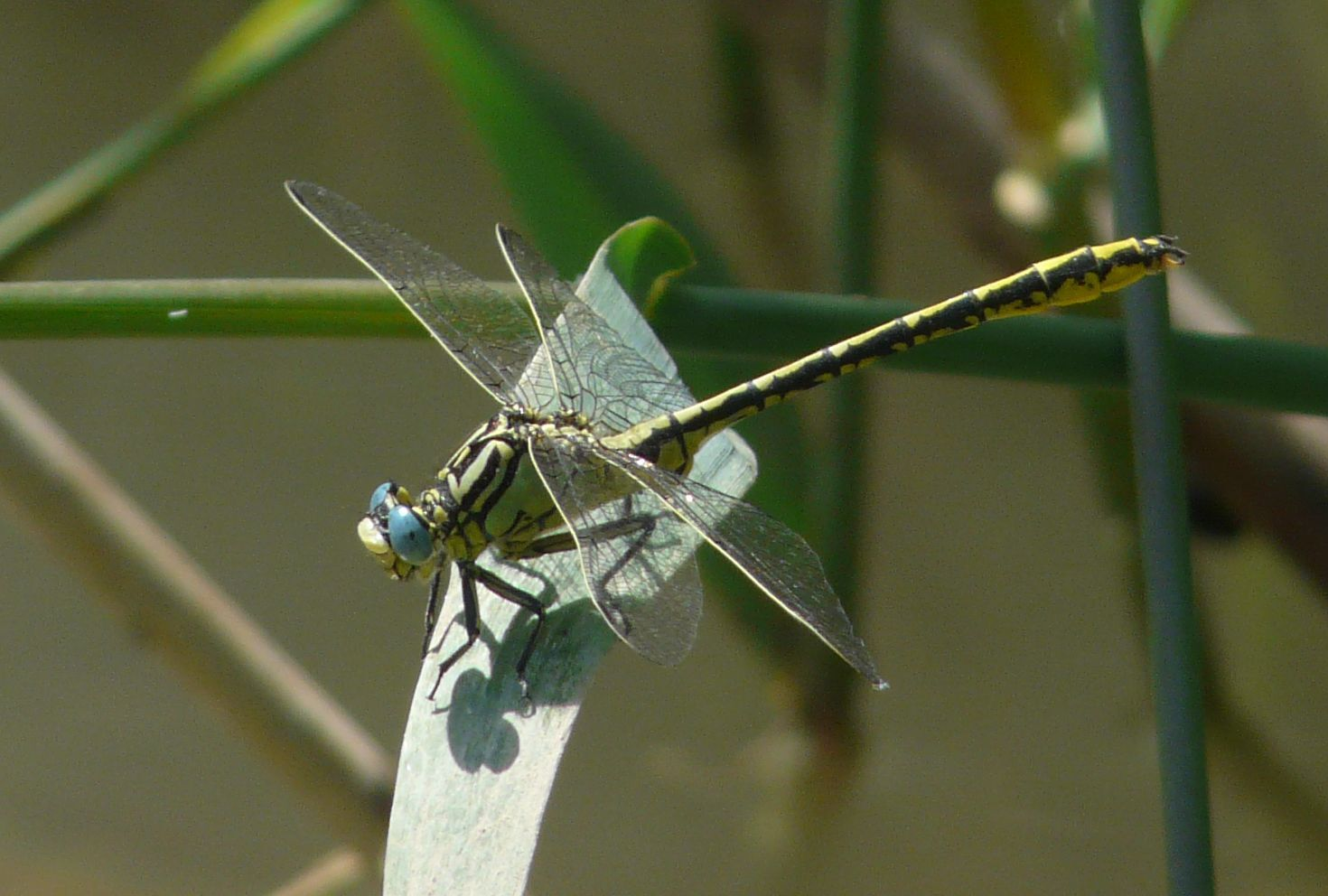
- Male in Turkey

Conservation status
- Least Concern (IUCN 3.1)

Scientific classification
- Kingdom: Animalia
- Phylum: Arthropoda
- Class: Insecta
- Order: Odonata
- Infraorder: Anisoptera
- Family: Gomphidae
- Genus: Gomphus
- Species: G. davidi

Binomial name
- Gomphus davidi Selys, 1887

= Gomphus davidi =

Species of dragonfly

Gomphus davidi is a species of dragonfly in the family Gomphidae. It is found in Israel, Jordan, Lebanon, Syria, and Turkey. Its natural habitats are swamps, freshwater marshes, ponds, and canals and ditches. It is threatened by habitat loss.
