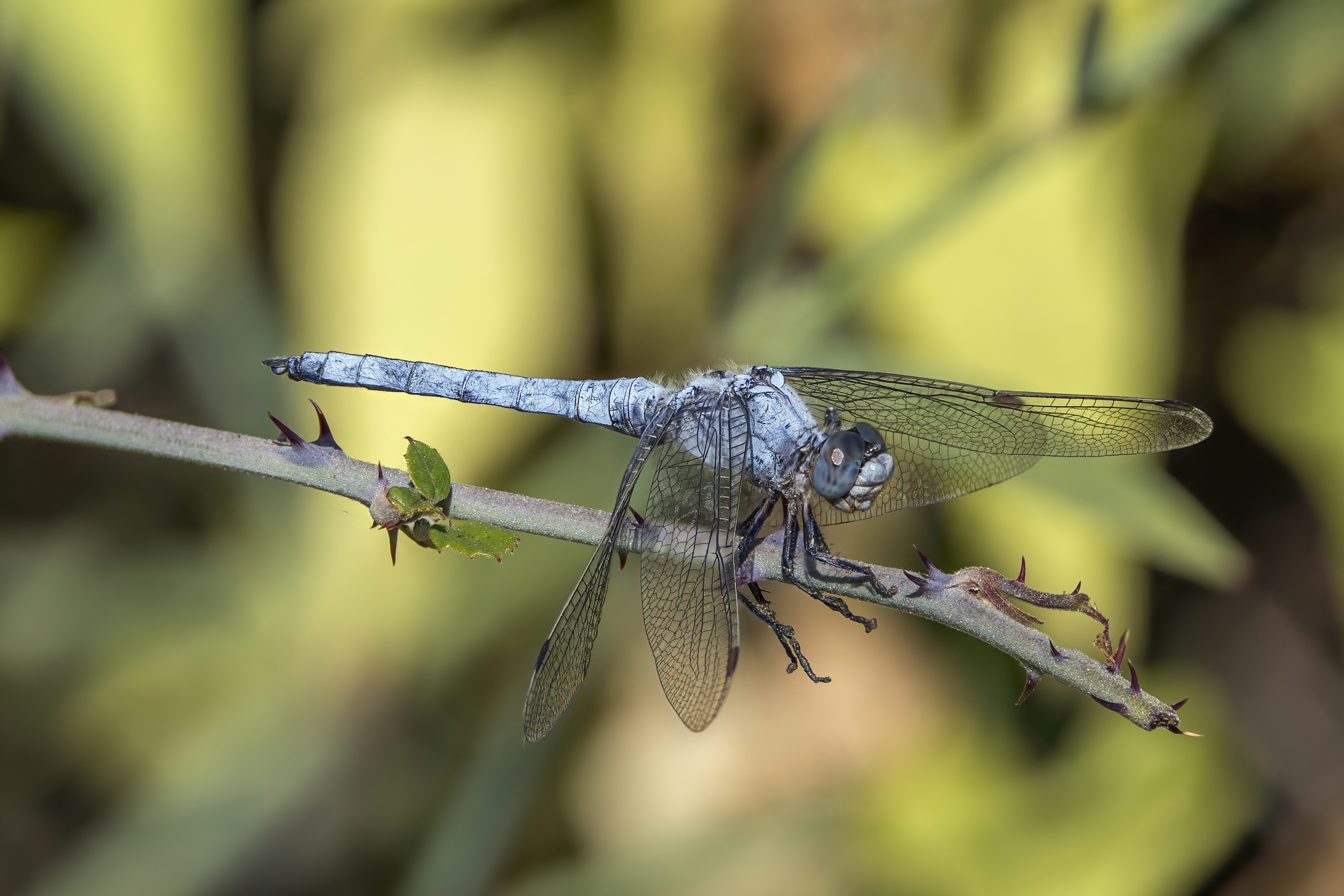
- Male, Cyprus
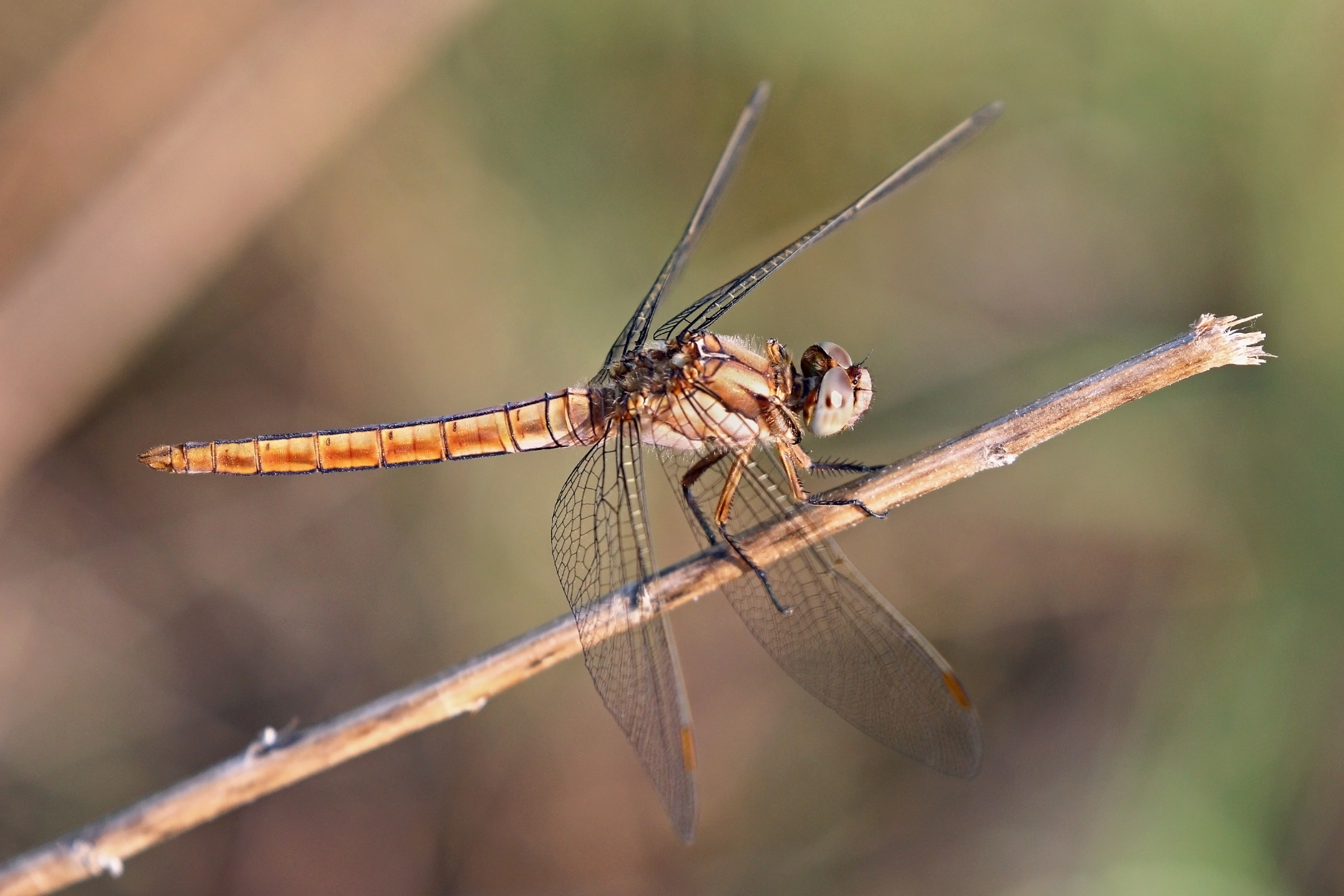
- Female, Bulgaria

Scientific classification
- Kingdom: Animalia
- Phylum: Arthropoda
- Clade: Pancrustacea
- Class: Insecta
- Order: Odonata
- Infraorder: Anisoptera
- Family: Libellulidae
- Genus: Orthetrum
- Species: O. brunneum

Binomial name
- Orthetrum brunneum (Fonscolombe, 1837)

Synonyms
- Libellula brunnea Fonscolombe, 1837

= Orthetrum brunneum =

Species of dragonfly

Orthetrum brunneum, the southern skimmer, is a species of 'skimmers' belonging to the family Libellulidae.

== Subspecies ==
Subspecies include:

- Orthetrum brunneum var. brunneum (Fonscolombe, 1837) (Palearctic realm)
- Orthetrum brunneum var. cycnos (Sélys, 1848) (Corsica and Sardinia)

== Distribution ==
This 'skimmer' is present in most of Europe and the range extends to Mongolia and North Africa.

It occurs in Afghanistan, Albania, Algeria, Andorra, Armenia, Austria, Belarus, Belgium, Bosnia and Herzegovina, Bulgaria, China, Croatia, Cyprus, Czech Republic, Egypt, France, Germany, Greece, Hungary, Italy, Latvia, Liechtenstein, Lithuania, Luxembourg, Republic of Macedonia, Malta, Moldova, Montenegro, Netherlands, Poland, Portugal, Romania, Russia, Serbia; Slovakia, Slovenia, Spain, Switzerland, Turkey, and Ukraine.

== Habitat ==
This species mainly prefers small streams, canals and ditches, with shallow, fast warming water.

== Description ==
The adults grow up to 40–45 millimetres (1.6–1.8 in) long. Their dimensions on average are larger than in Orthetrum coerulescens.

The thorax and the abdomen are pale blue in males, yellowish-brown or greyish-brown in females. Young males are brownish. The abdomen is relatively flattened and shows a thin middorsal black line and distinct points on each segment. The wings are hyaline, with yellow or pale brown pterostigma. The wingspan reaches 66–70 millimetres (2.6–2.8 in).

== Biology and behavior ==
Adults can be encountered from mid June through late August in the immediate vicinity of quiet rivers or close to stagnant and shallow waters, lying on a well sunny ground. Sexually mature males defend a 'territory' on the waterfront by making short inspection flights, in order to chase away other males.

These skimmers commonly mate at rest, usually on the ground. Female lays the eggs on the surface of shallow water, touching it only with her abdomen while flying, sometimes accompanied by the male, that keeps other males at a distance.

The larvae are ferocious predators. They live buried in fine soil material (fine sand, silt, etc.), in unshaded places in shallow water. They overwinter and develop in two or three years.

== Gallery ==
in copula. Video clip

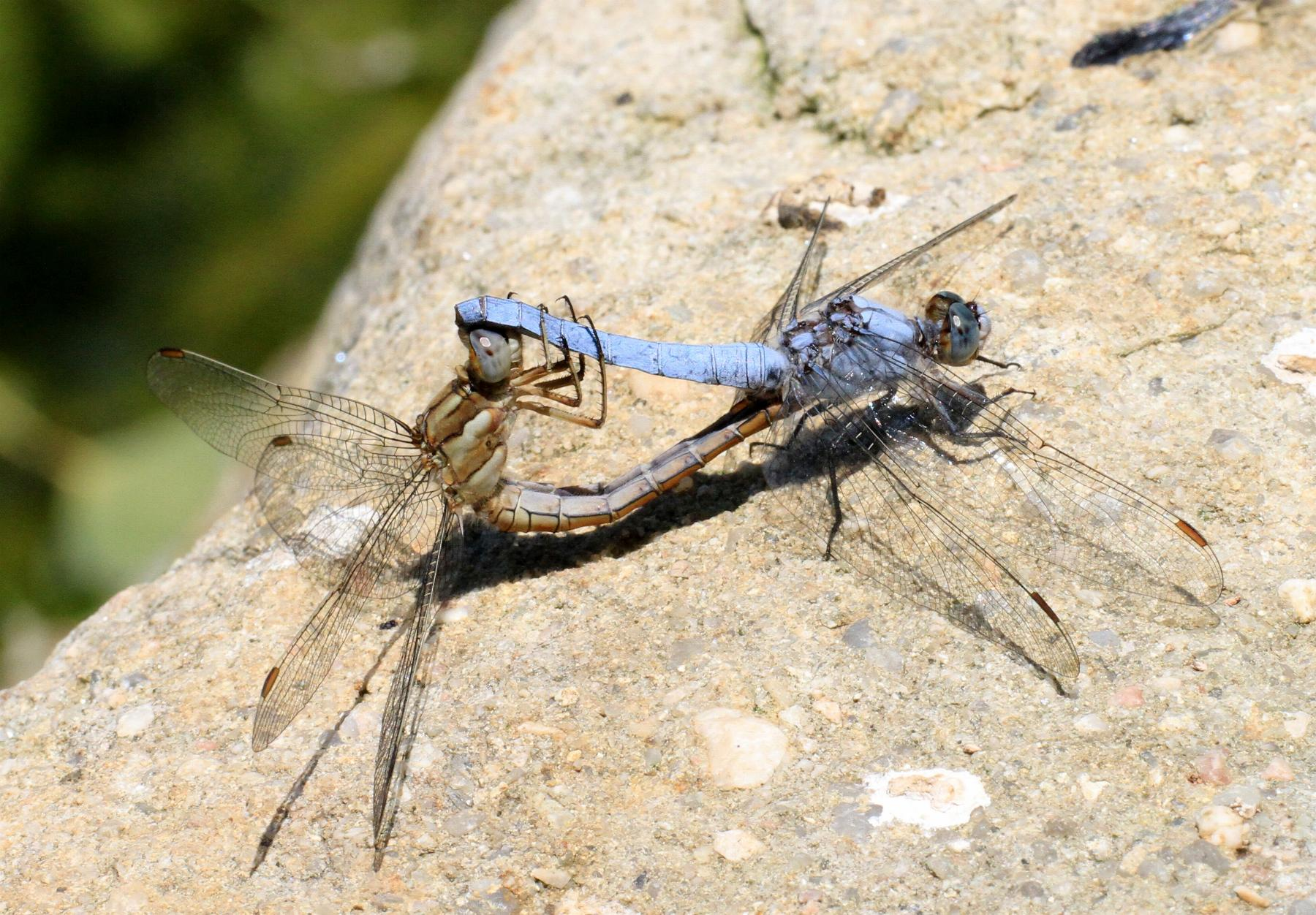
Mating

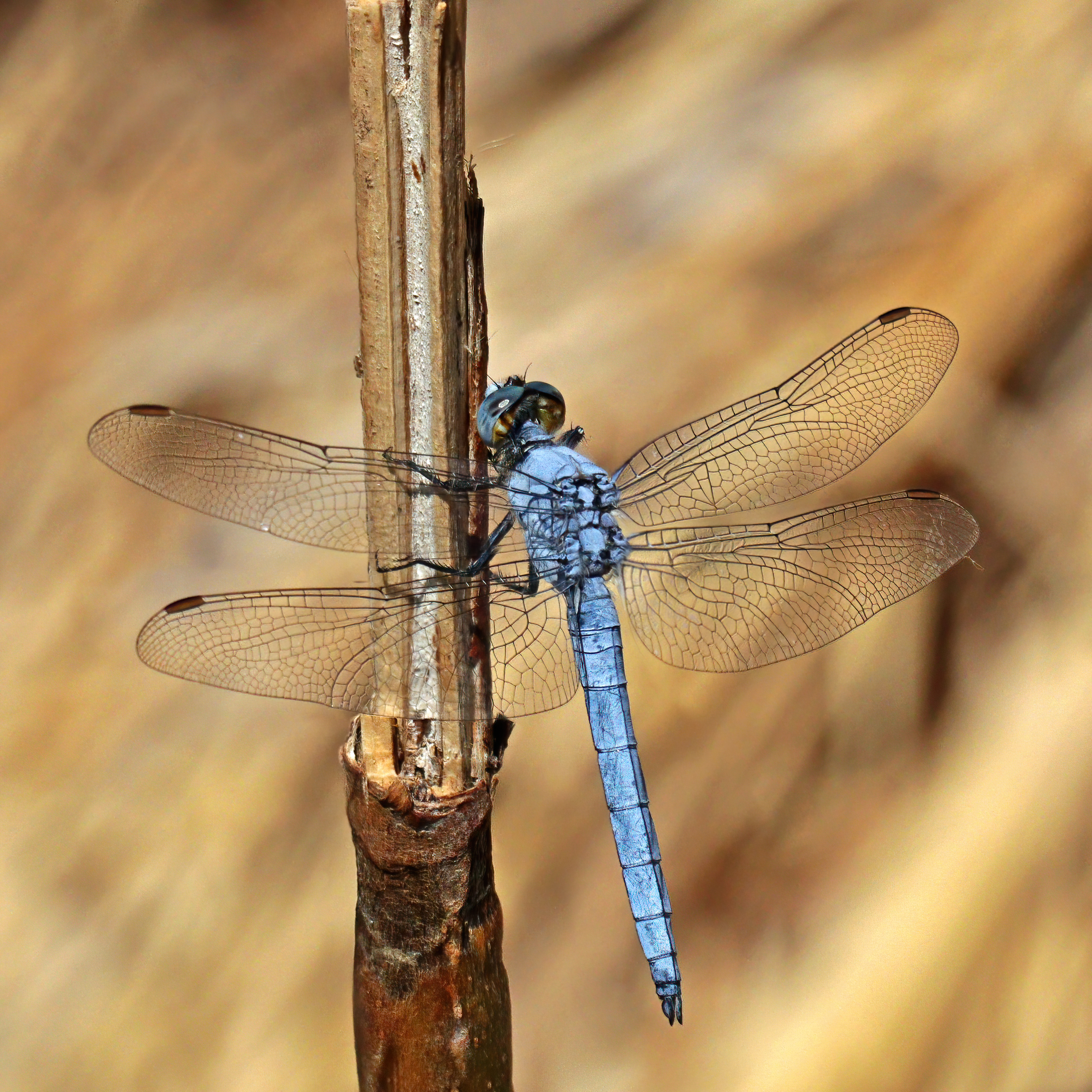
Male, dorsal view

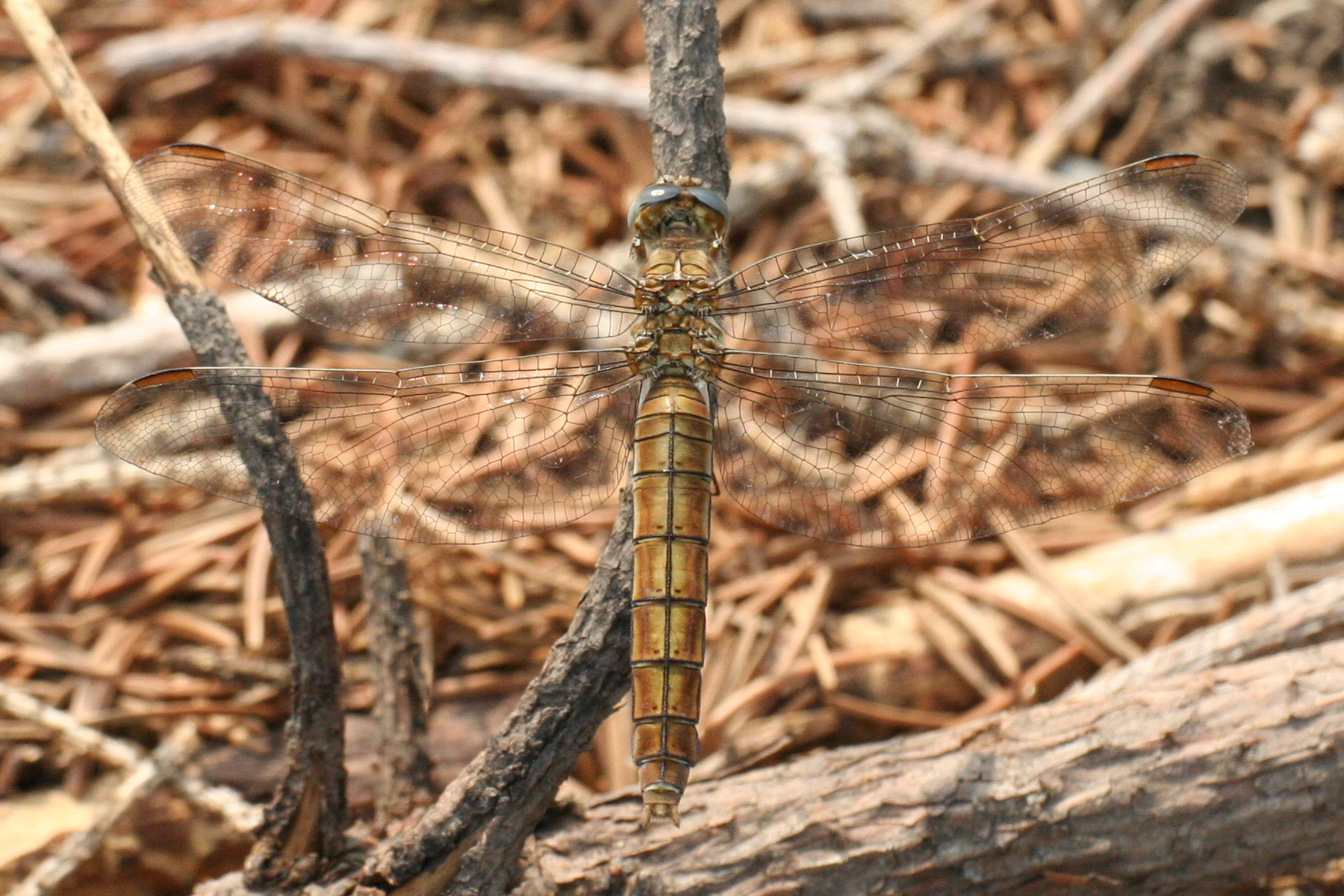
Female, dorsal view
