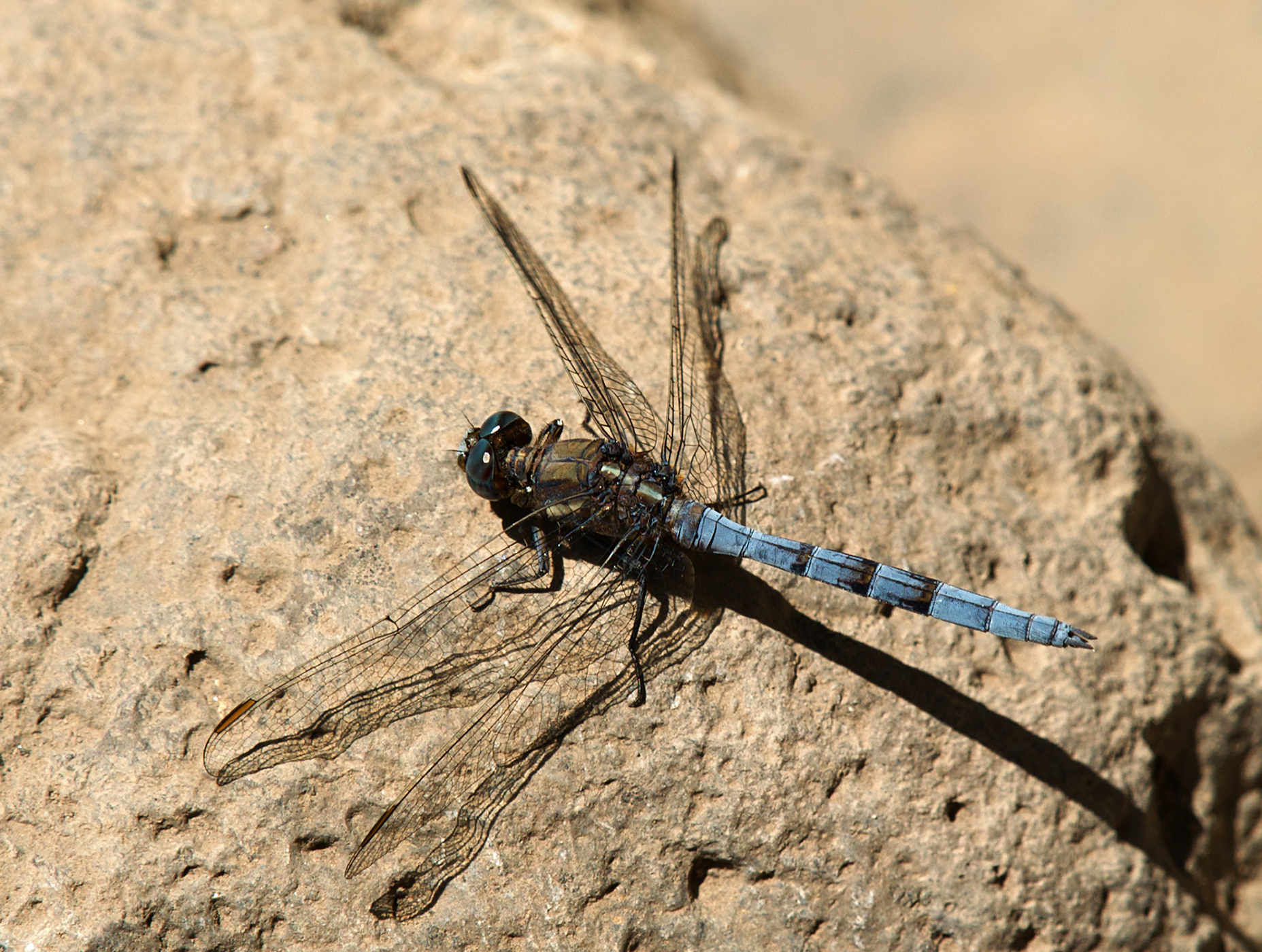
- Male
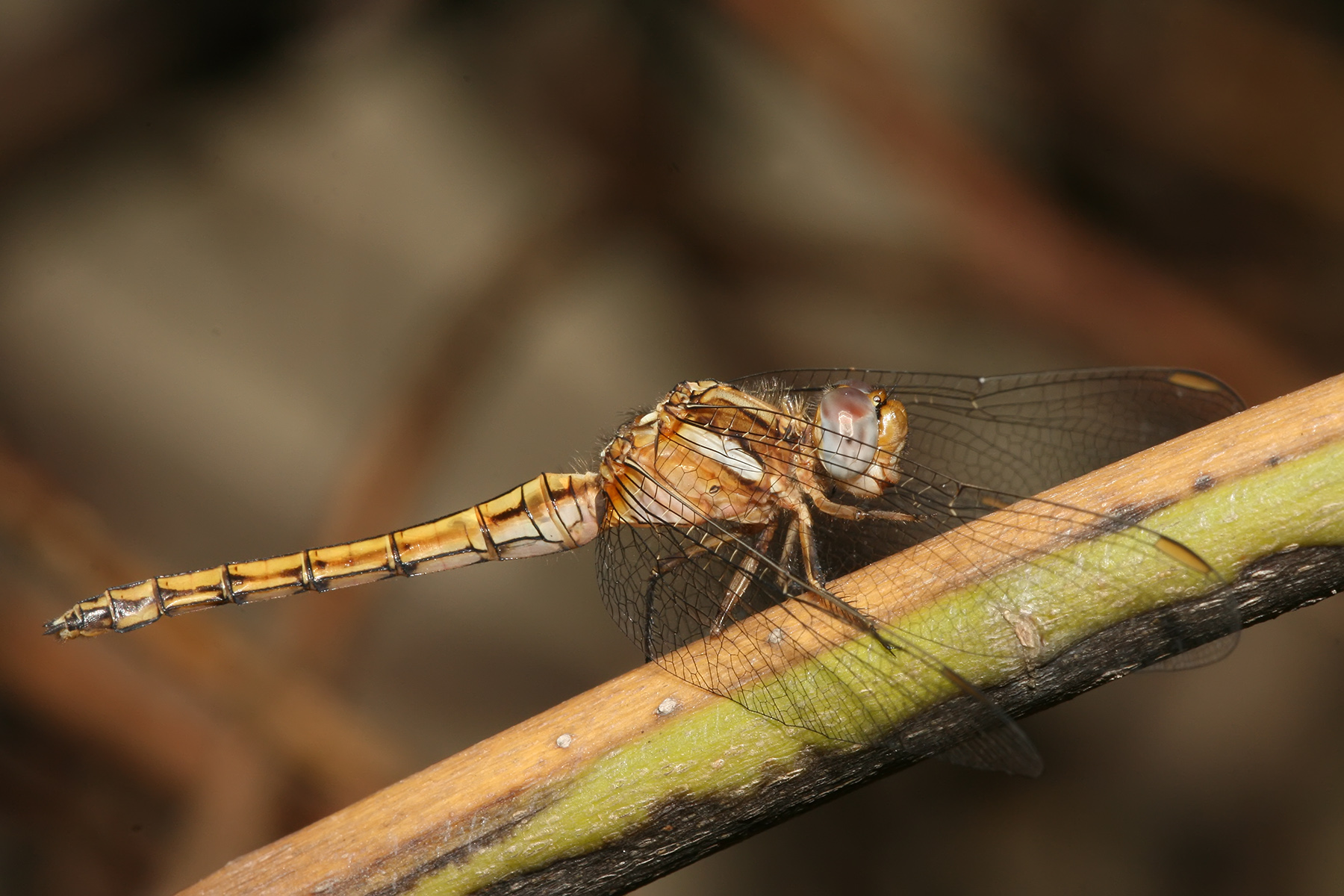
- Female

Conservation status
- Least Concern (IUCN 3.1)

Scientific classification
- Kingdom: Animalia
- Phylum: Arthropoda
- Clade: Pancrustacea
- Class: Insecta
- Order: Odonata
- Infraorder: Anisoptera
- Family: Libellulidae
- Genus: Orthetrum
- Species: O. chrysostigma

Binomial name
- Orthetrum chrysostigma (Burmeister, 1839)

= Orthetrum chrysostigma =

Species of dragonfly

Orthetrum chrysostigma, the epaulet skimmer, is a species of dragonfly in the family Libellulidae. It is found in Algeria, Angola, Benin, Botswana, Burkina Faso, Cameroon, Central African Republic, Chad, the Democratic Republic of the Congo, Ivory Coast, Egypt, Equatorial Guinea, Ethiopia, Gambia, Ghana, Guinea, Israel, Kenya, Liberia, Libya, Malawi, Mali, Mauritania, Morocco, Mozambique, Namibia, Niger, Nigeria, Senegal, Sierra Leone, Somalia, South Africa, Sudan, Tanzania, Togo, Uganda, Zambia, Zimbabwe, and possibly Burundi as well as Canary Islands, and Portugal. It was recorded in the Maltese Islands in 2010.

Its natural habitats are subtropical or tropical moist lowland forests, dry savanna, moist savanna, subtropical or tropical dry shrubland, subtropical or tropical moist shrubland, rivers, intermittent rivers, shrub-dominated wetlands, swamps, freshwater lakes, intermittent freshwater lakes, freshwater marshes, intermittent freshwater marshes, and freshwater springs. The adults prey on various flying insects. The bodies of adult males are blue, and those of young and females are yellow and brown.

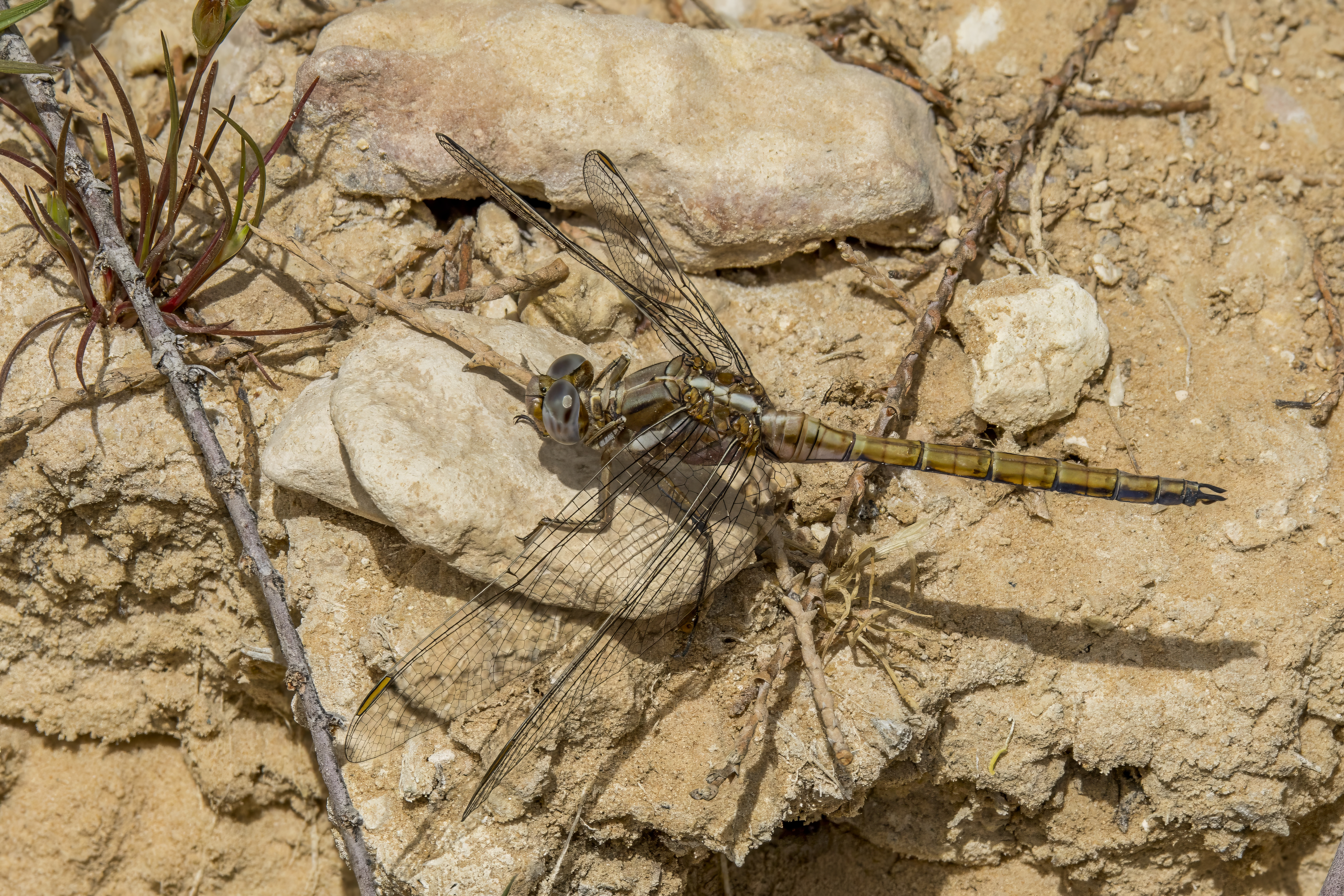
Immature male

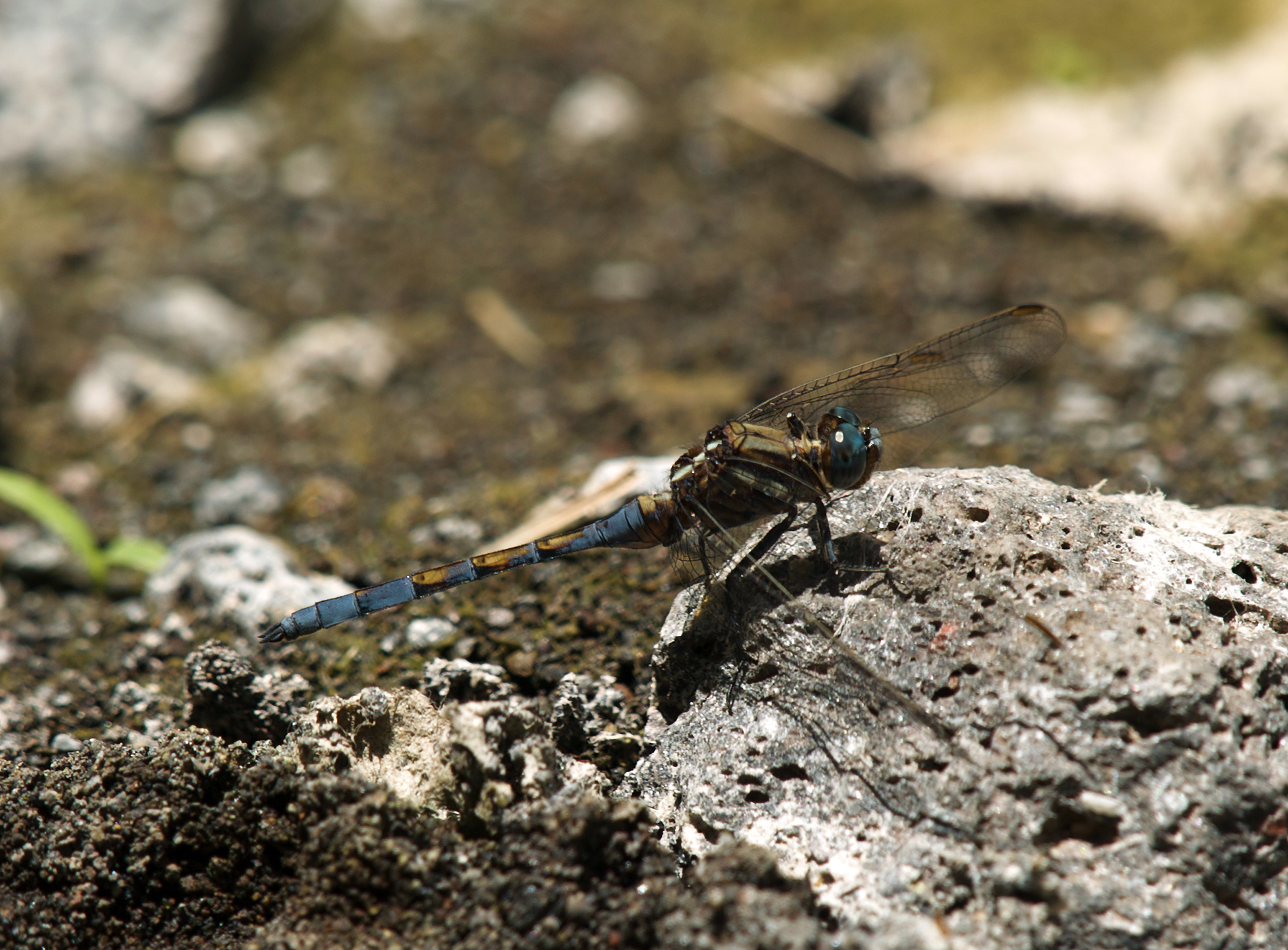
Young adult male
