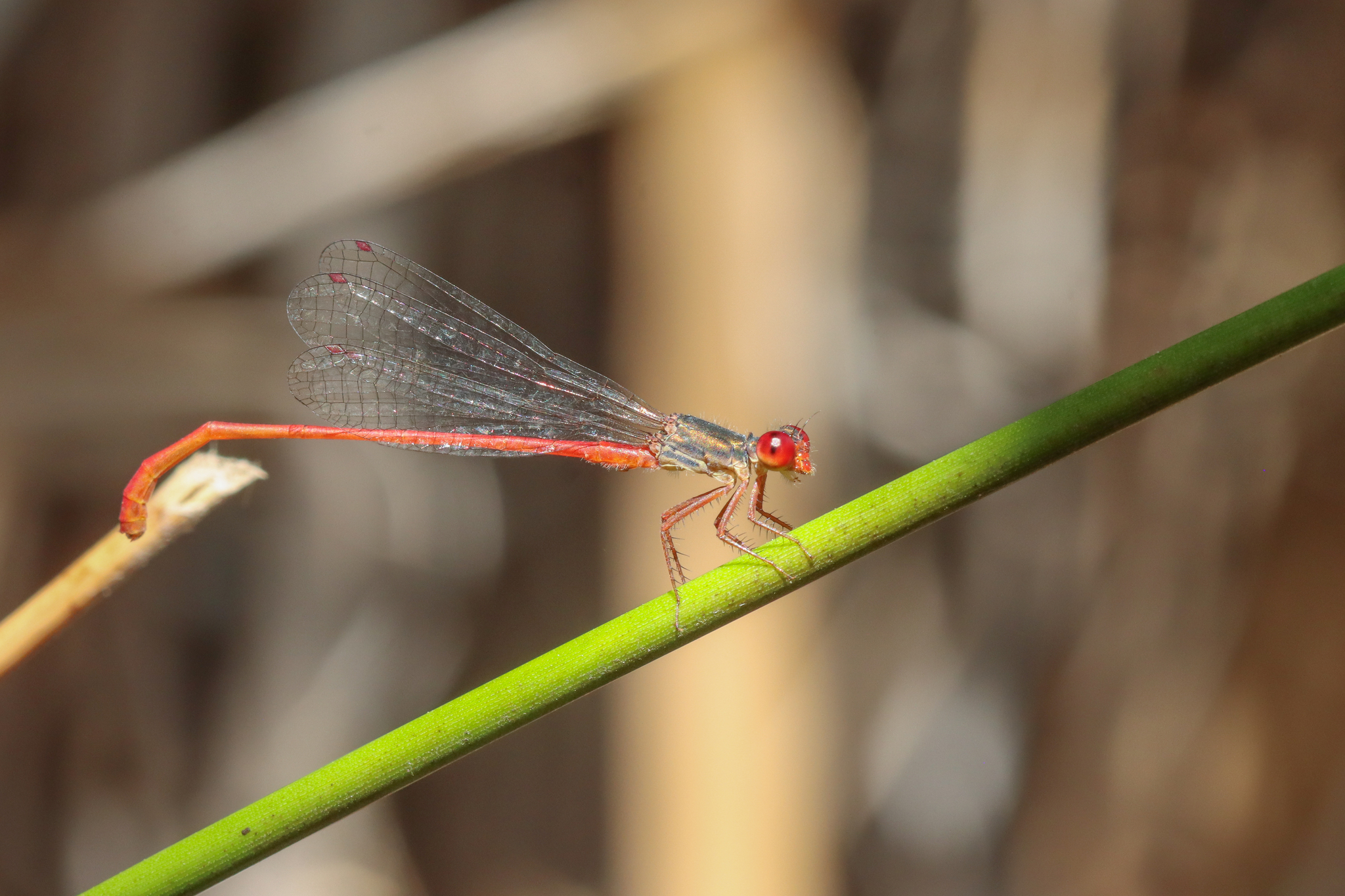
- Ceriagrion georgifreyi in Israel

Conservation status
- Endangered (IUCN 3.1)

Scientific classification
- Kingdom: Animalia
- Phylum: Arthropoda
- Class: Insecta
- Order: Odonata
- Suborder: Zygoptera
- Family: Coenagrionidae
- Genus: Ceriagrion
- Species: C. georgifreyi

Binomial name
- Ceriagrion georgifreyi Schmidt, 1953

= Ceriagrion georgifreyi =

Species of damselfly

Ceriagrion georgifreyi, commonly known as the Turkish Red Damsel, is a species of damselfly in the family Coenagrionidae. It is found in Greece, Syria, Israel, Turkey, and possibly Lebanon. Its natural habitats are rivers and freshwater springs. It is threatened by habitat loss.
