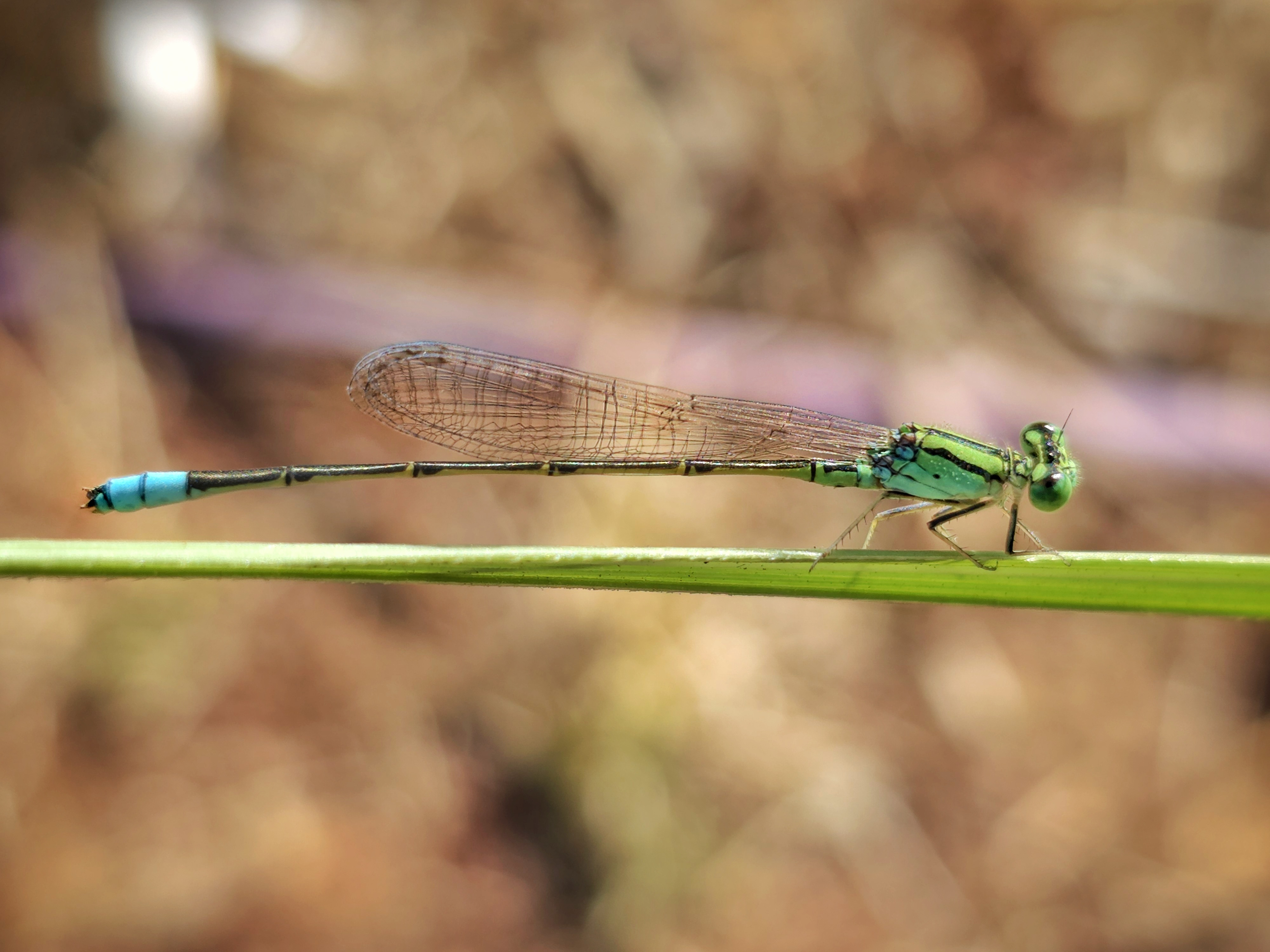
- Male, Israel

Conservation status
- Least Concern (IUCN 3.1)

Scientific classification
- Kingdom: Animalia
- Phylum: Arthropoda
- Clade: Pancrustacea
- Class: Insecta
- Order: Odonata
- Suborder: Zygoptera
- Family: Coenagrionidae
- Genus: Pseudagrion
- Species: P. torridum

Binomial name
- Pseudagrion torridum Selys, 1876

= Pseudagrion torridum =

Species of damselfly

Pseudagrion torridum is a species of damselfly in the family Coenagrionidae. It is found in Burkina Faso, Ivory Coast, Egypt, Ethiopia, Ghana, Guinea, Kenya, Mali, Nigeria, Senegal, Sudan, Tanzania, Uganda, and Zambia. Its natural habitats are freshwater lakes and freshwater marshes.
