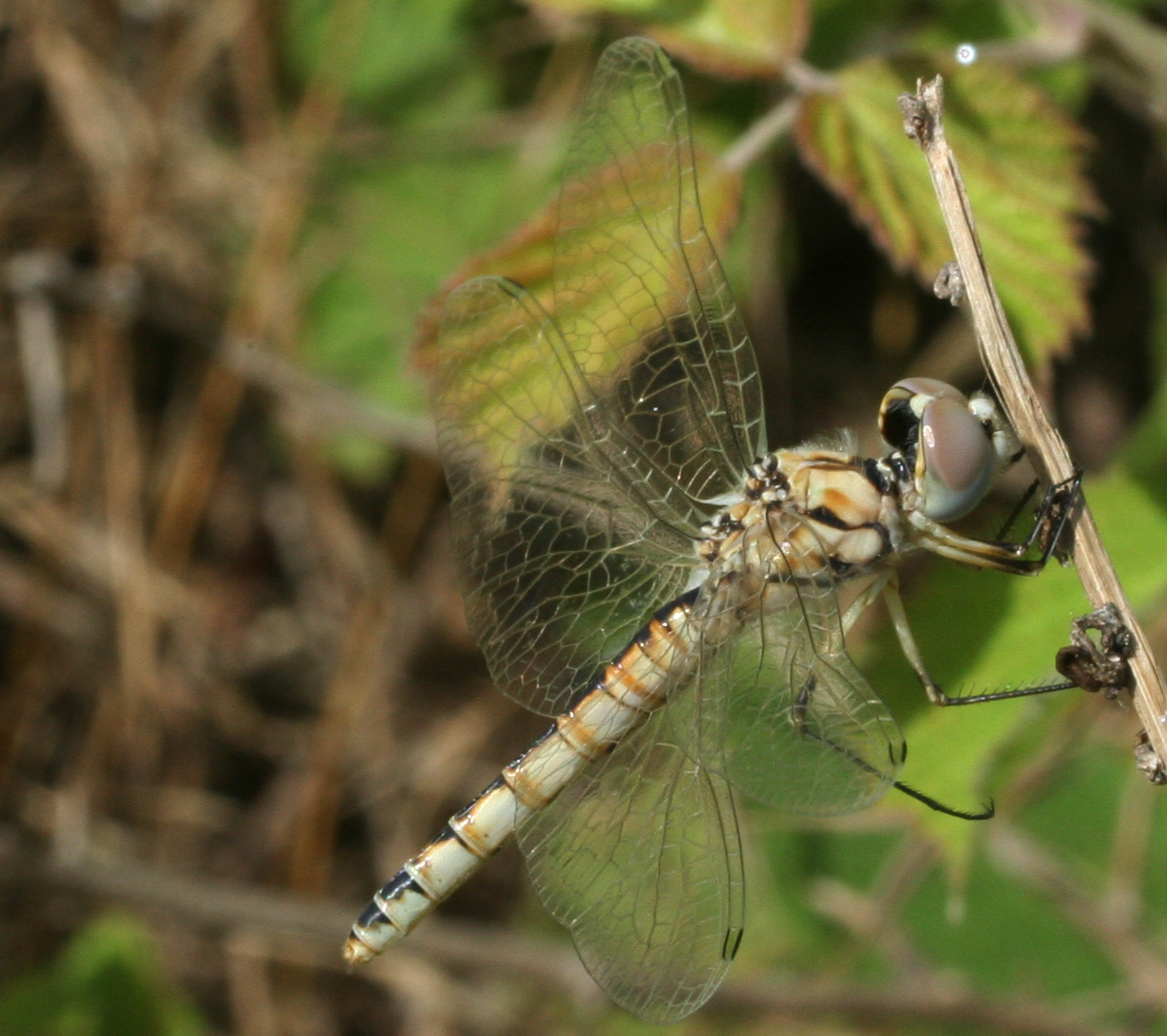
- Female, Russia.
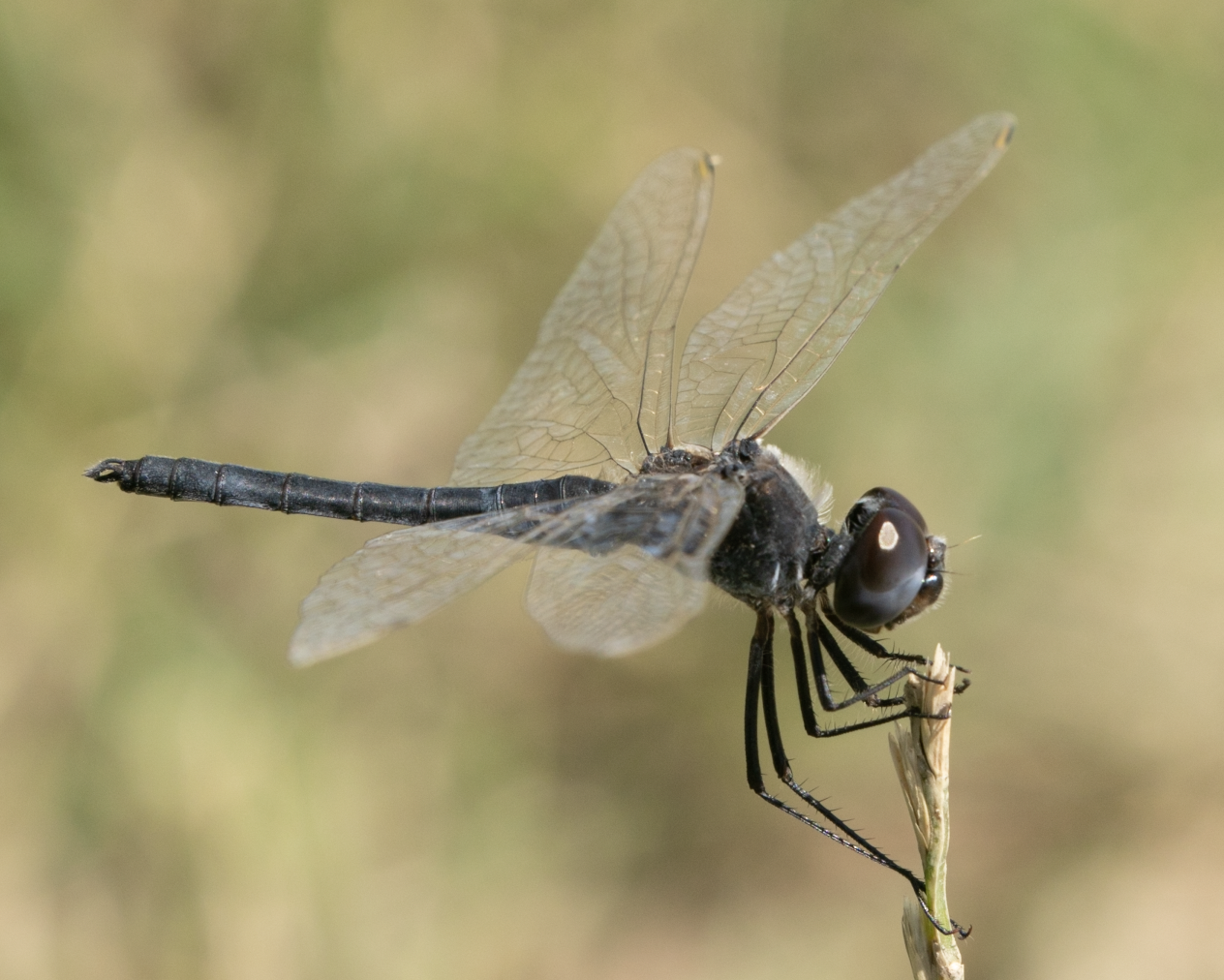
- Male, Italy

Conservation status
- Least Concern (IUCN 3.1)

Scientific classification
- Kingdom: Animalia
- Phylum: Arthropoda
- Clade: Pancrustacea
- Class: Insecta
- Order: Odonata
- Infraorder: Anisoptera
- Family: Libellulidae
- Genus: Selysiothemis; Ris, 1897
- Species: S. nigra

Binomial name
- Selysiothemis nigra (Vander Linden, 1825)

= Black pennant =

Species of dragonfly

The black pennant (Selysiothemis nigra) is the only species in the monotypic dragonfly genus Selysiothemis, in the family Libellulidae. It occurs in Central Asia and the Middle East. In Europe it is mostly confined to the coastal areas of the Mediterranean and the Black Sea.

== Description ==
The abdomen, which is around 20 mm long, is black in fully coloured males and has a white dusting on the underside. Juvenile males and females, on the other hand, are pale grey-yellow with black markings. This consists of a dorsal stripe on the second and third segments, as well as on the transverse edges of these segments. The dorsal stripe continues but is interrupted on segments four to seven at the transition to the next segment. It also narrows on these segments in the middle of the segment. It becomes wider again on the eighth to tenth segments. The upper abdominal appendages are shorter than the ninth segment and, seen from the side, are curved almost in a semicircle. The broad and blunt lower abdominal appendages are only slightly shorter than the upper ones.

In adult males, the thorax is also black and the belly is whitish. There are also white hairs. The females, on the other hand, are golden brown and become whitish towards the bottom. The legs are black and yellowish white on the hips (coxa) and on the inside of the thigh (femur). The hind wings, measuring around 25 mm, are transparent like the forewings and have a white wing mark (pterostigma). The wing veins are white.

While the lower lip (labium) is whitish in adult males, it is yellowish white in juvenile males and females. The upper lip (labrum) is dull orange. The face and the adjoining forehead (frons) are greyish olive in colour, darkening towards the middle in adult males and greenish white in females and males whose colour has not yet fully developed. In addition, the latter have a sharply defined forehead basal line. The vertex is also dark olive in colour.

== Sources ==
- Martin Schorr; Martin Lindeboom; Dennis Paulson. "World Odonata List". University of Puget Sound.
- Dow, R.A. (2013). "Selysiothemis nigra". IUCN Red List of Threatened Species. 2013 e.T165471A17537803. doi:10.2305/IUCN.UK.2013-1.RLTS.T165471A17537803.en.
