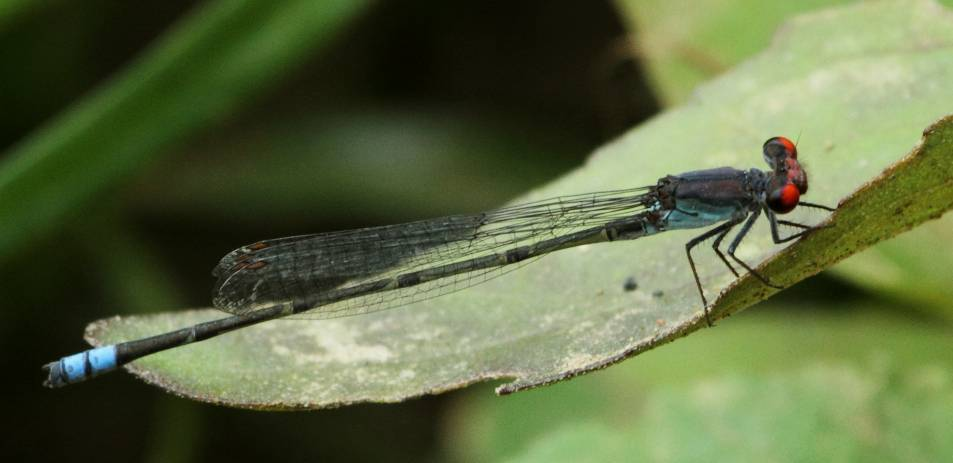
- Male

Conservation status
- Least Concern (IUCN 3.1)

Scientific classification
- Kingdom: Animalia
- Phylum: Arthropoda
- Clade: Pancrustacea
- Class: Insecta
- Order: Odonata
- Suborder: Zygoptera
- Family: Coenagrionidae
- Genus: Pseudagrion
- Species: P. sublacteum

Binomial name
- Pseudagrion sublacteum (Karsch, 1893)

= Pseudagrion sublacteum =

Cherry-eye sprite

Species of damselfly

Pseudagrion sublacteum or cherry-eye sprite is a species of damselfly in the family Coenagrionidae. It is found in Africa from northern South Africa to West and North Africa, and in the Middle East.

Its natural habitats are subtropical or tropical streams and rivers.

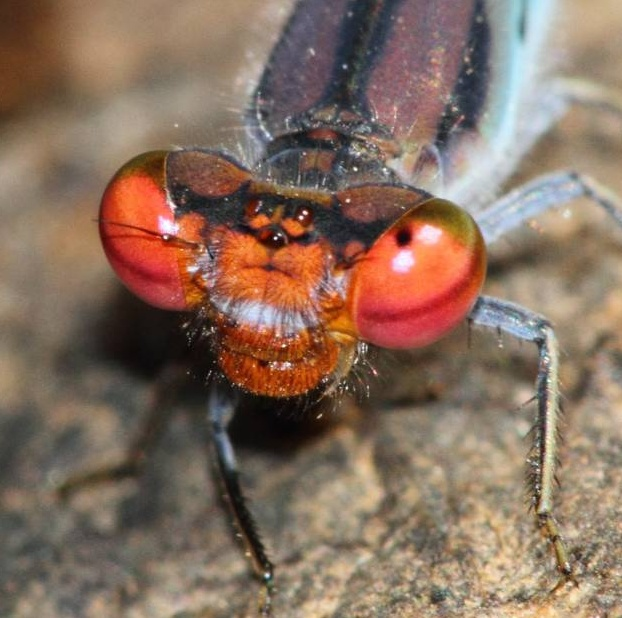
Male cherry-eye sprite.

A medium-sized damselfly (length 32–41 mm; wingspan 42–48 mm). The face is brick red and the front of the eyes are cherry-red; the back of the eyes are black above and green below; it has mauvish reddish brown post-ocular spots that are joined by a stripe of the same colour. The synthorax is mauvish brown (ageing to purplish brown) with black stripes above; the sides are light blue. The abdomen is black above and green below; segments eight and nine are bright blue with narrow black rings at their ends and segment ten is black above with bright blue sides. Cerci are longer than paraprocts, which are hatchet shaped with a dorsal knob.
