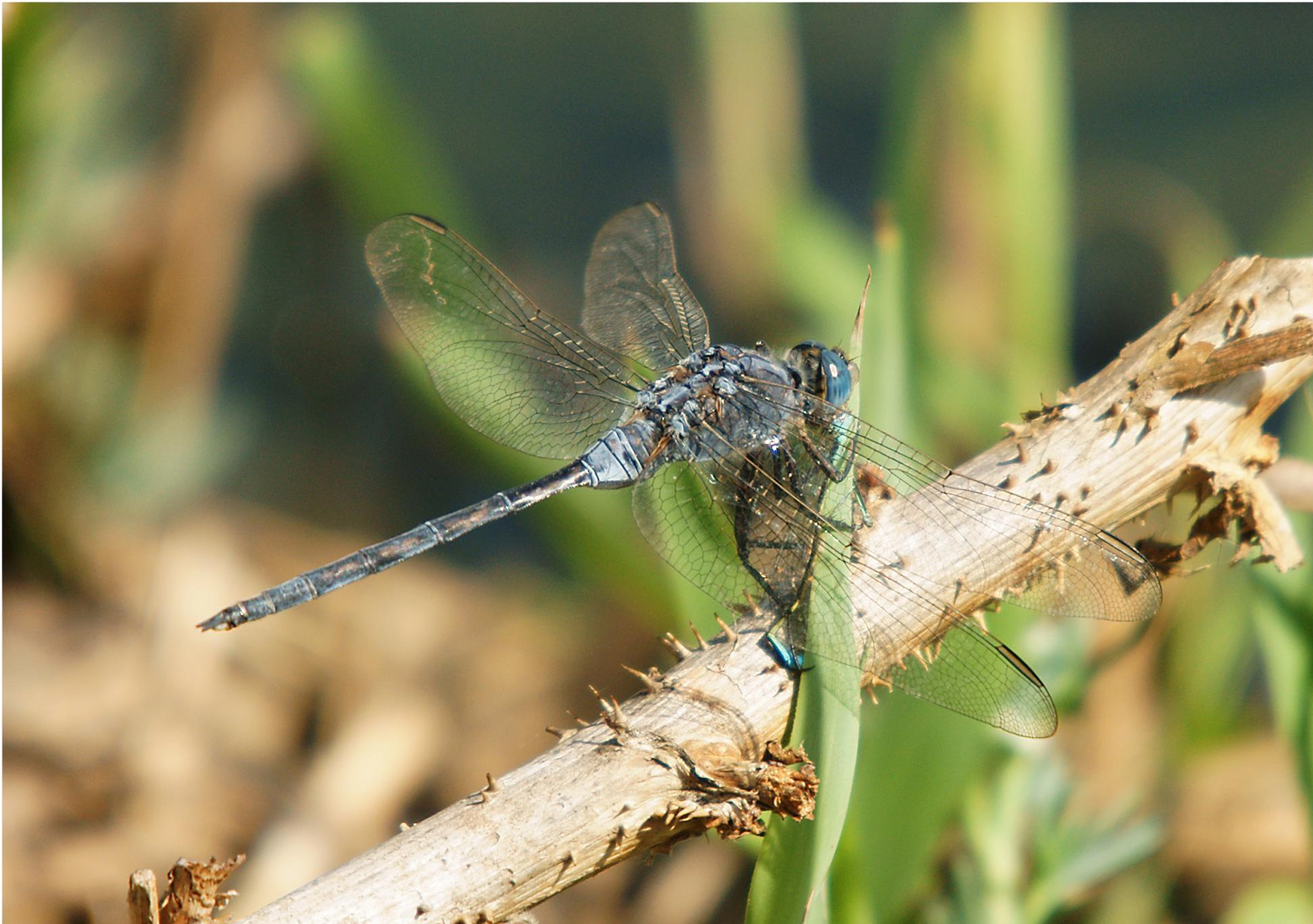
- Male eats a Blue-tailed damselfly
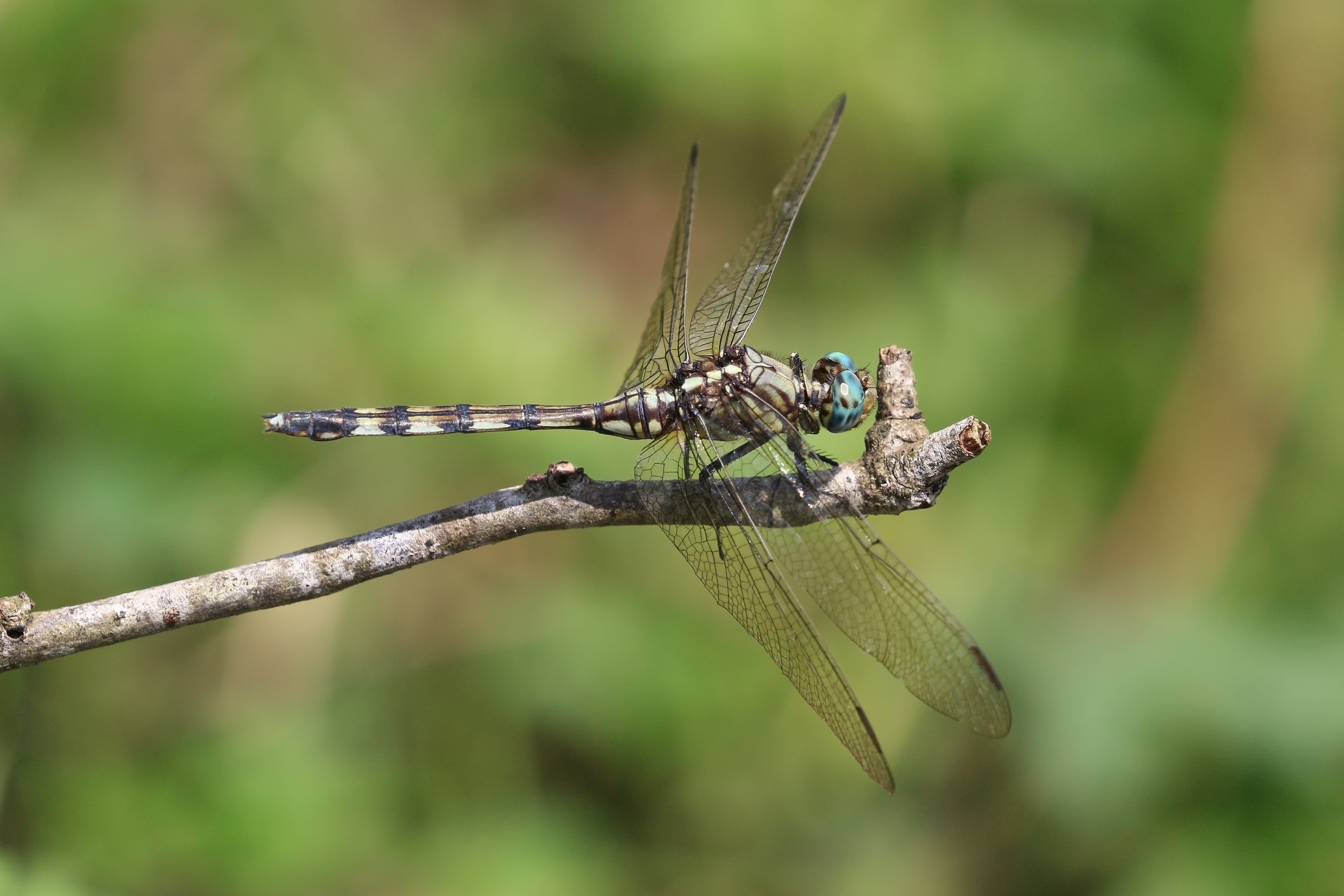
- Female; Queen Elizabeth National Park, Uganda

Conservation status
- Least Concern (IUCN 3.1)

Scientific classification
- Kingdom: Animalia
- Phylum: Arthropoda
- Clade: Pancrustacea
- Class: Insecta
- Order: Odonata
- Infraorder: Anisoptera
- Family: Libellulidae
- Genus: Orthetrum
- Species: O. trinacria

Binomial name
- Orthetrum trinacria (Selys, 1841)

Synonyms
- Libellula trinacria Selys, 1841

= Orthetrum trinacria =

Species of dragonfly

Orthetrum trinacria, the Long Skimmer, is a species of dragonfly in the family Libellulidae. It is found in Algeria, Angola, Botswana, Burkina Faso, Cameroon, Ivory Coast, Egypt, Ethiopia, France (Corsica), Gambia, Ghana, Italy (Sicily and Sardinia), Kenya, Libya, Madagascar, Malawi, Mali, Morocco, Mozambique, Namibia, Niger, Nigeria, Senegal, Somalia, South Africa, Tanzania, Togo, Uganda, Zambia, Zimbabwe, and possibly Burundi. It was recently recorded in the Maltese Islands in 2003 and was recorded breeding on the island of Gozo in 2004. Its natural habitats are rivers, shrub-dominated wetlands, swamps, freshwater lakes, intermittent freshwater lakes, freshwater marshes, and intermittent freshwater marshes. Also breeding in Southern Spain (Murcia and Malaga Provinces) and the Canary Islands.
