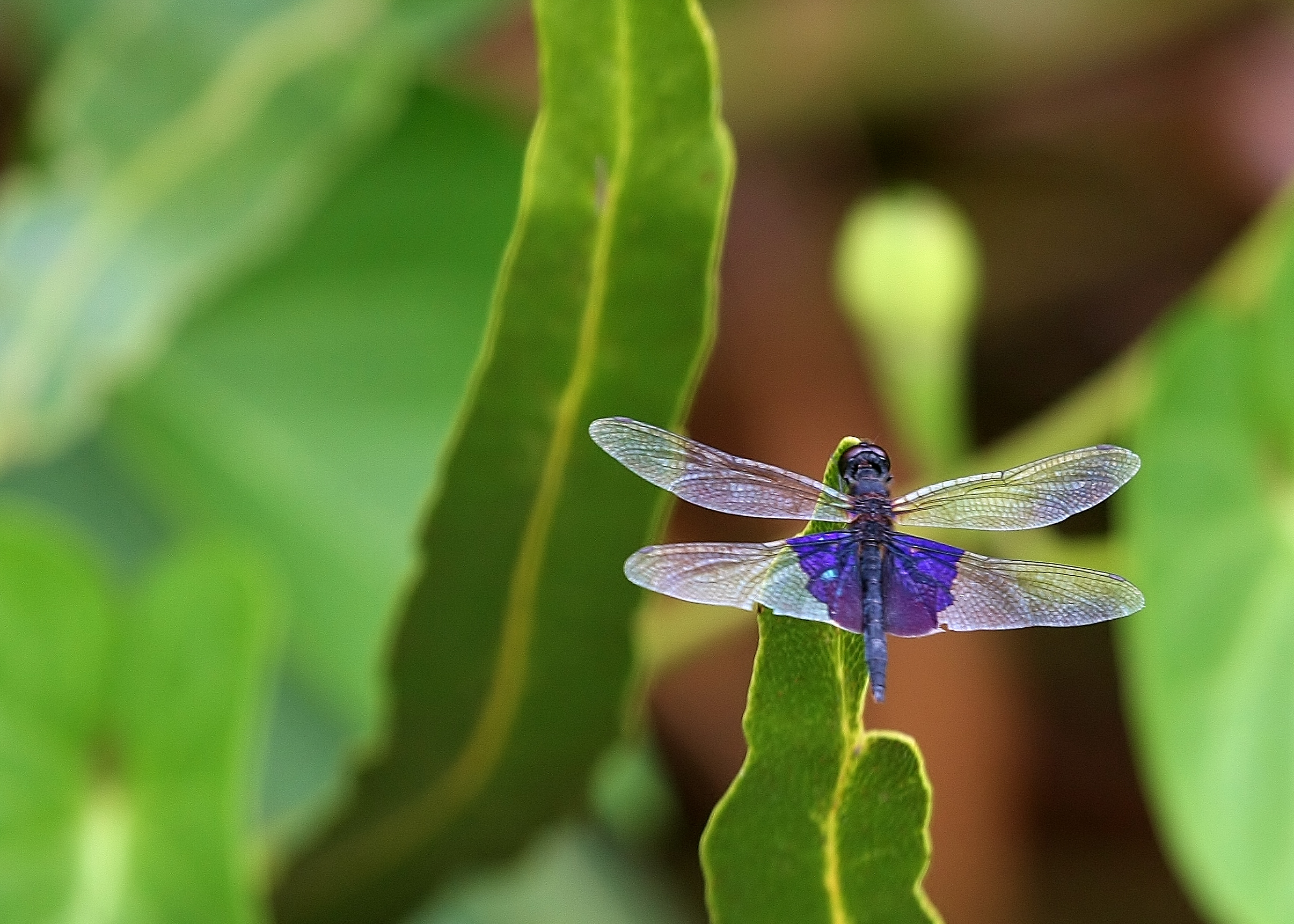

Conservation status
- Least Concern (IUCN 3.1)

Scientific classification
- Kingdom: Animalia
- Phylum: Arthropoda
- Class: Insecta
- Order: Odonata
- Infraorder: Anisoptera
- Family: Libellulidae
- Genus: Rhyothemis
- Species: R. semihyalina

Binomial name
- Rhyothemis semihyalina (Desjardins, 1832)

= Rhyothemis semihyalina =

Species of dragonfly

Rhyothemis semihyalina, the Phantom Flutterer, is a species of dragonfly in the family Libellulidae. It is found in Algeria, Angola, Benin, Botswana, Cameroon, Ivory Coast, Egypt, Ethiopia, Gambia, Ghana, Kenya, Liberia, Madagascar, Malawi, Mauritania, Mauritius, Mozambique, Namibia, Nigeria, Réunion, Senegal, Seychelles, Sierra Leone, Somalia, South Africa, Tanzania, Togo, Uganda, Zambia, Zimbabwe, and possibly Burundi. Its natural habitats are subtropical or tropical seasonally wet or flooded lowland grassland, rivers, intermittent rivers, shrub-dominated wetlands, swamps, freshwater lakes, intermittent freshwater lakes, freshwater marshes, and intermittent freshwater marshes.

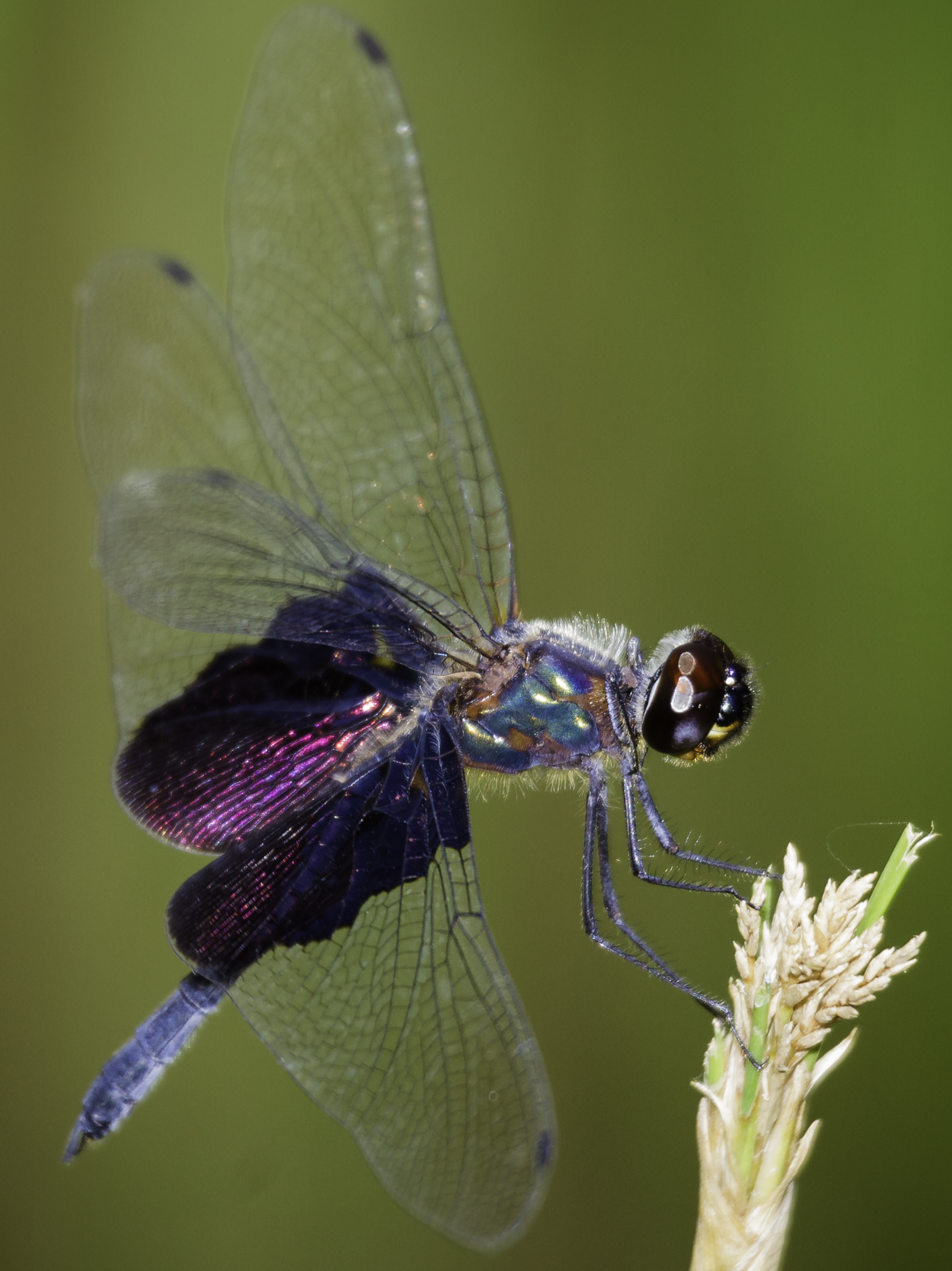
Phantom flutterer male – Tshipise, South Africa
