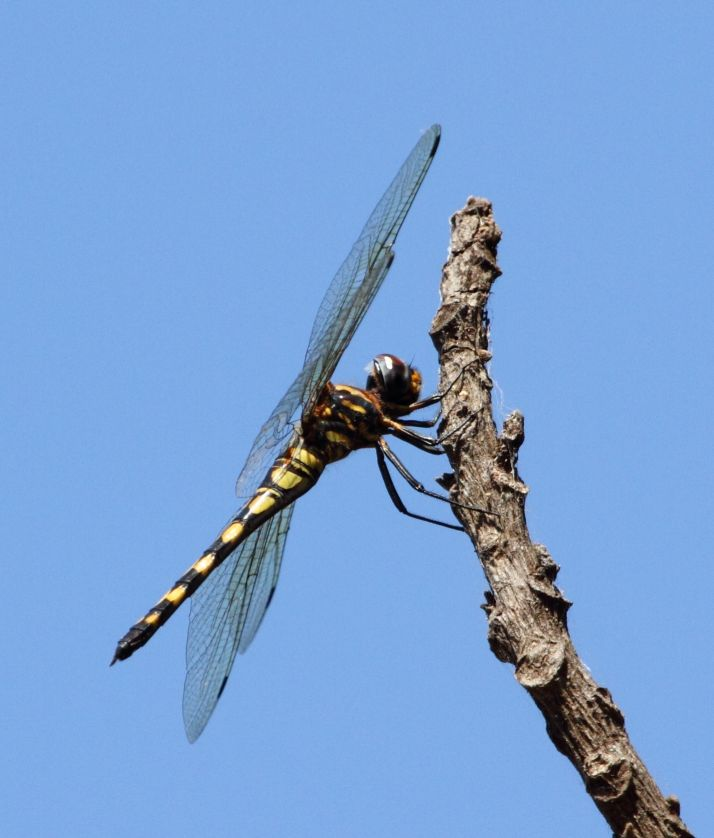
- Female
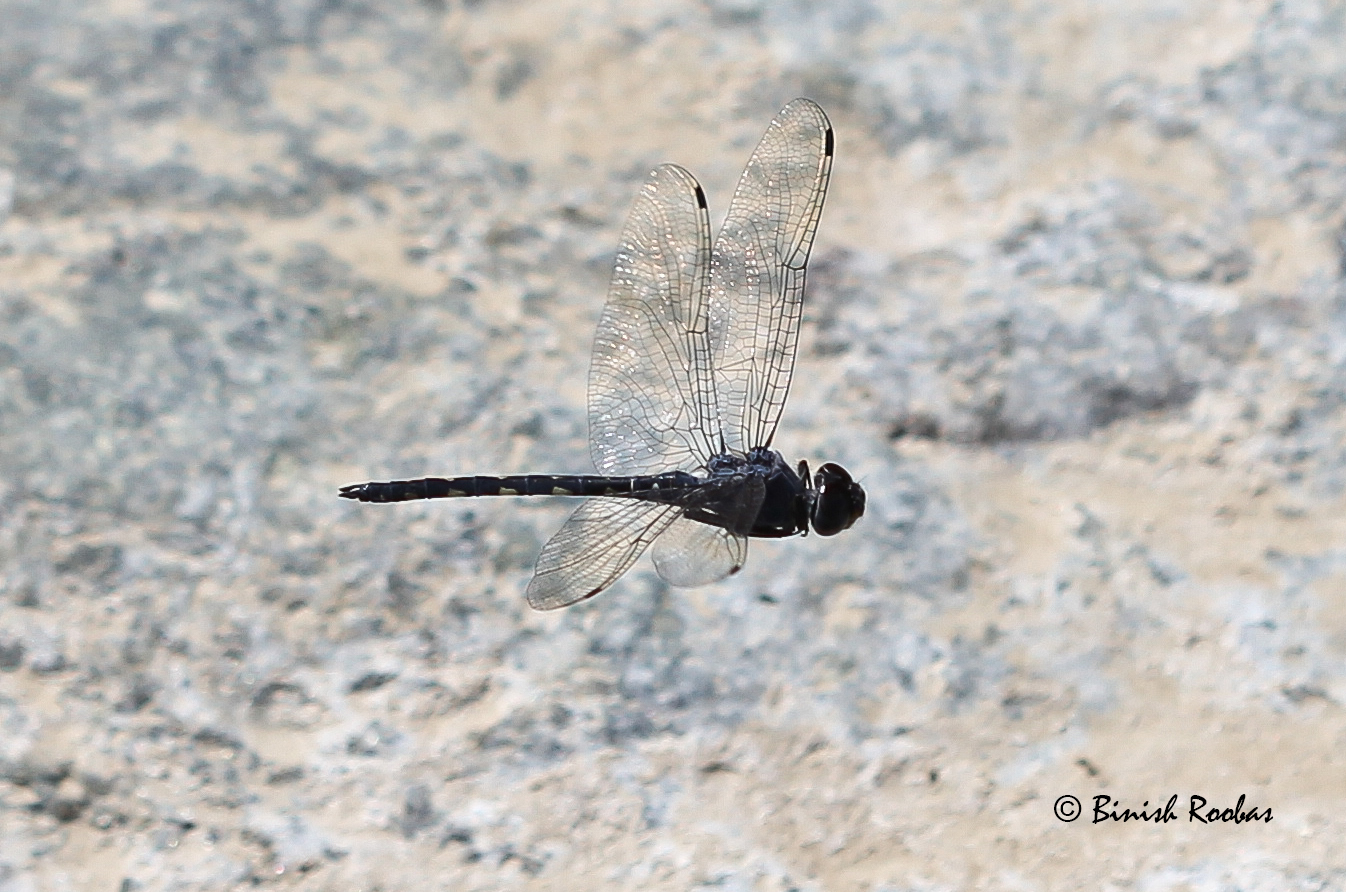
- From United Arab Emirates

Conservation status
- Least Concern (IUCN 3.1)

Scientific classification
- Kingdom: Animalia
- Phylum: Arthropoda
- Class: Insecta
- Order: Odonata
- Infraorder: Anisoptera
- Family: Libellulidae
- Genus: Zygonyx
- Species: Z. torridus

Binomial name
- Zygonyx torridus (Kirby, 1889)

= Zygonyx torridus =

Species of dragonfly

Zygonyx torridus is a species of dragonfly in the family Libellulidae. It is found in Algeria, Angola, Benin, Botswana, Burkina Faso, Cameroon, Central African Republic, Comoros, the Republic of the Congo, Ivory Coast, Egypt, Ethiopia, Israel, Italy (Sicily), Gambia, Ghana, Guinea, Kenya, Liberia, Malawi, Mali, Mauritius, Morocco, Mozambique, Namibia, Nigeria, Réunion, Sierra Leone, South Africa, Spain, Sudan, Tanzania, Togo, Uganda, Zambia, Zimbabwe, the United Arab Emirates and possibly Burundi. Its natural habitat is rivers and fast flowing streams.

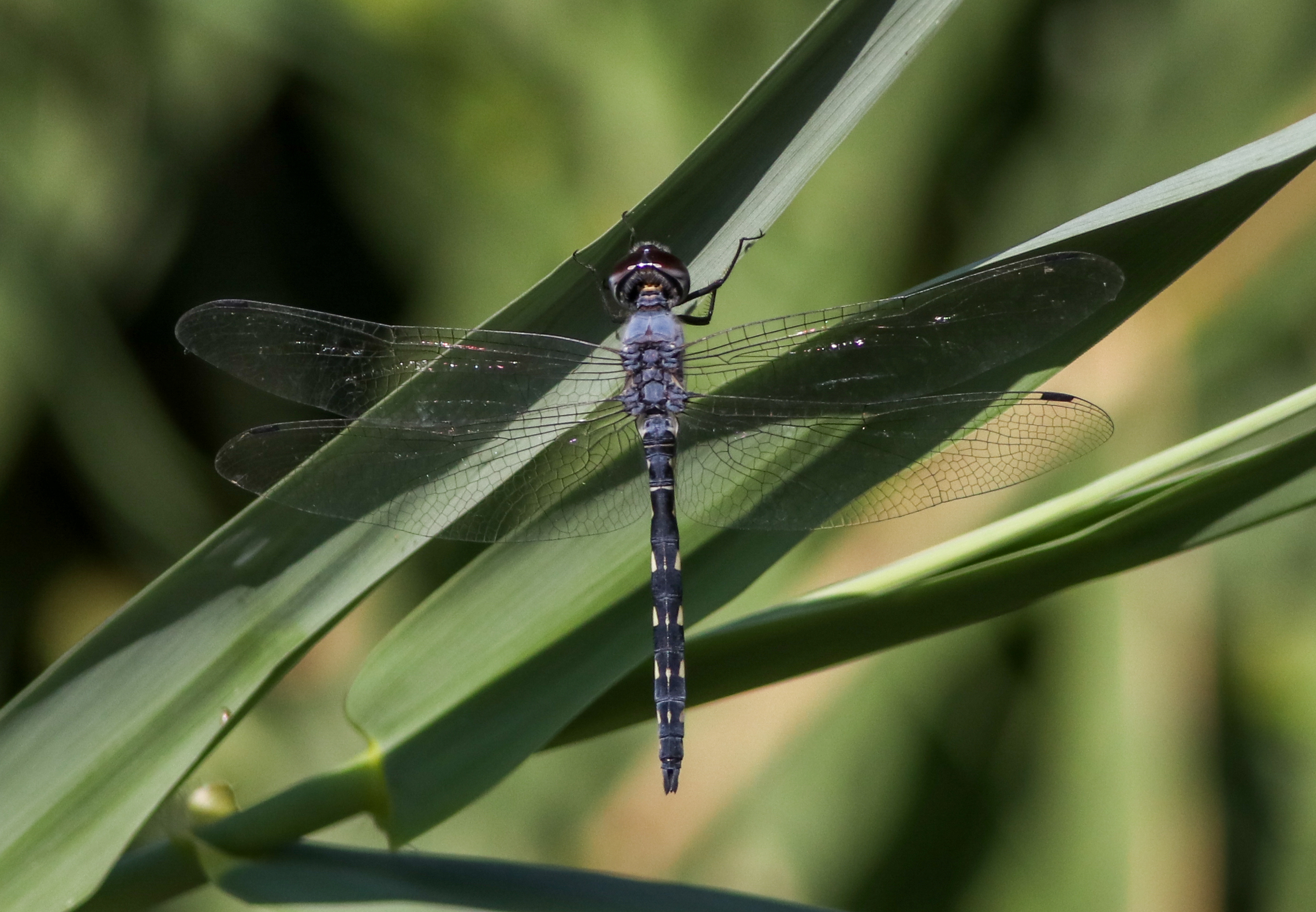
Zygonyx torridus from Fujairah, United Arab Emirates
