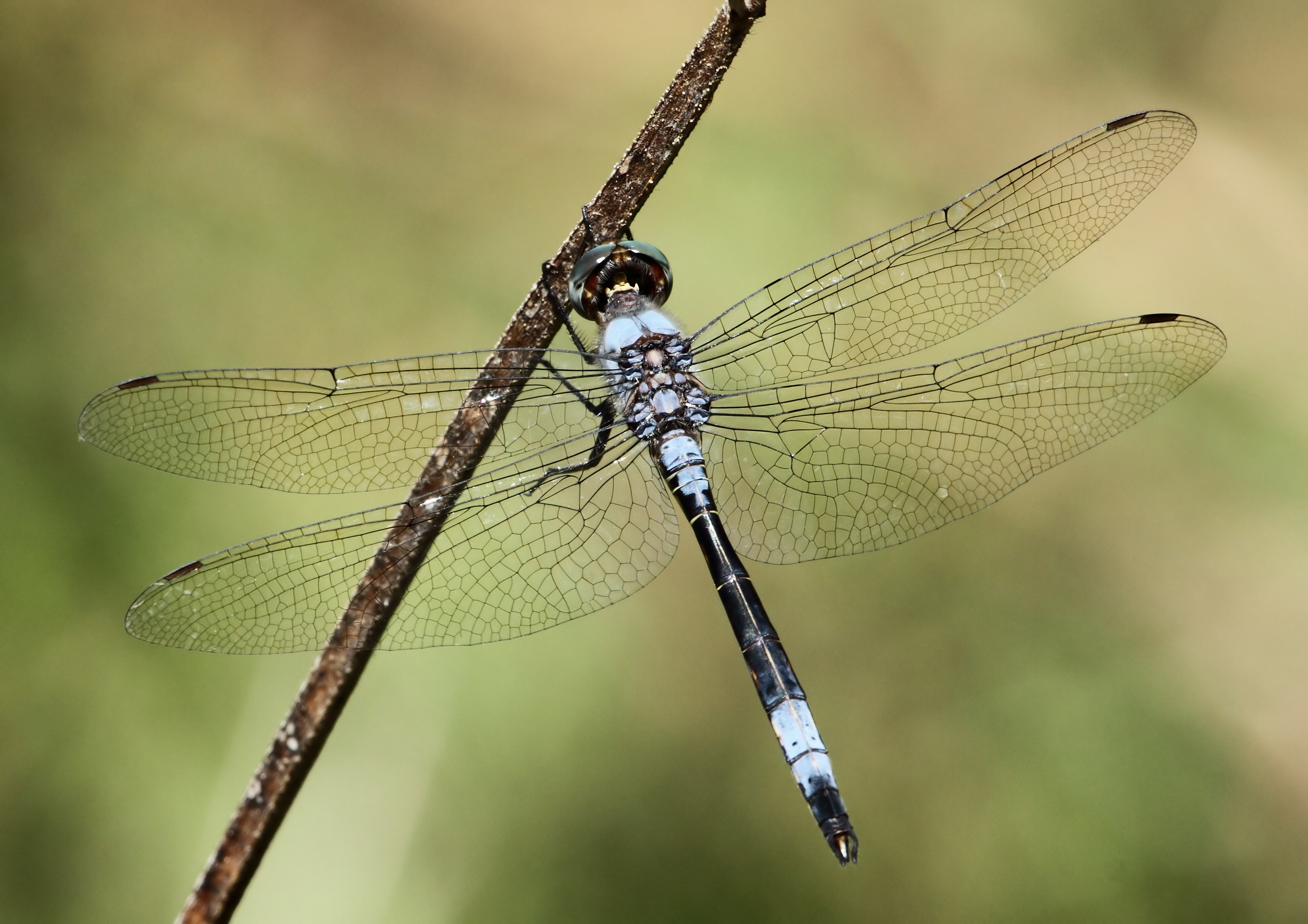
- Male

Conservation status
- Least Concern (IUCN 3.1)

Scientific classification
- Kingdom: Animalia
- Phylum: Arthropoda
- Class: Insecta
- Order: Odonata
- Infraorder: Anisoptera
- Family: Libellulidae
- Genus: Zygonyx
- Species: Z. natalensis

Binomial name
- Zygonyx natalensis (Martin, 1900)

= Zygonyx natalensis =

Species of dragonfly

Zygonyx natalensis, the blue cascader or powdered cascader, is a species of dragonfly in the family Libellulidae. It is found in most of sub-Saharan Africa.

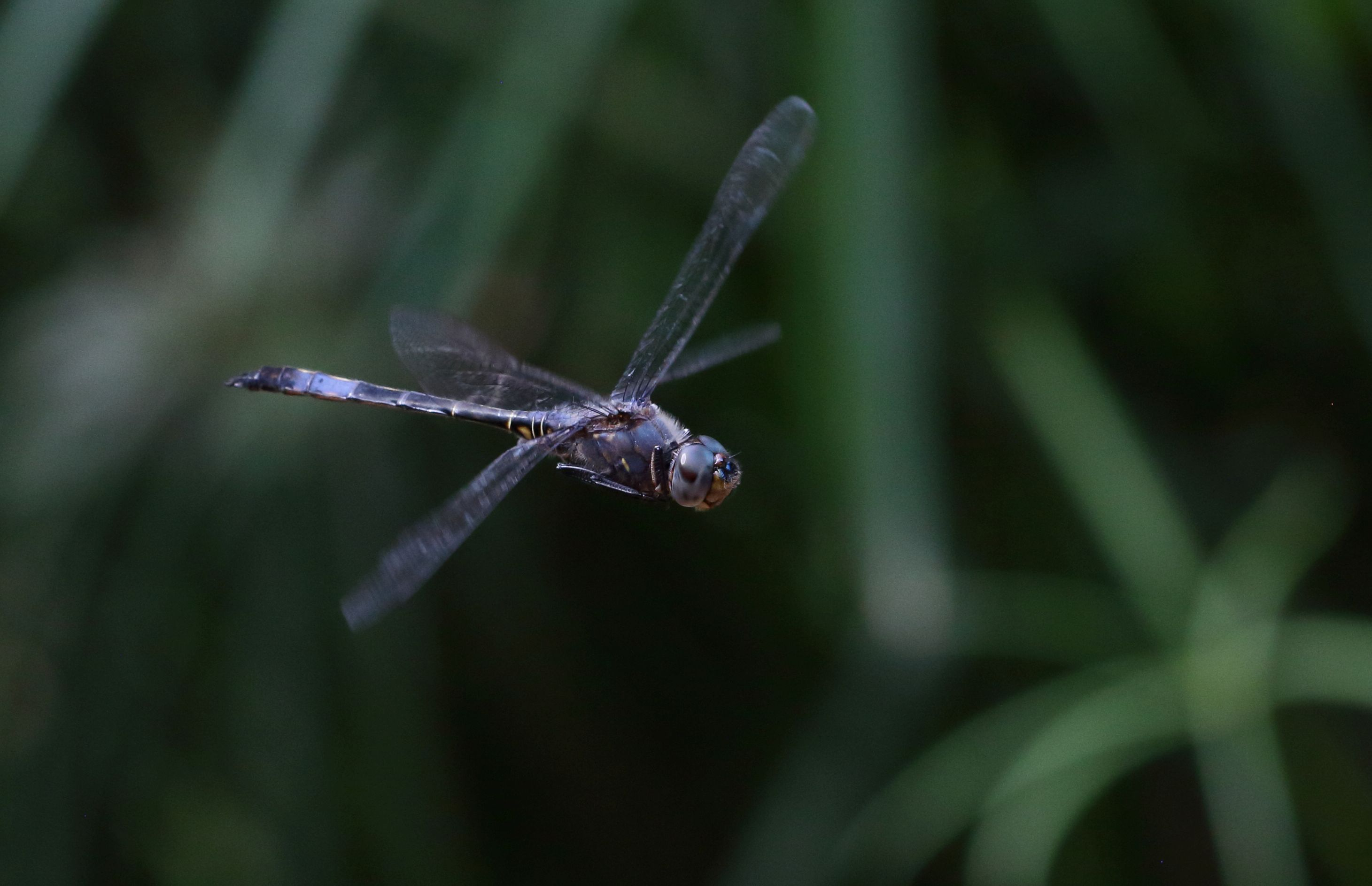
Male in flight

== Habitat ==
This species is found along streams and rivers; males are most frequently seen patrolling or hovering over rapids or waterfalls.
