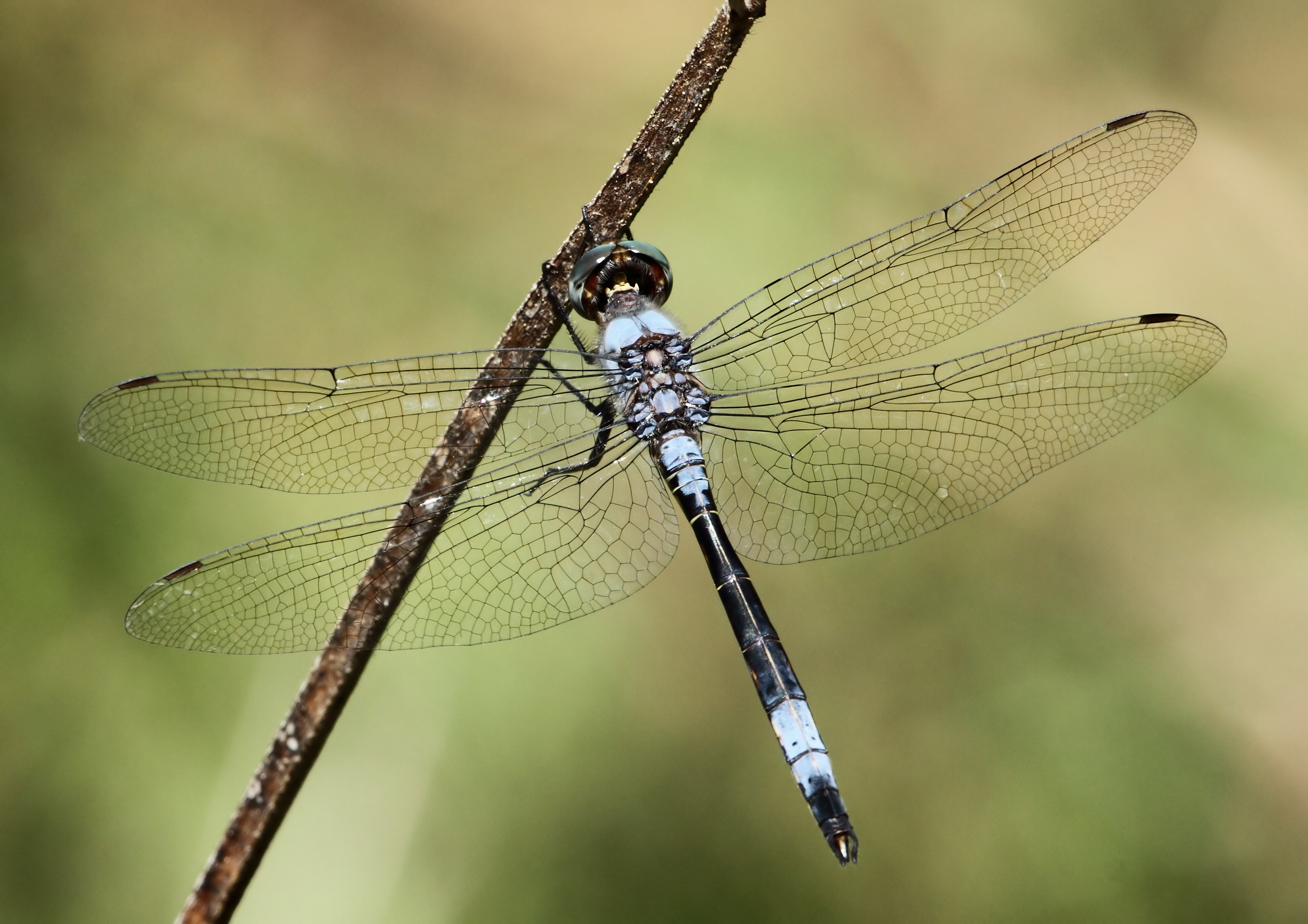
- Zygonyx natalensis

Scientific classification
- Kingdom: Animalia
- Phylum: Arthropoda
- Class: Insecta
- Order: Odonata
- Infraorder: Anisoptera
- Family: Libellulidae
- Subfamily: Zygonychinae
- Genus: Zygonyx; Hagen, 1867

= Zygonyx =

Genus of dragonflies

Zygonyx is a genus of dragonflies in the family Libellulidae. They are commonly known as cascaders because of their preference for living beside waterfalls and flying through the spray. They lay their eggs in wet dangling roots.

== Species ==
The genus contains the following species:

- Zygonyx annika Dijkstra, 2015
- Zygonyx asahinai Matsuki & Saito, 1995
- Zygonyx atritibiae Pinhey, 1964
- Zygonyx chrysobaphes (Ris, 1915)
- Zygonyx constellatus Nicolas, 2022
- Zygonyx denticulatus Dijkstra & Kipping, 2015
- Zygonyx dionyx Dijkstra & Mézière, 2015
- Zygonyx elisabethae Lieftinck, 1963
- Zygonyx eusebia (Ris, 1912)
- Zygonyx flavicosta (Sjöstedt, 1900)
- Zygonyx geminuncus Legrand, 1997
- Zygonyx hova (Rambur, 1842)
- Zygonyx ida Hagen, 1867
- Zygonyx ilia Ris, 1912
- Zygonyx immaculata Fraser, 1933
- Zygonyx iris Selys, 1869 - Emerald Cascader
- Zygonyx luctifer Selys, 1869
- Zygonyx natalensis (Martin, 1900) - Blue Cascader, Powdered Cascader, Scuffed Cascader
- Zygonyx ranavalonae Fraser, 1949
- Zygonyx regisalberti (Schouteden, 1934)
- Zygonyx speciosus (Karsch, 1891)
- Zygonyx takasago Asahina, 1966
- Zygonyx torridus (Kirby, 1889) - Ringed Cascader
- Zygonyx viridescens (Martin, 1900)
