= Zygonyx regisalberti =

Conservation status
- Least Concern (IUCN 3.1)

Scientific classification
- Kingdom: Animalia
- Phylum: Arthropoda
- Class: Insecta
- Order: Odonata
- Infraorder: Anisoptera
- Family: Libellulidae
- Genus: Zygonyx
- Species: Z. regisalberti

Binomial name
- Zygonyx regisalberti (Schouteden, 1934)

Species of dragonfly

Zygonyx regisalberti is a species of dragonfly in the family Libellulidae. It is found in Angola, Cameroon, the Republic of the Congo, the Democratic Republic of the Congo, Ghana, Guinea, Liberia, Nigeria, Sierra Leone, Tanzania, Togo, and Uganda. Its natural habitats are subtropical or tropical moist lowland forests and rivers.
