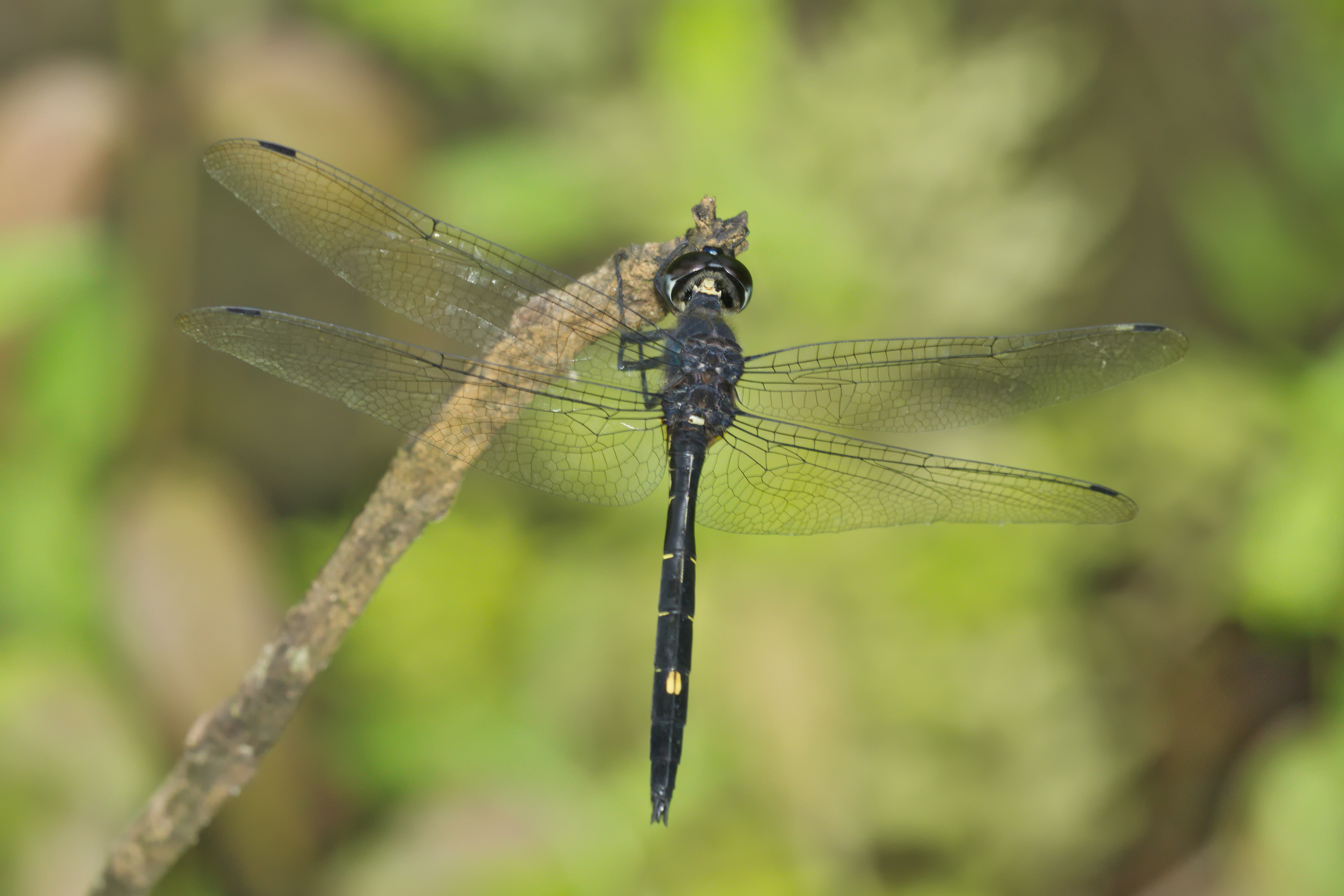

Conservation status
- Least Concern (IUCN 3.1)

Scientific classification
- Kingdom: Animalia
- Phylum: Arthropoda
- Class: Insecta
- Order: Odonata
- Infraorder: Anisoptera
- Family: Libellulidae
- Genus: Zygonyx
- Species: Z. iris

Binomial name
- Zygonyx iris Selys, 1869

= Zygonyx iris =

Species of dragonfly

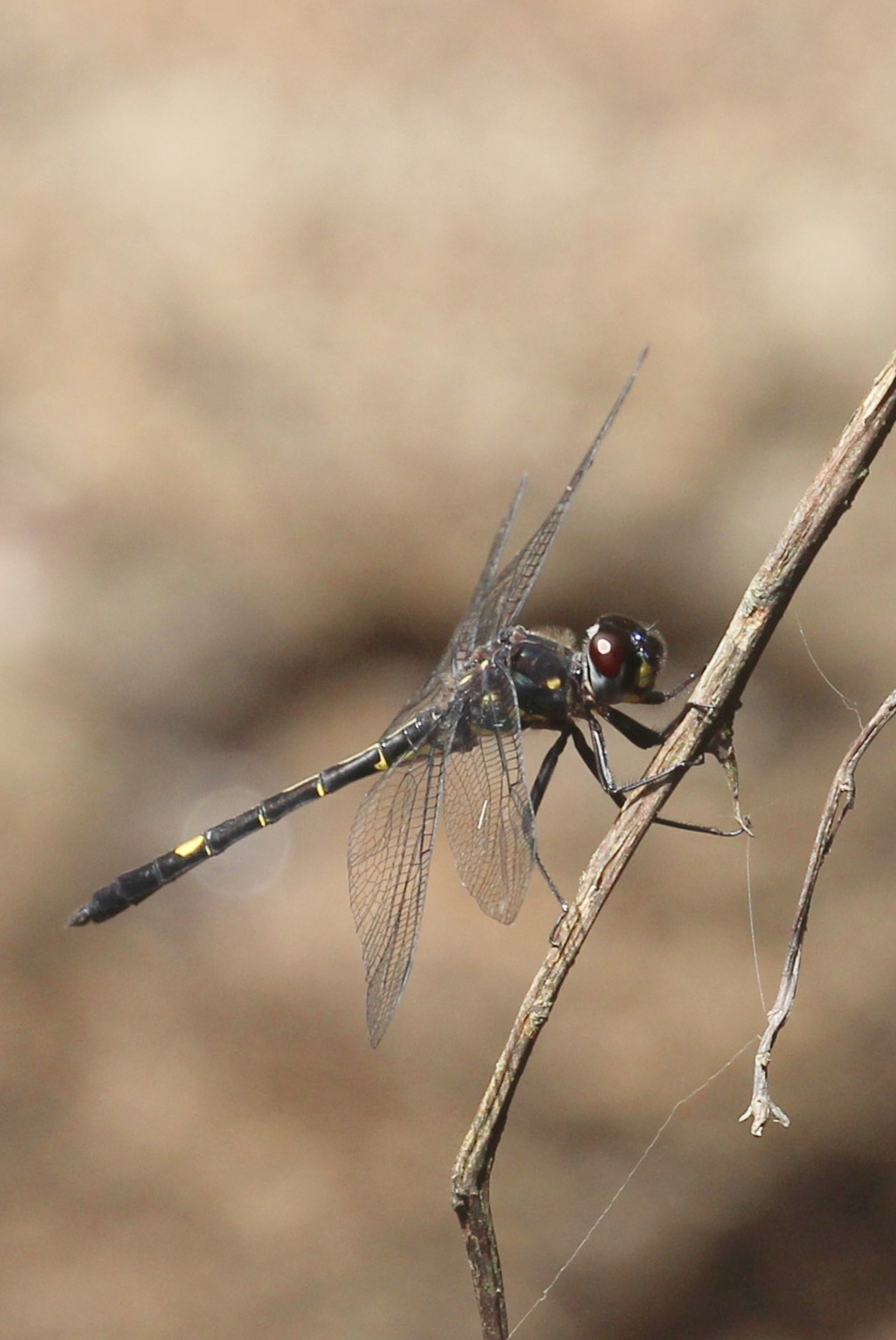
Zygonyx iris photo from wayanad Kerala

Zygonyx iris, the emerald cascader or iridescent stream glider, is a species of dragonfly in the family Libellulidae. It is widespread in many Asian countries.

== Subspecies ==
A number of subspecies of Zygonyx iris have been described, but it is not clear if these merely represent extremes of geographical variation or genuine subspecies.

- Zygonyx iris ceylonicus (Kirby, 1905)
- Zygonyx iris davina Fraser, 1926
- Zygonyx iris errans Lieftinck, 1953
- Zygonyx iris insignis (Kirby 1900)
- Zygonyx iris intermedia Lahiri 1987
- Zygonyx iris iris Selys, 1869
- Zygonyx iris isa Fraser, 1926
- Zygonyx iris malabaricus Fraser, 1926
- Zygonyx iris malayanus (Laidlaw, 1902)
- Zygonyx iris metallicus Fraser, 1931
- Zygonyx iris mildredae Fraser, 1926
- Zygonyx iris osiris Fraser, 1936

== Description and habitat ==
It is a dark metallic blue dragonfly with brown eyes. Its thorax has broad humeral stripe in yellow. Its abdomen is black with sides of segments 1 to 3 broadly yellow. There is a yellow mid-dorsal carina from segments 1 to 6. There is a big yellow spot on segment 7. Female is similar to the male.

It breeds in the swift rocky streams. Larva is adapted to cling on rocks. Females lay eggs in first order streams during summer. Apparently, the larva migrates to second or third order streams during their late instars from where they emerge. Males commonly found flying over brooks and streams. They tirelessly fly back and forth across a beat along a hill stream and rarely perch. Sometimes, pairs in tandem can be seen flying above torrents; the female dipping her abdomen periodically to lay eggs

== See also ==
- List of odonates of Sri Lanka
- List of odonates of India
- List of odonata of Kerala
