= Zygonyx flavicosta =

Conservation status
- Least Concern (IUCN 3.1)

Scientific classification
- Kingdom: Animalia
- Phylum: Arthropoda
- Class: Insecta
- Order: Odonata
- Infraorder: Anisoptera
- Family: Libellulidae
- Genus: Zygonyx
- Species: Z. flavicosta

Binomial name
- Zygonyx flavicosta (Sjöstedt, 1900)

Synonyms
- Zygonyx fallax (Schouteden, 1934)

Species of insect

Zygonyx flavicosta is a species of dragonfly in the family Libellulidae. It is found in Angola, Cameroon, the Democratic Republic of the Congo, Ivory Coast, Equatorial Guinea, Ghana, Liberia, Nigeria, Sierra Leone, Togo, Uganda, and Zambia. Its natural habitats are subtropical or tropical moist lowland forests and intermittent rivers.
