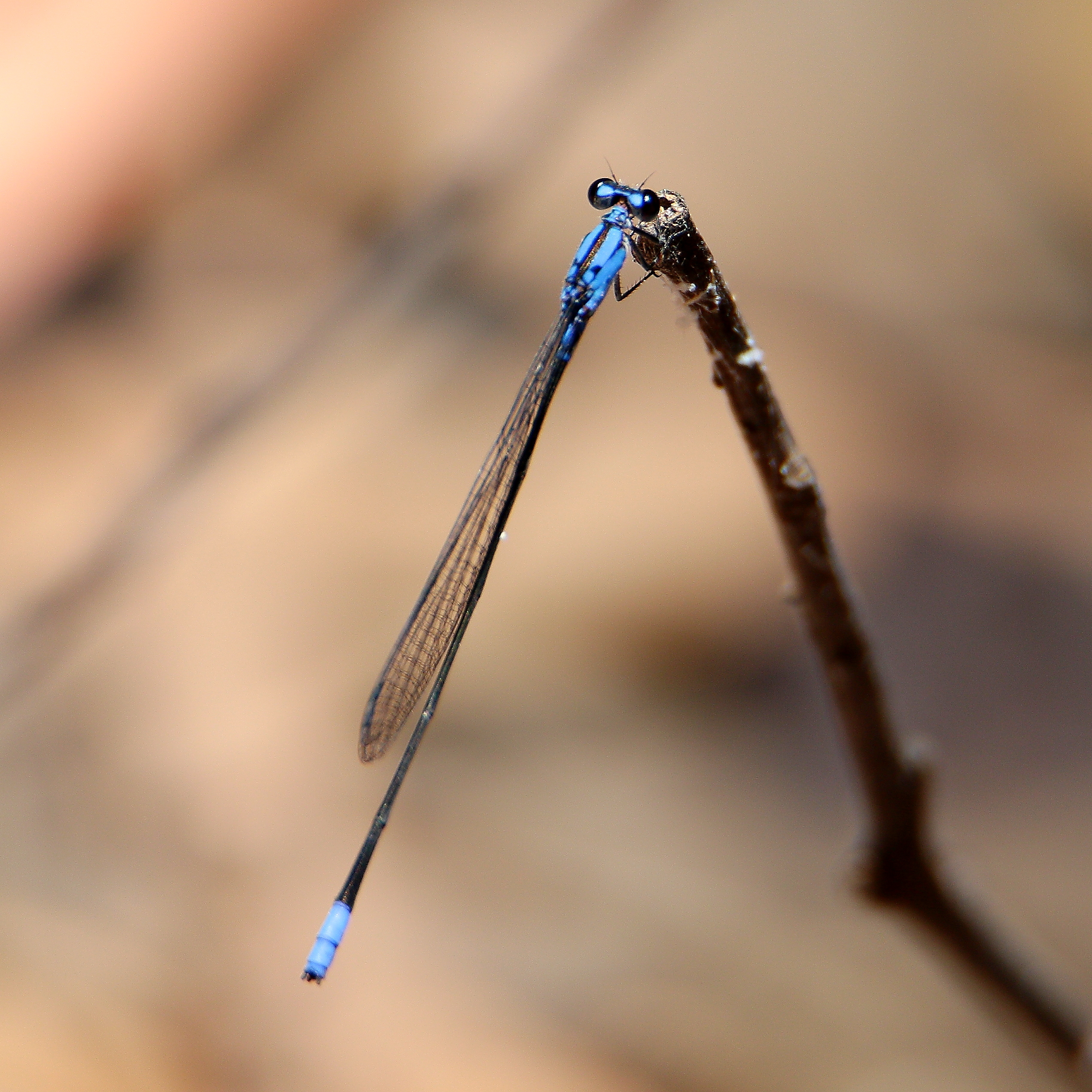
- Male, Cairns

Conservation status
- Least Concern (IUCN 3.1)

Scientific classification
- Kingdom: Animalia
- Phylum: Arthropoda
- Clade: Pancrustacea
- Class: Insecta
- Order: Odonata
- Suborder: Zygoptera
- Family: Coenagrionidae
- Genus: Archibasis
- Species: A. mimetes

Binomial name
- Archibasis mimetes (Tillyard, 1913)

Synonyms
- Stenobasis mimetes Tillyard, 1913; Pseudagrion ingrid Theischinger, 2000

= Archibasis mimetes =

Blue-banded longtail

Species of damselfly

Archibasis mimetes is a species of damselfly in the family Coenagrionidae, commonly known as a blue-banded longtail. It is a medium-sized damselfly; the male is bright blue and black. It has been recorded from New Guinea and northern Australia, where it inhabits streams.

== Etymology ==
The genus name Archibasis is derived from the Greek ἀρχή (archē, "beginning" or "origin") and βάσις (basis, "base"), referring to the distinctly narrowed base of the wings.

The species name mimetes is derived from the Greek μιμητής (mimētēs, "imitator"). Robin Tillyard named this species of damselfly for its close resemblance to Pseudagrion australasiae.

== Gallery ==
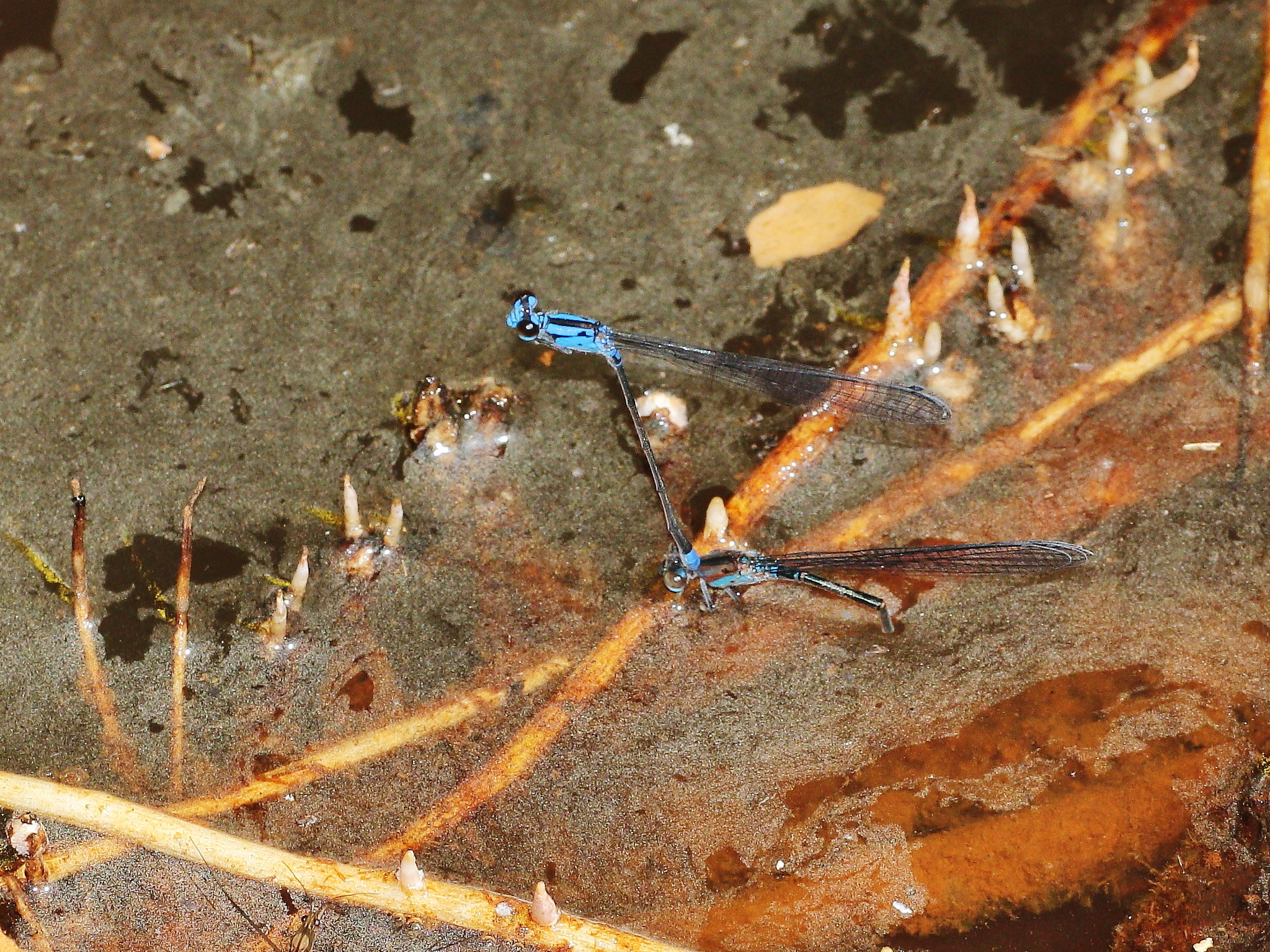
Egg-laying

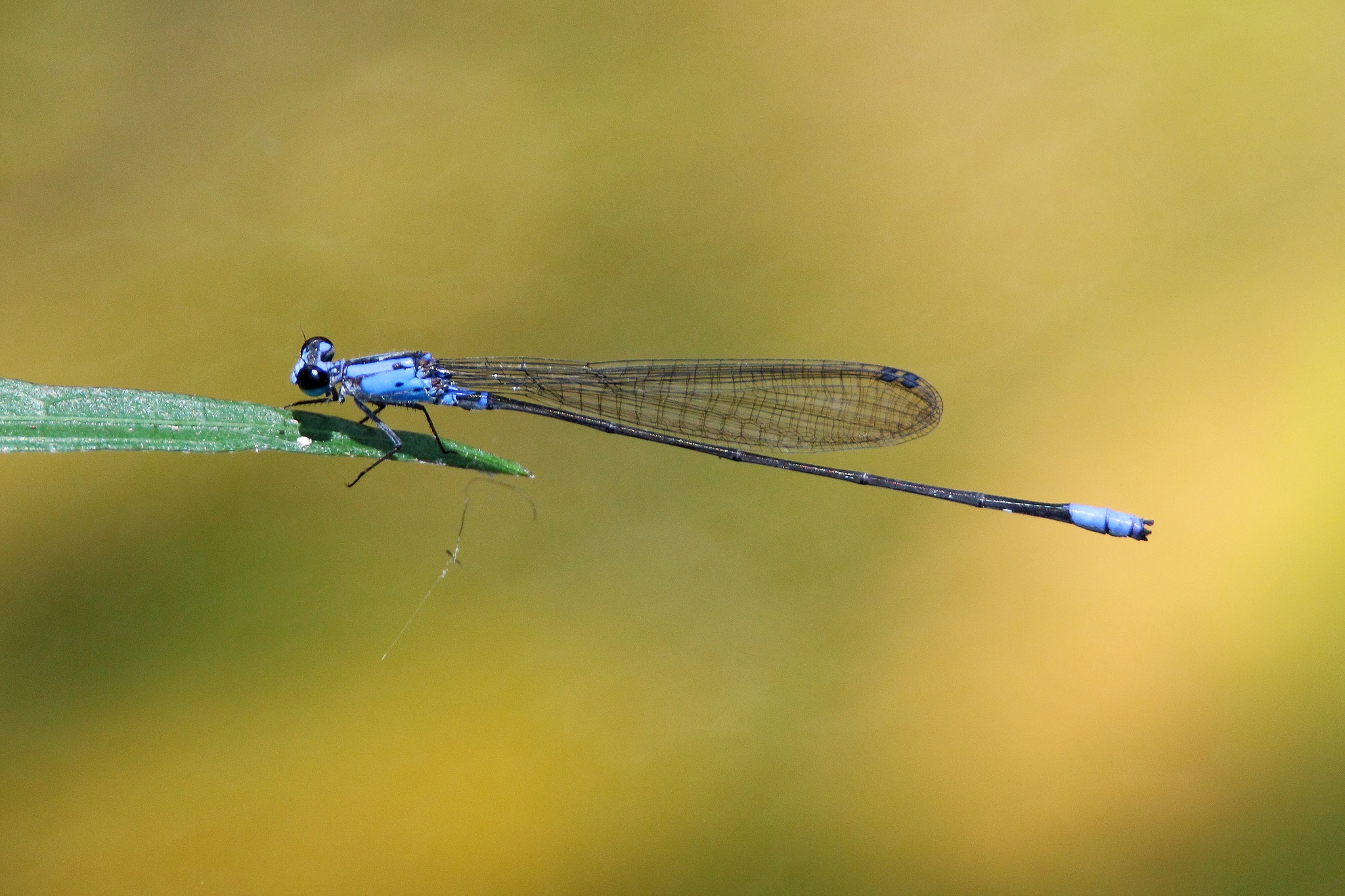
Male

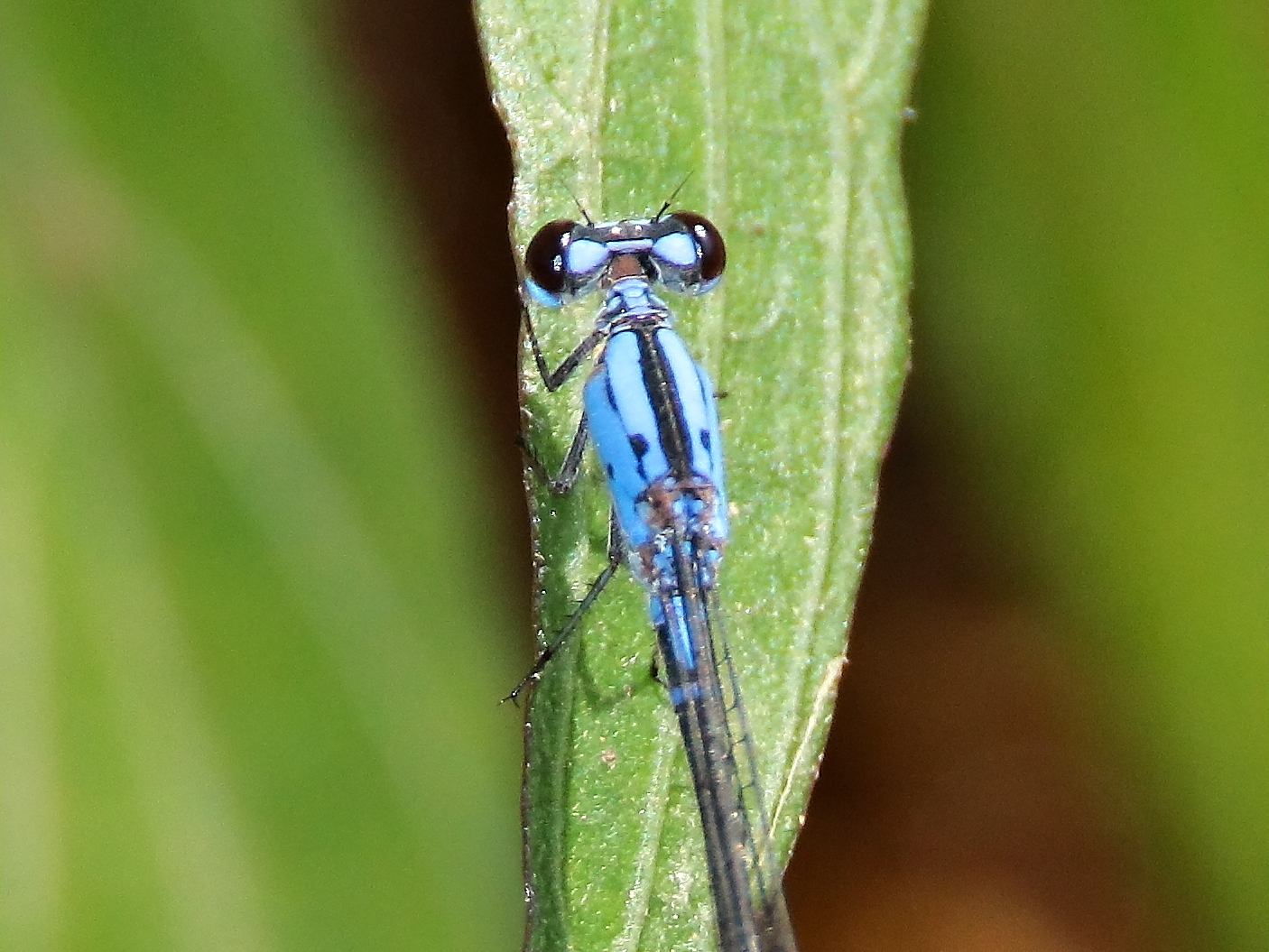
Male

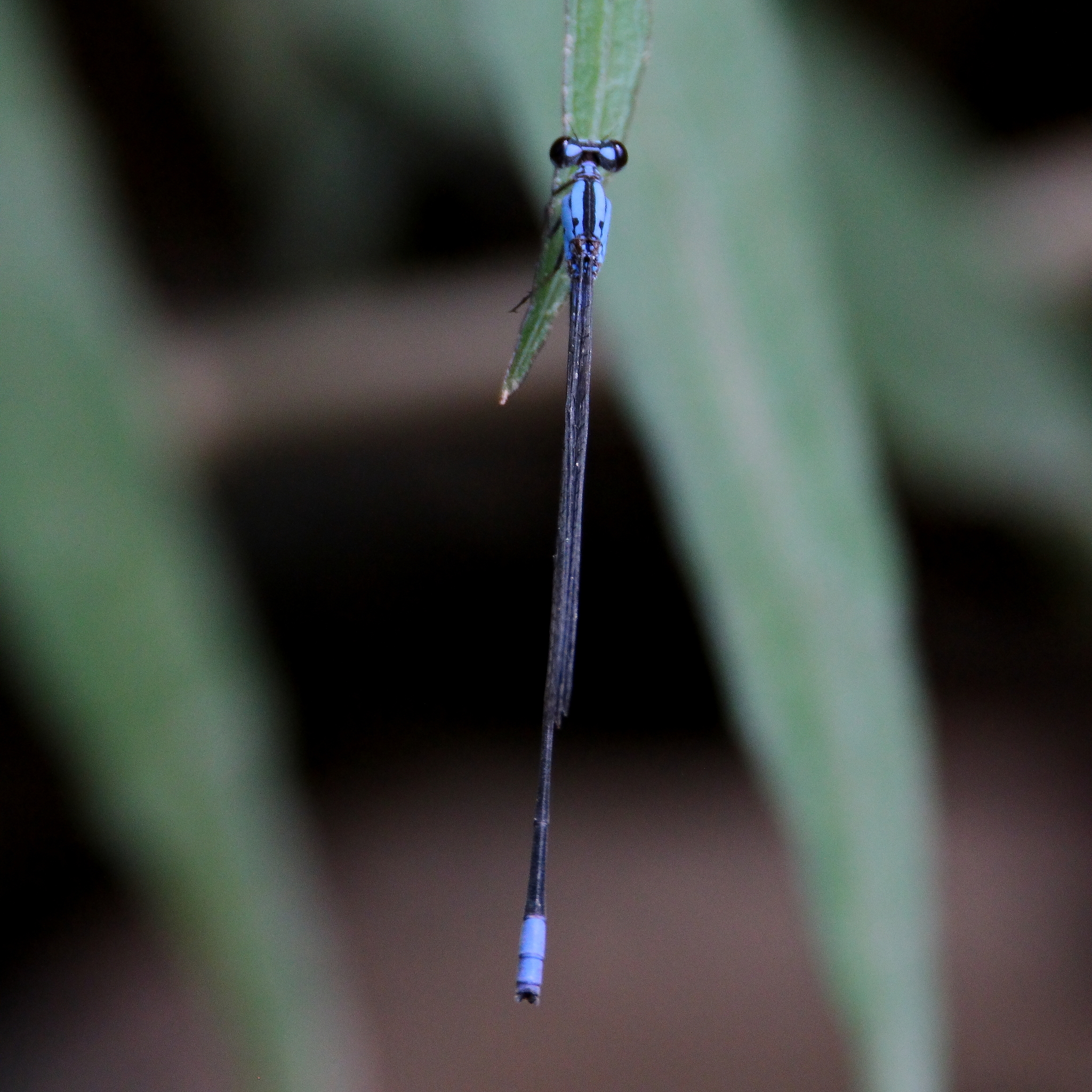
Male

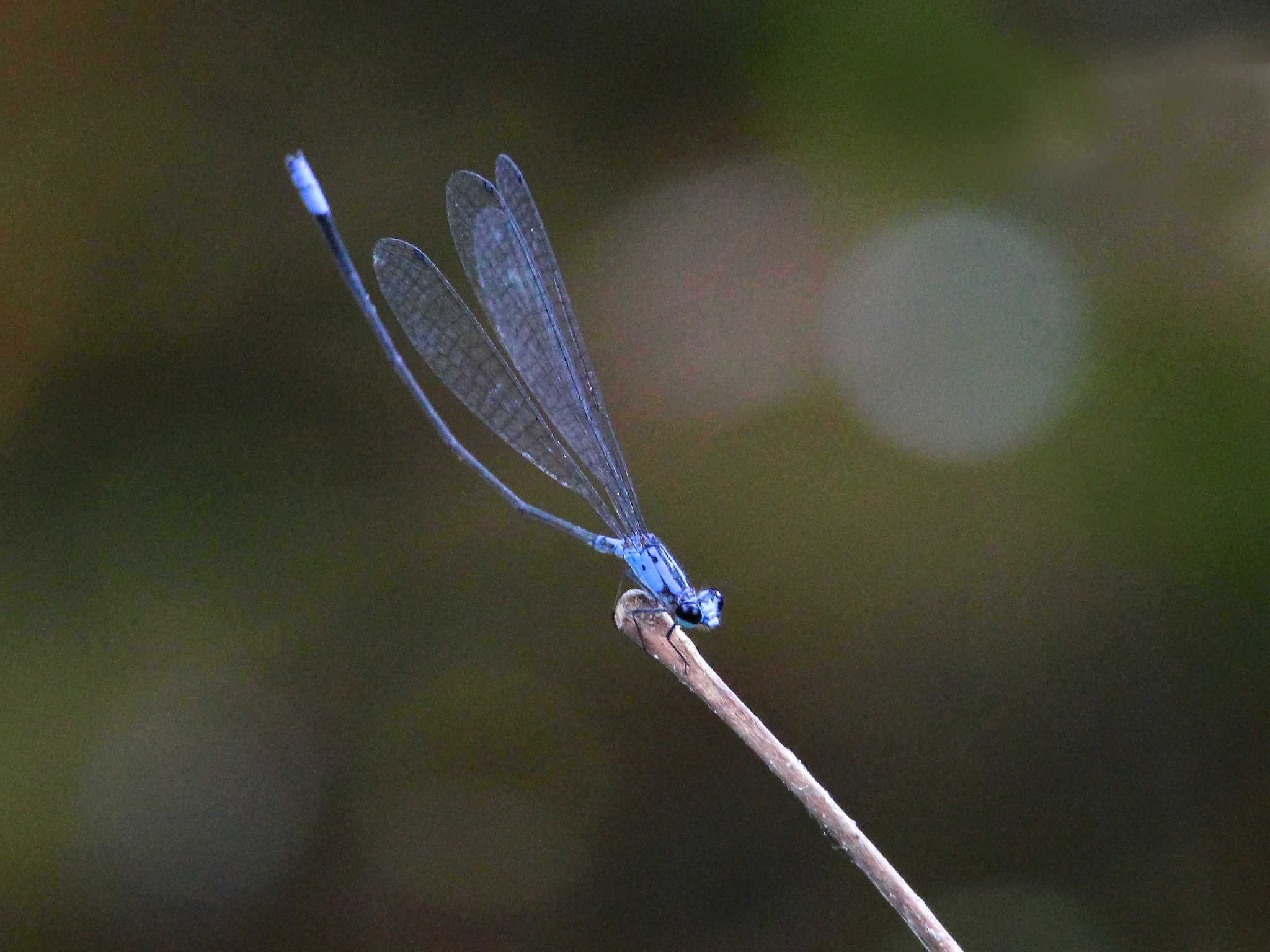
Male

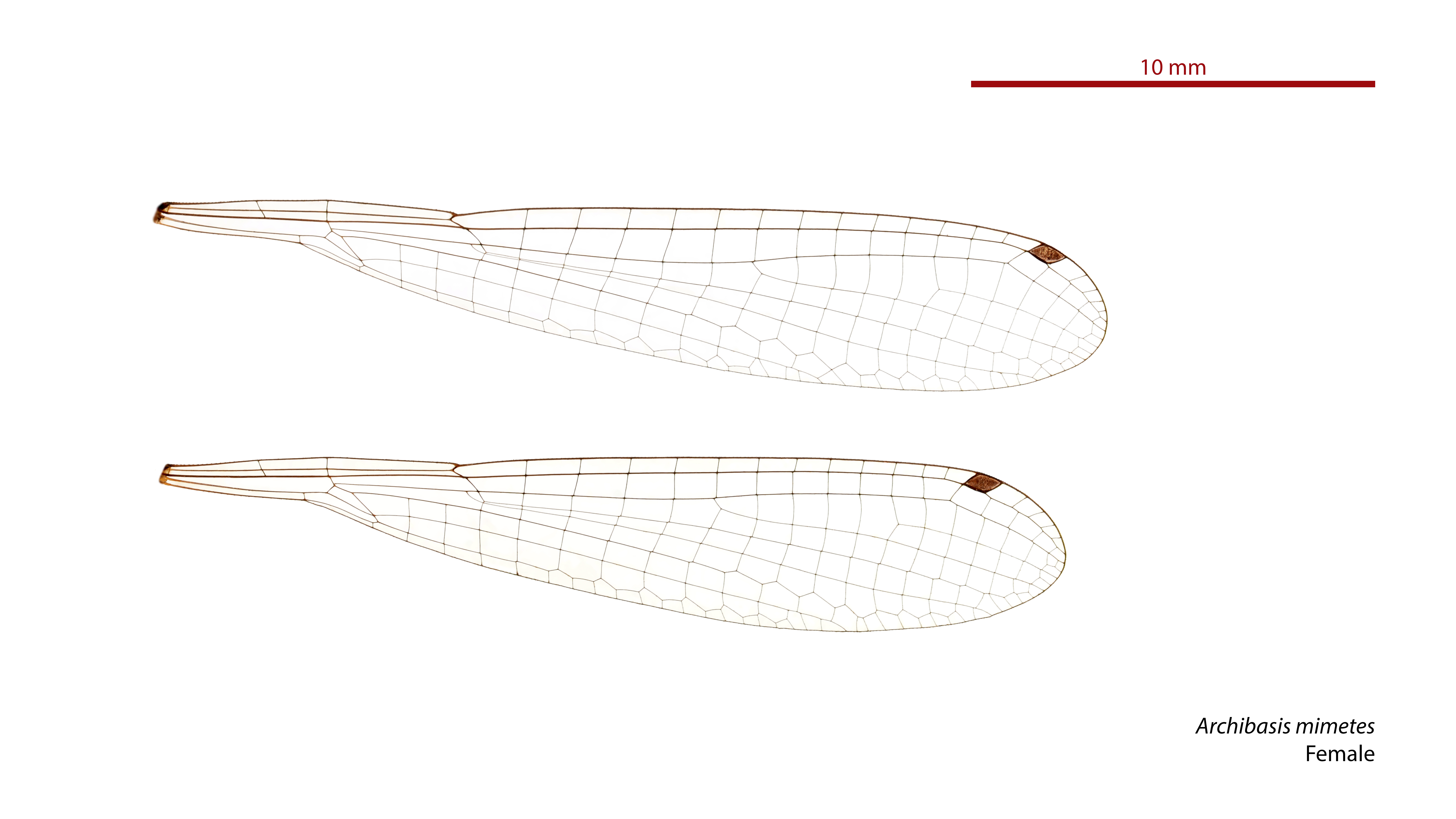
Female wings

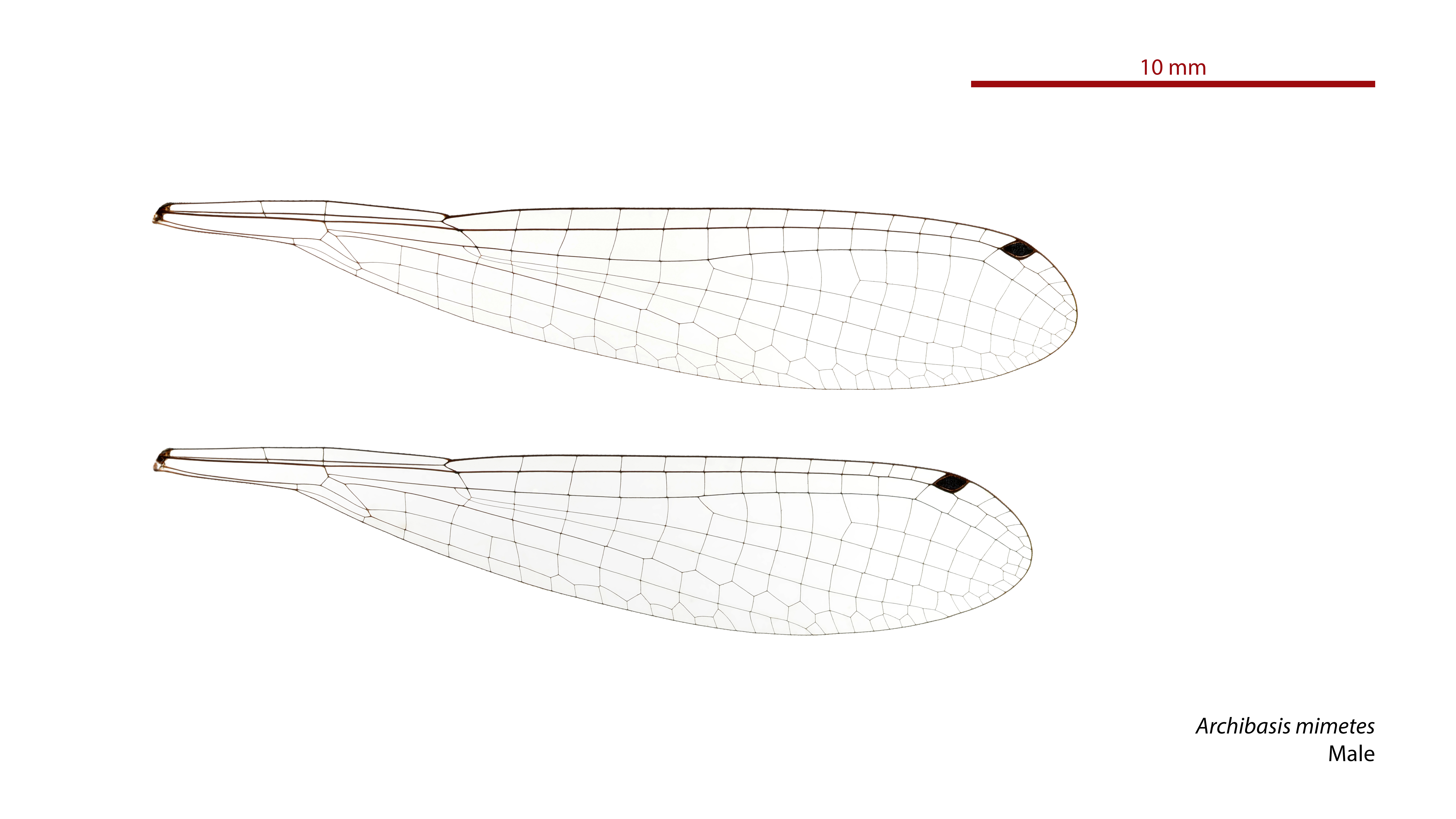
Male wings

== See also ==
- List of Odonata species of Australia
