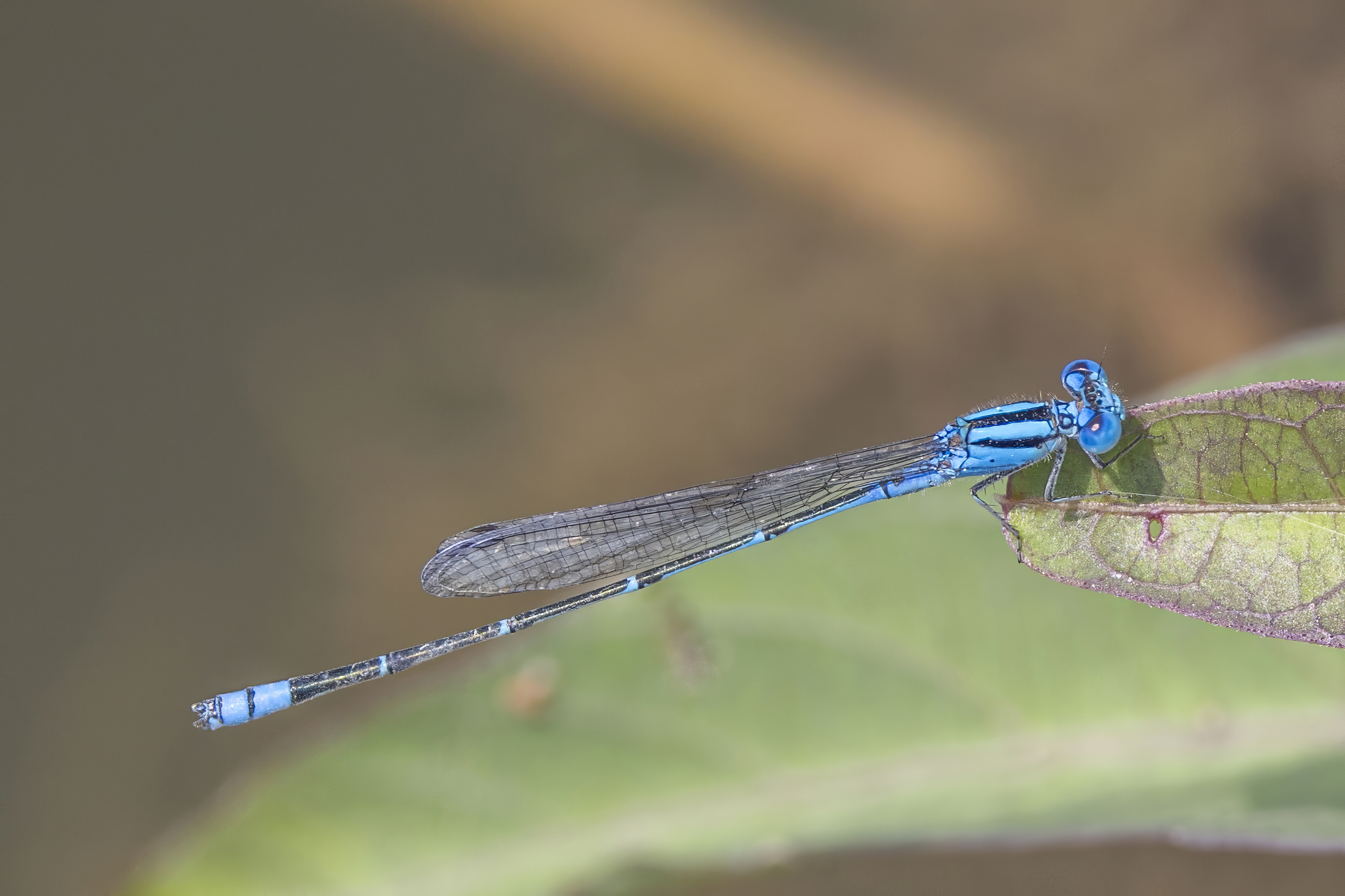
- Male
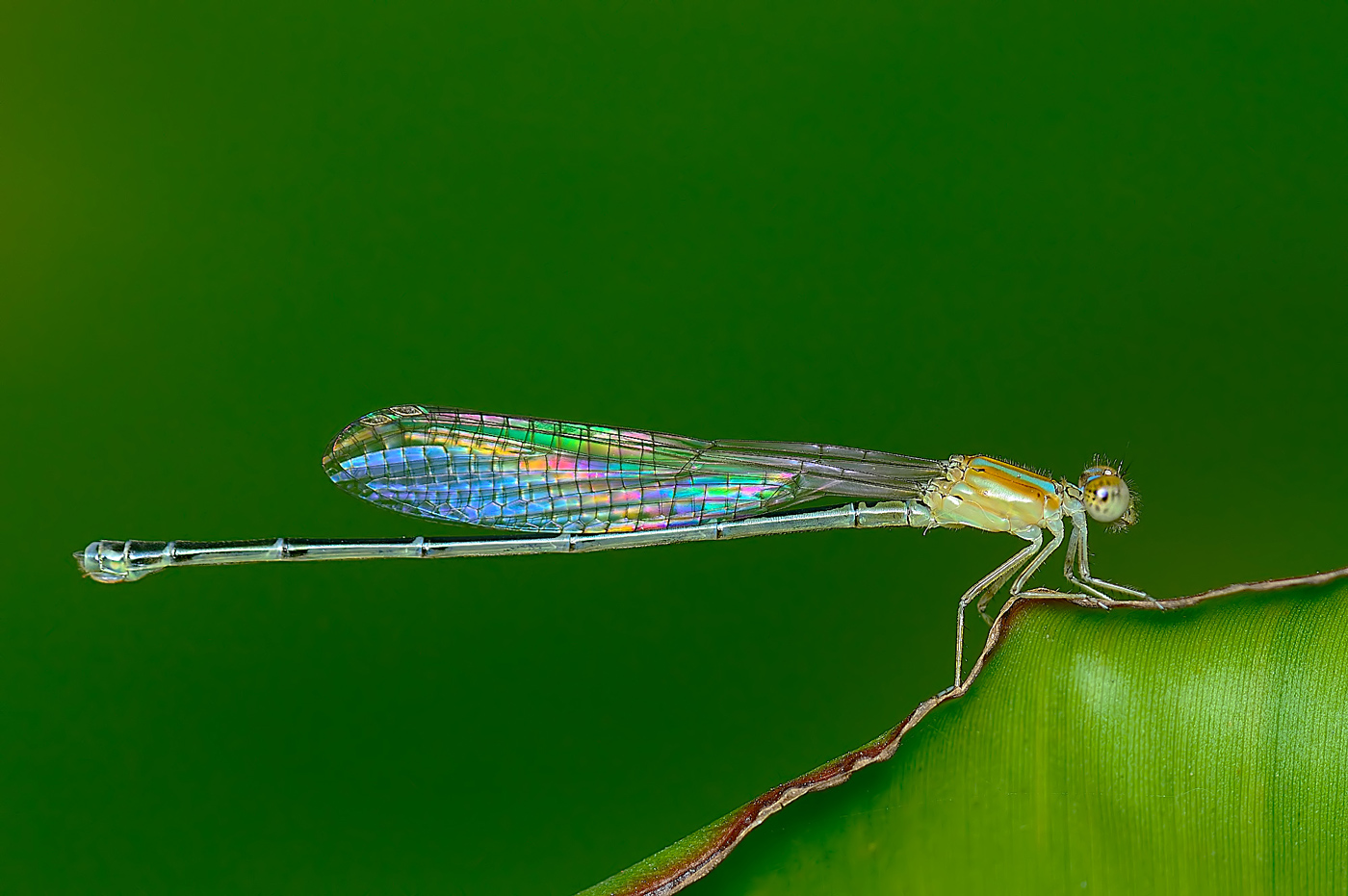
- Female

Conservation status
- Least Concern (IUCN 3.1)

Scientific classification
- Kingdom: Animalia
- Phylum: Arthropoda
- Clade: Pancrustacea
- Class: Insecta
- Order: Odonata
- Suborder: Zygoptera
- Family: Coenagrionidae
- Genus: Pseudagrion
- Species: P. microcephalum

Binomial name
- Pseudagrion microcephalum (Rambur, 1842)

Synonyms
- Agrion microcephalum Rambur, 1842

= Blue riverdamsel =

Species of damselfly

The blue riverdamsel, Pseudagrion microcephalum is a common species of damselfly in the family Coenagrionidae. It is also known as the blue sprite and blue grass dart.

== Taxonomic history ==
For many years, Pseudagrion microcephalum was considered to be a widespread species occurring across southern and eastern Asia, Australasia and the Pacific.

In 2026, Malte Seehausen and Milen Marinov reviewed the Pseudagrion microcephalum species complex and restricted Pseudagrion microcephalum to populations from the Indian subcontinent and Sri Lanka.

As part of this revision, Australian, Papuan and Pacific populations previously identified as Pseudagrion microcephalum were reassigned to several distinct species, including Pseudagrion crenatum in Australia and New Guinea. Other populations from Southeast Asia and the western Pacific were also reassigned to newly recognised regional species.

== Distribution ==
This species can be found in India and Sri Lanka.

== Description ==
It is a medium-sized damselfly with pale blue eyes, dark on top. They grow to 38 mm in length. Its thorax is azure blue with black, broad dorsal stripes and narrow humeral stripes. Abdominal segments 1 and 2 are blue with black marks on the dorsum. Mark on segment 2 looks like a chalice or thistle-head. Segments 3 to 7 are black on the dorsum and blue on the sides. Segments 8 and 9 are blue, with 8 with a thick and 9 with a thin black apical annulus. Segment 10 is black on the dorsum and blue on the sides. Superior anal appendages are of the same length as segment 10, black, and divided at the apices.

The eyes and thorax of the female are bluish green, suffused with orange, marked as in the male; but black is replaced by orange. The color of the abdomen is similar to the male but paler. Segments 8 and 9 are also black with fine apical blue rings. Segment 10 is pale blue.

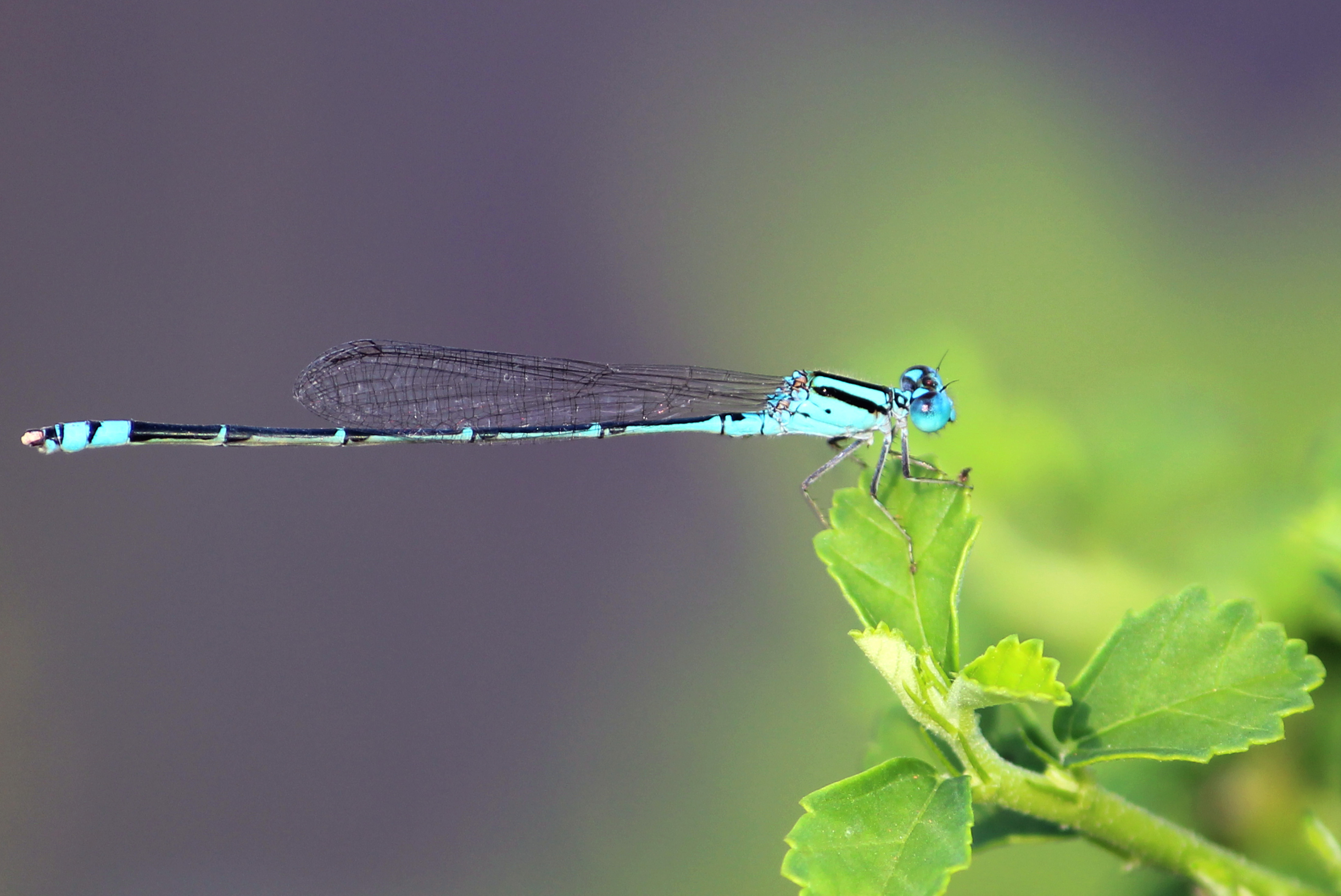
Male

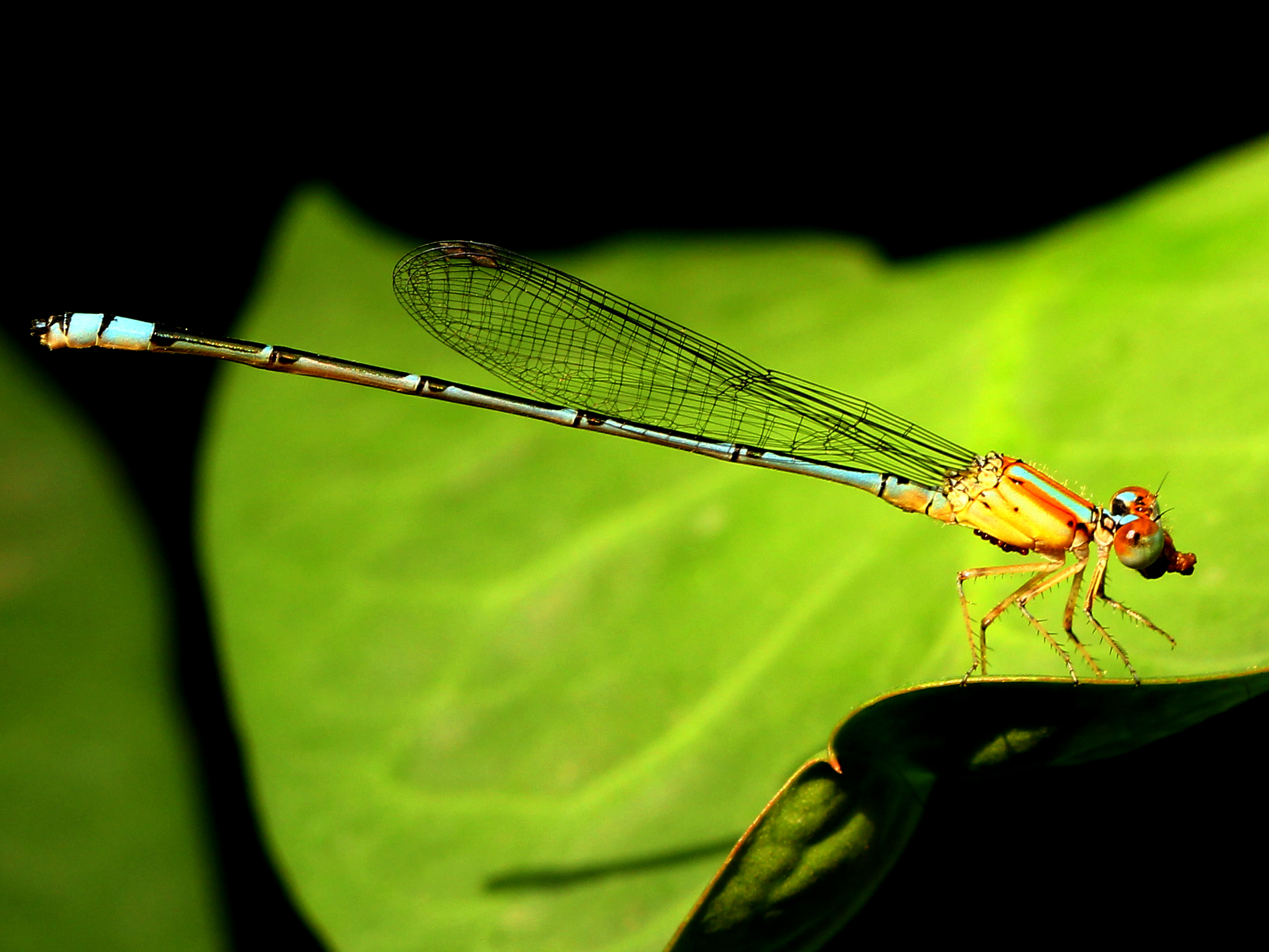
Young male

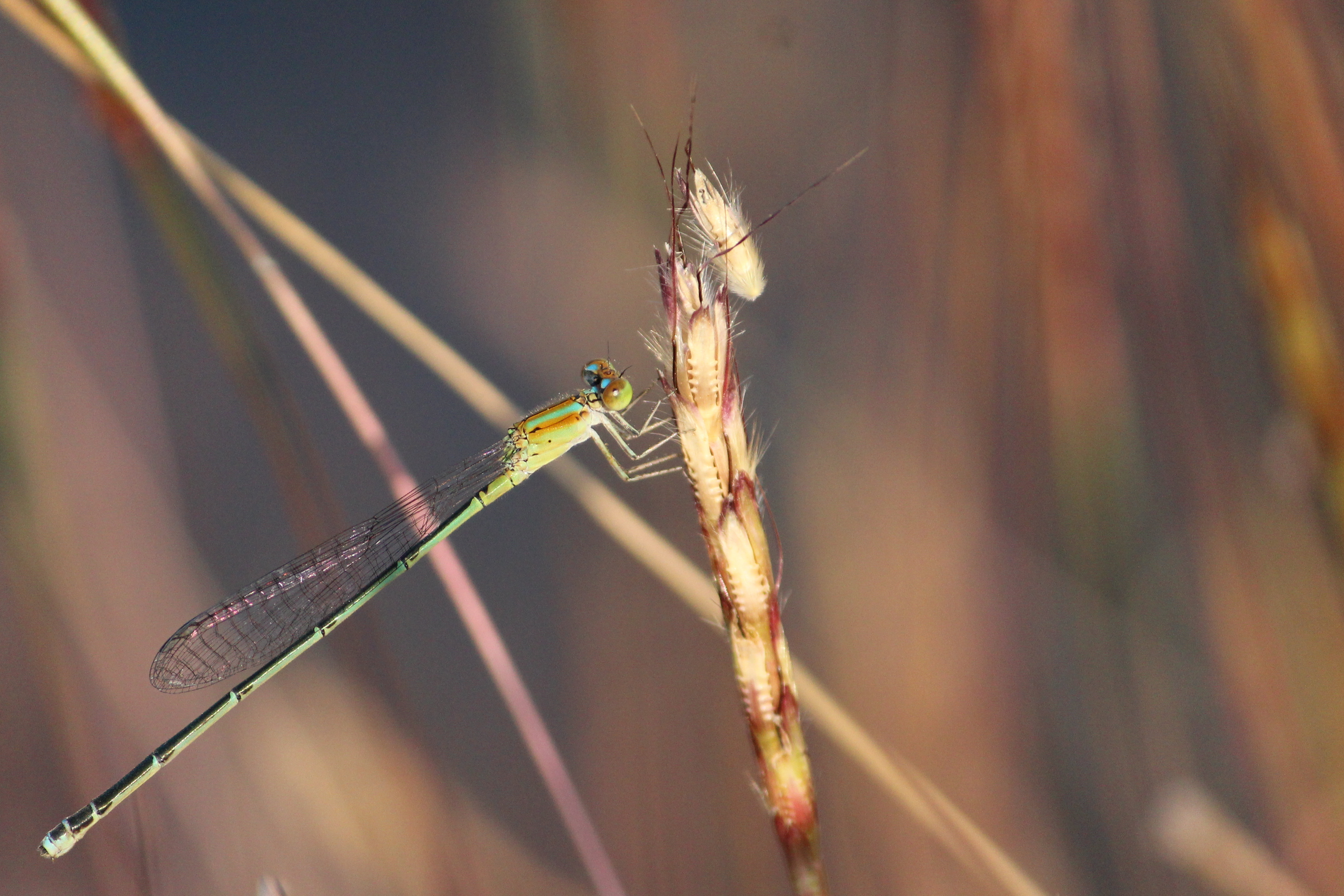
Female

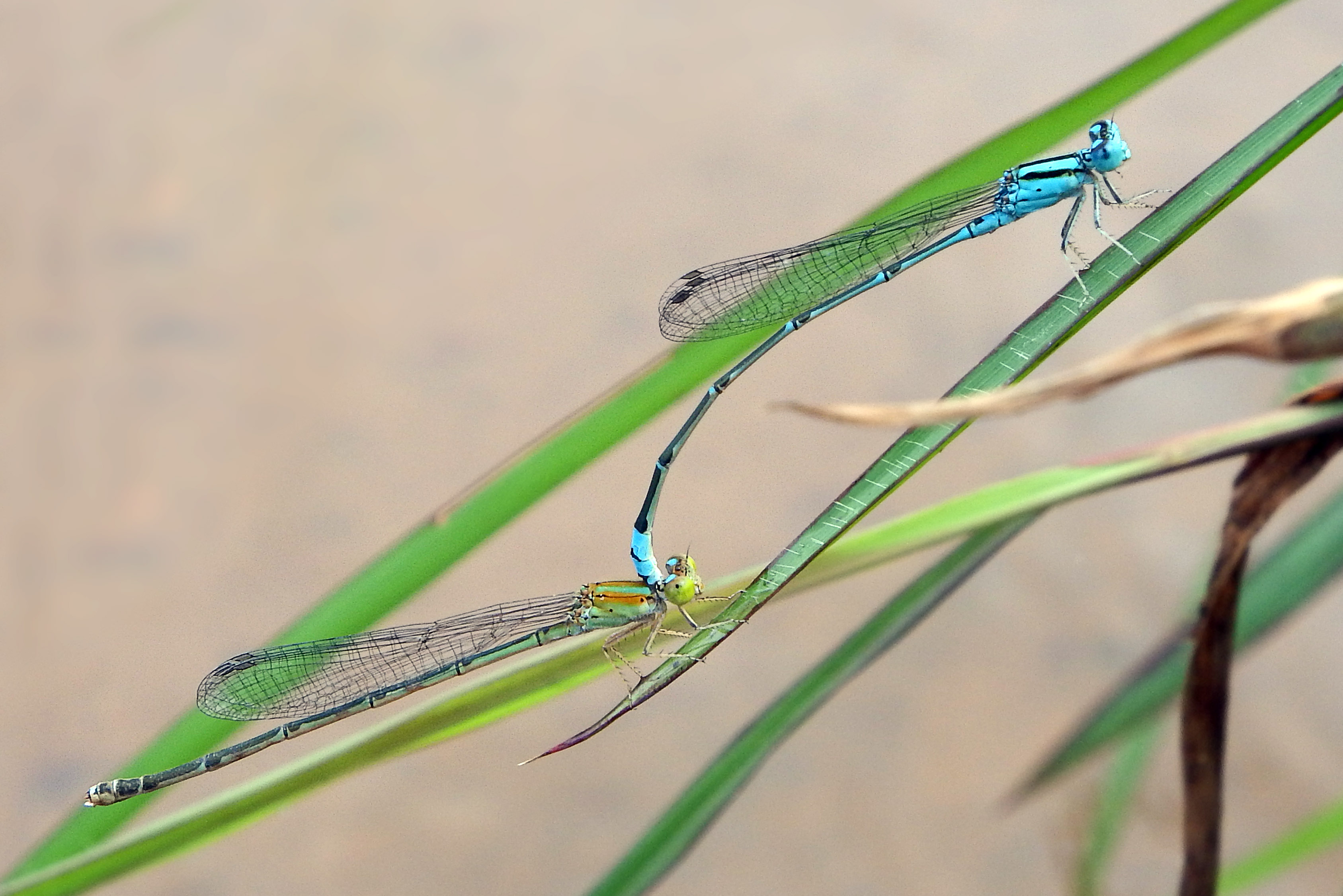
Tandem pair

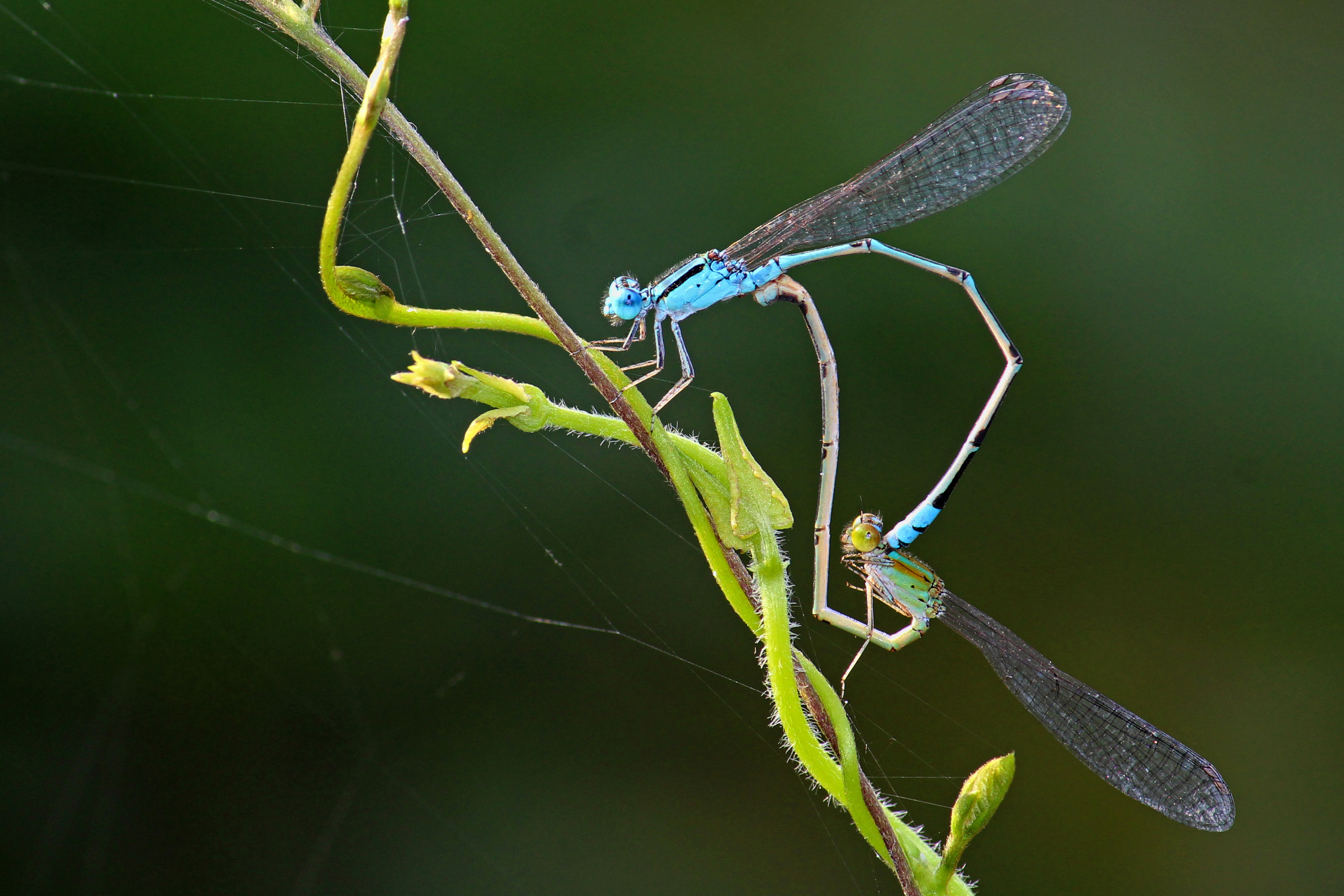
Mating pair

== Habitat ==
This species can easily be found near running water or still water. They usually rest on the plants, either in the middle of ponds or at the water edges. It breeds in ponds, lakes, and streams. It is entirely a species of the plains, being replaced by Pseudagrion malabaricum in the neighboring hills of the Western Ghats of India and Sri Lanka and by Pseudagrion australasiae to the northeast of India and Burma.

== Etymology ==
The genus name Pseudagrion is derived from the Greek ψευδής (pseudēs, "false" or "not true"), combined with Agrion, a genus name derived from the Greek ἄγριος (agrios, "wild"). Agrion was the name given in 1775 by Johan Christian Fabricius for all damselflies.

The species name microcephalum is derived from the Greek μικρός (mikros, "small") and κεφαλή (kephalē, "head"), referring to its relatively small head compared with other species.

== See also ==
- List of odonates of India
- List of odonata of Kerala
