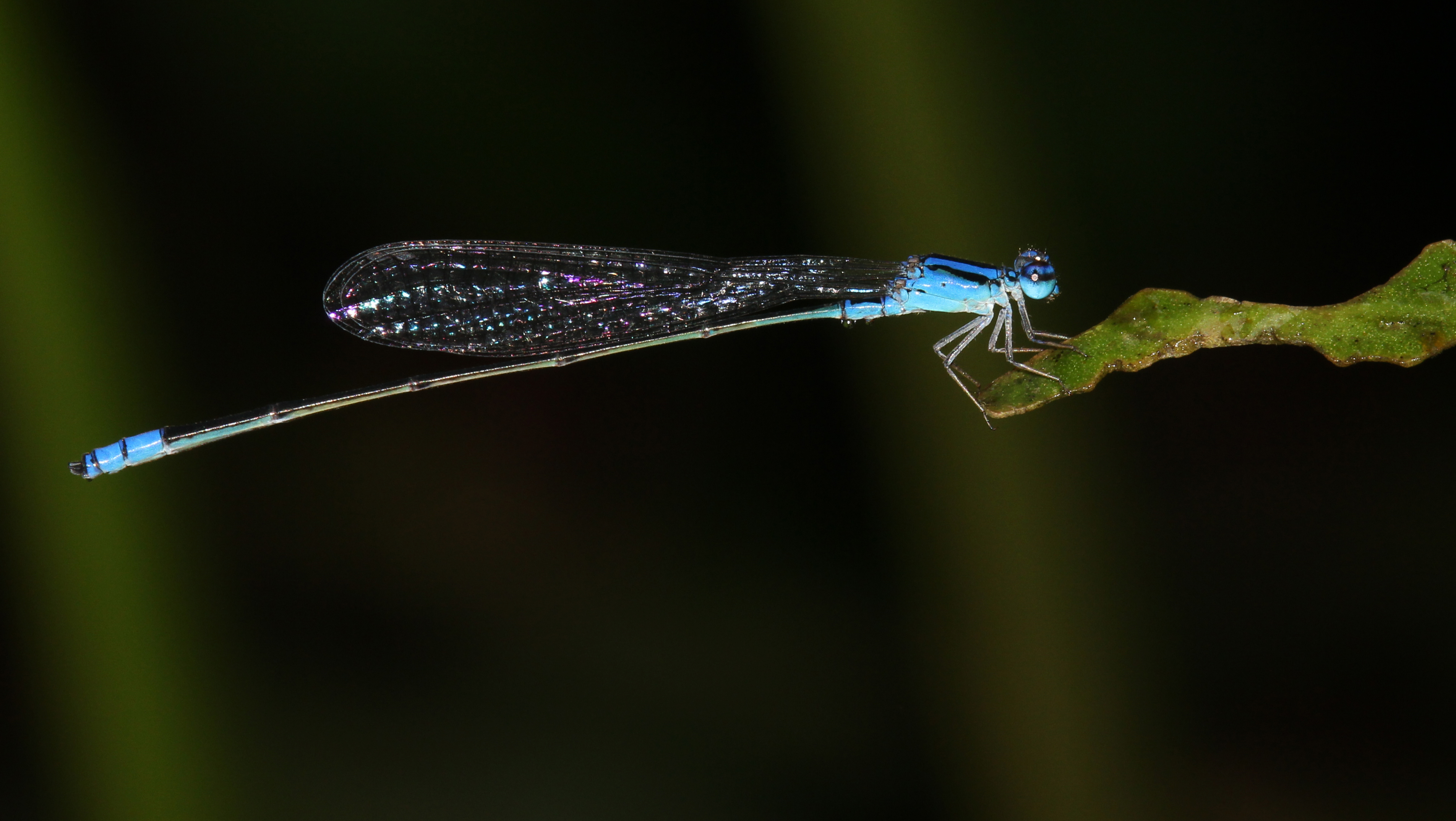
- Archibasis lieftincki Sri Lanka

Scientific classification
- Kingdom: Animalia
- Phylum: Arthropoda
- Clade: Pancrustacea
- Class: Insecta
- Order: Odonata
- Suborder: Zygoptera
- Family: Coenagrionidae
- Genus: Archibasis; Kirby, 1890
- Probable distribution of Archibasis

= Archibasis =

Genus of damselflies

Archibasis is a genus of damselflies belonging to the family Coenagrionidae. These damselflies are generally medium-sized with bright colouring. Archibasis occurs in southern Asia, Indonesia, New Guinea and Australia.

== Species ==
The genus Archibasis includes the following species:

- Archibasis crucigera Lieftinck, 1949
- Archibasis incisura Lieftinck, 1949
- Archibasis lieftincki Conniff & Bedjacnic, 2013
- Archibasis melanocyana (Selys, 1877)
- Archibasis mimetes (Tillyard, 1913)
- Archibasis oscillans (Selys, 1877)
- Archibasis rebeccae Kemp, 1989
- Archibasis tenella Lieftinck, 1949
- Archibasis viola Lieftinck, 1949

== Etymology ==
The genus name Archibasis is derived from the Greek ἀρχή (archē, "beginning" or "origin") and βάσις (basis, "base"), referring to the distinctly narrowed base of the wings.
