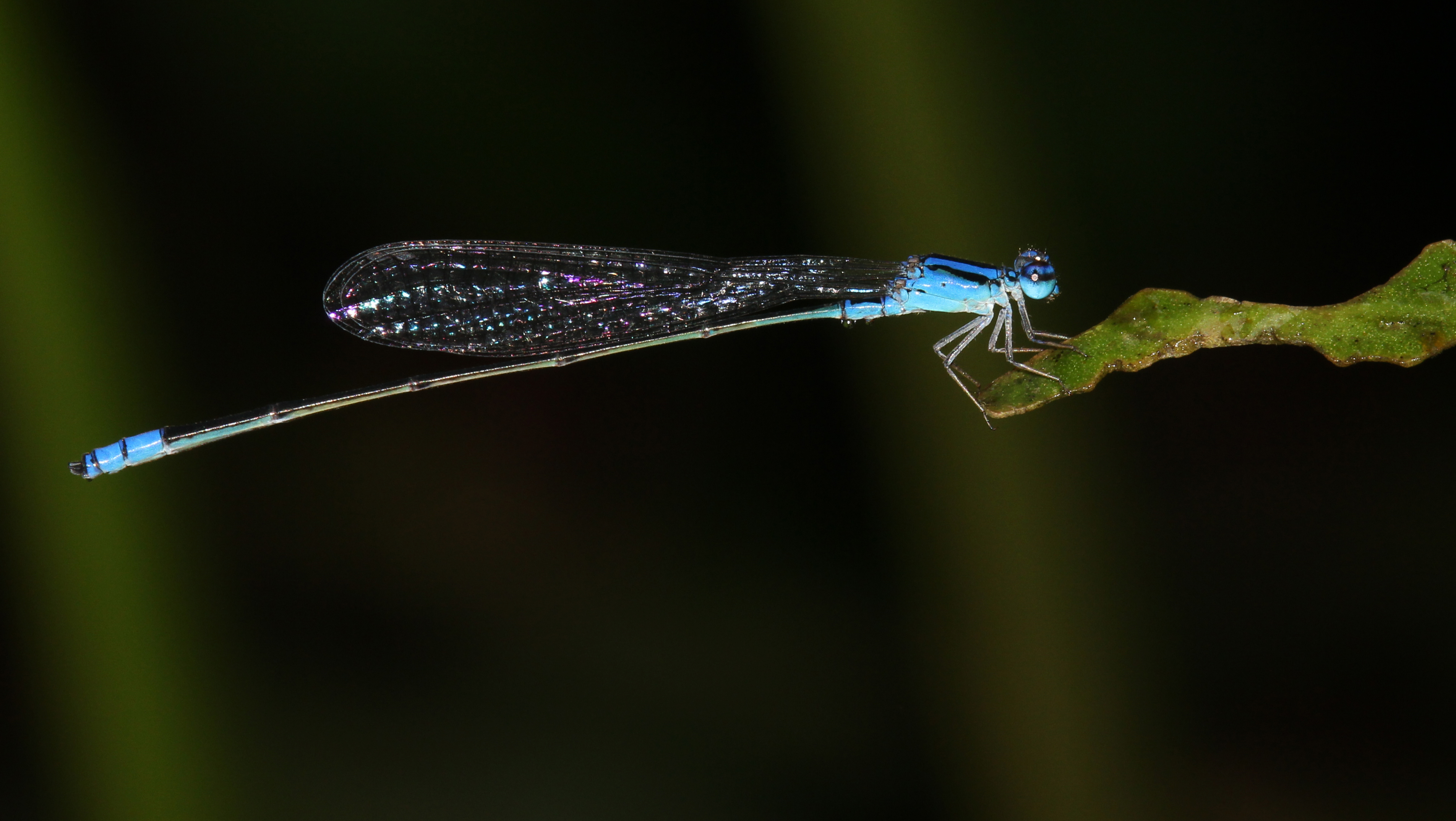

Conservation status
- Endangered (IUCN 3.1)

Scientific classification
- Kingdom: Animalia
- Phylum: Arthropoda
- Clade: Pancrustacea
- Class: Insecta
- Order: Odonata
- Suborder: Zygoptera
- Family: Coenagrionidae
- Genus: Archibasis
- Species: A. lieftincki

Binomial name
- Archibasis lieftincki Coniff & Bedjanic, 2013

= Archibasis lieftincki =

Species of damselfly

Archibasis lieftincki is a species of damselfly in the family Coenagrionidae. It is endemic to Sri Lanka.
