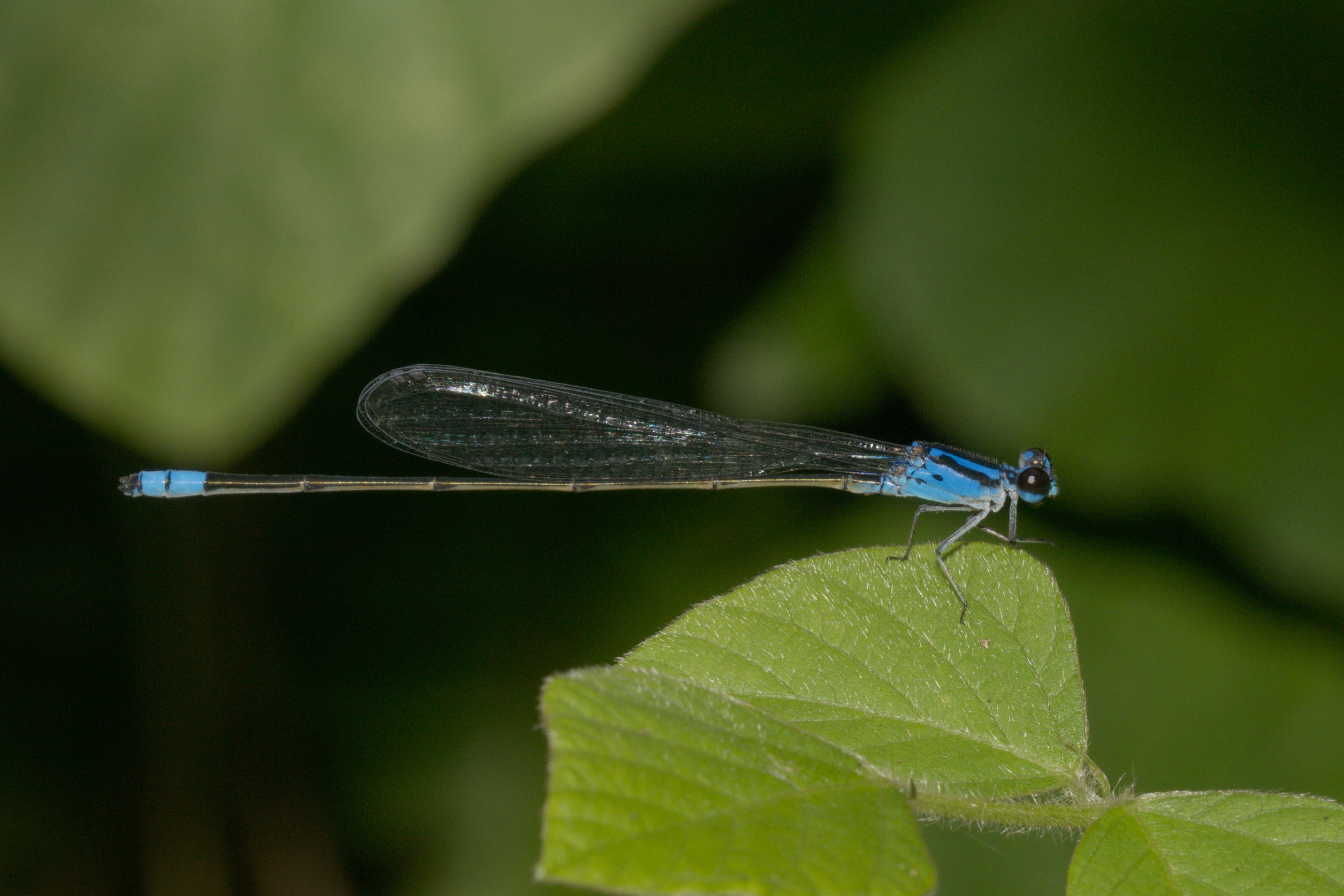
- Male, Kadavoor, Kerala

Conservation status
- Least Concern (IUCN 3.1)

Scientific classification
- Kingdom: Animalia
- Phylum: Arthropoda
- Class: Insecta
- Order: Odonata
- Suborder: Zygoptera
- Family: Coenagrionidae
- Genus: Archibasis
- Species: A. oscillans

Binomial name
- Archibasis oscillans (Sélys, 1877)

Synonyms
- Pseudagrion praeclarum Fraser, 1924; Archibasis mimetes praeclara Fraser, 1933; Stenobasis oscillans Selys, 1877; Archibasis oscillans hanwellanensis Conniff & Bedjanic, 2013

= Archibasis oscillans =

Species of damselfly

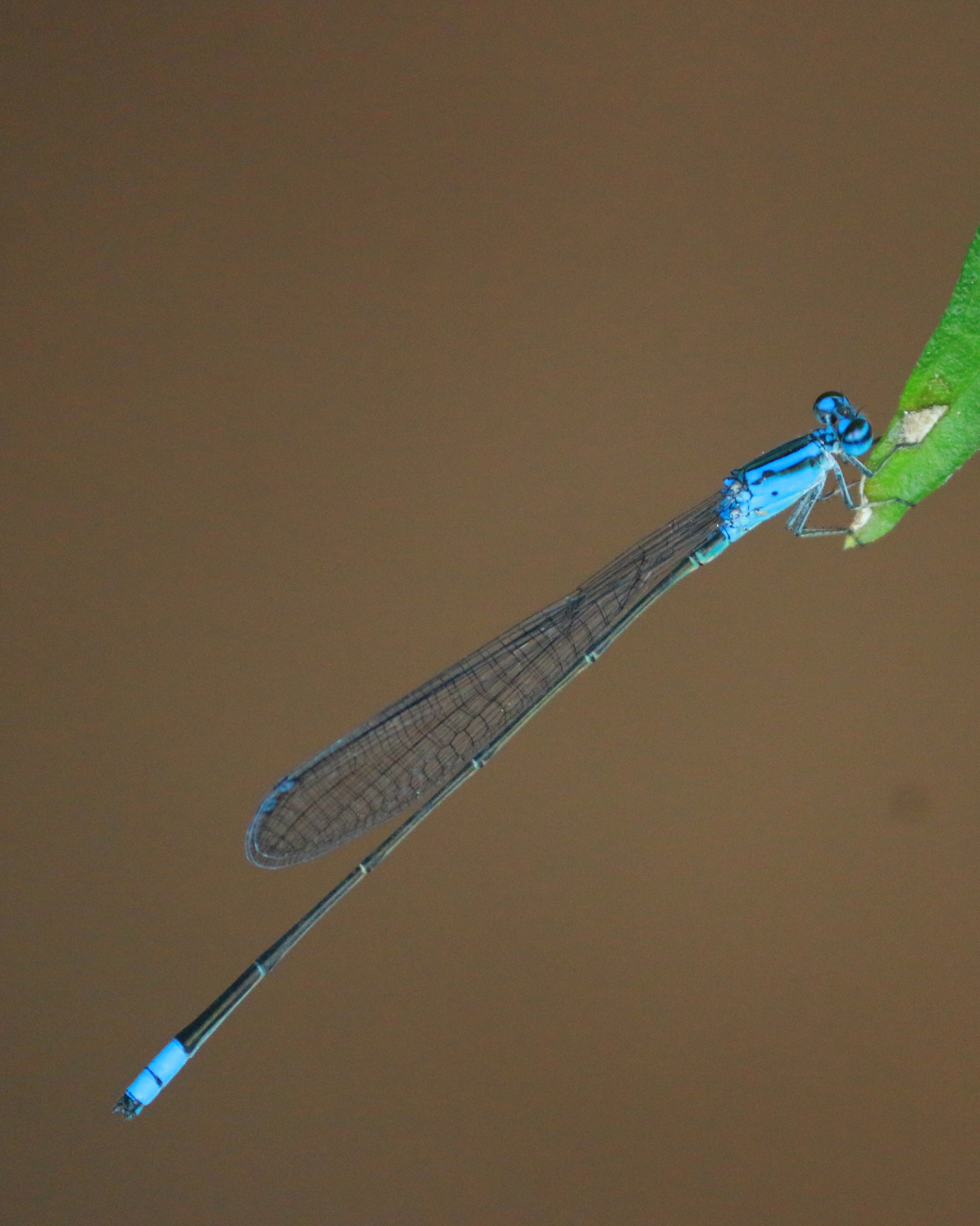
Archibasis oscillans, long-banded bluetail

Archibasis oscillans, long-banded bluetail, is a species of damselfly in family Coenagrionidae. It is found from India, Thailand, Laos, and Indonesia.

== Description and habitat ==
It is slender and long damselfly with blue capped light blue eyes. Its thorax is black with azure blue antehumeral stripes followed by blue on lateral sides. Abdomen is black on dorsum and greenish yellow on the ventral half of the lateral sides up to segment 7. Remaining segments are azure blue with apical black rings. Female is similar to the male; though a bit robust and paler in colors.

It breeds in lowland forest streams and rivers.

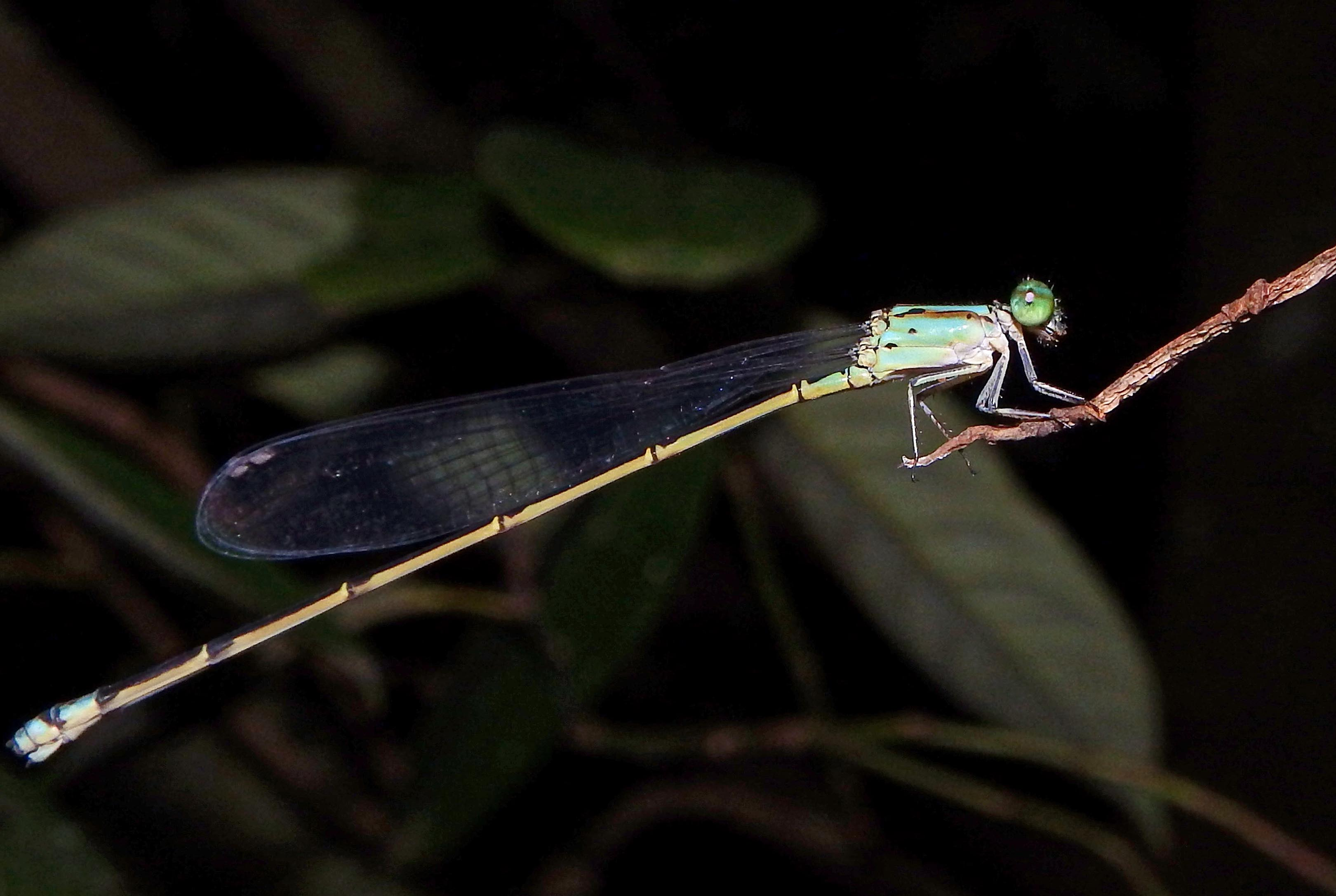
Female

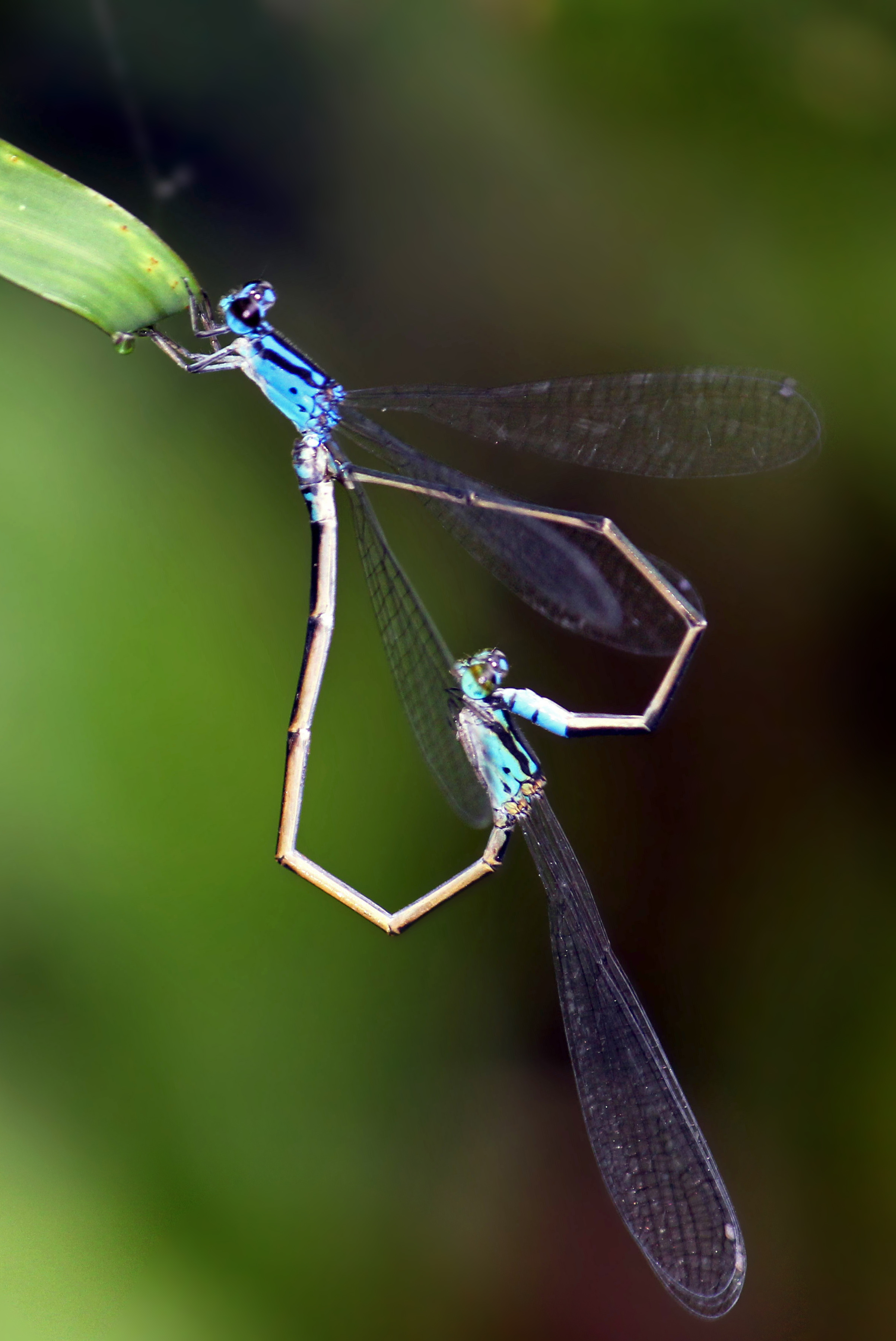
Mating

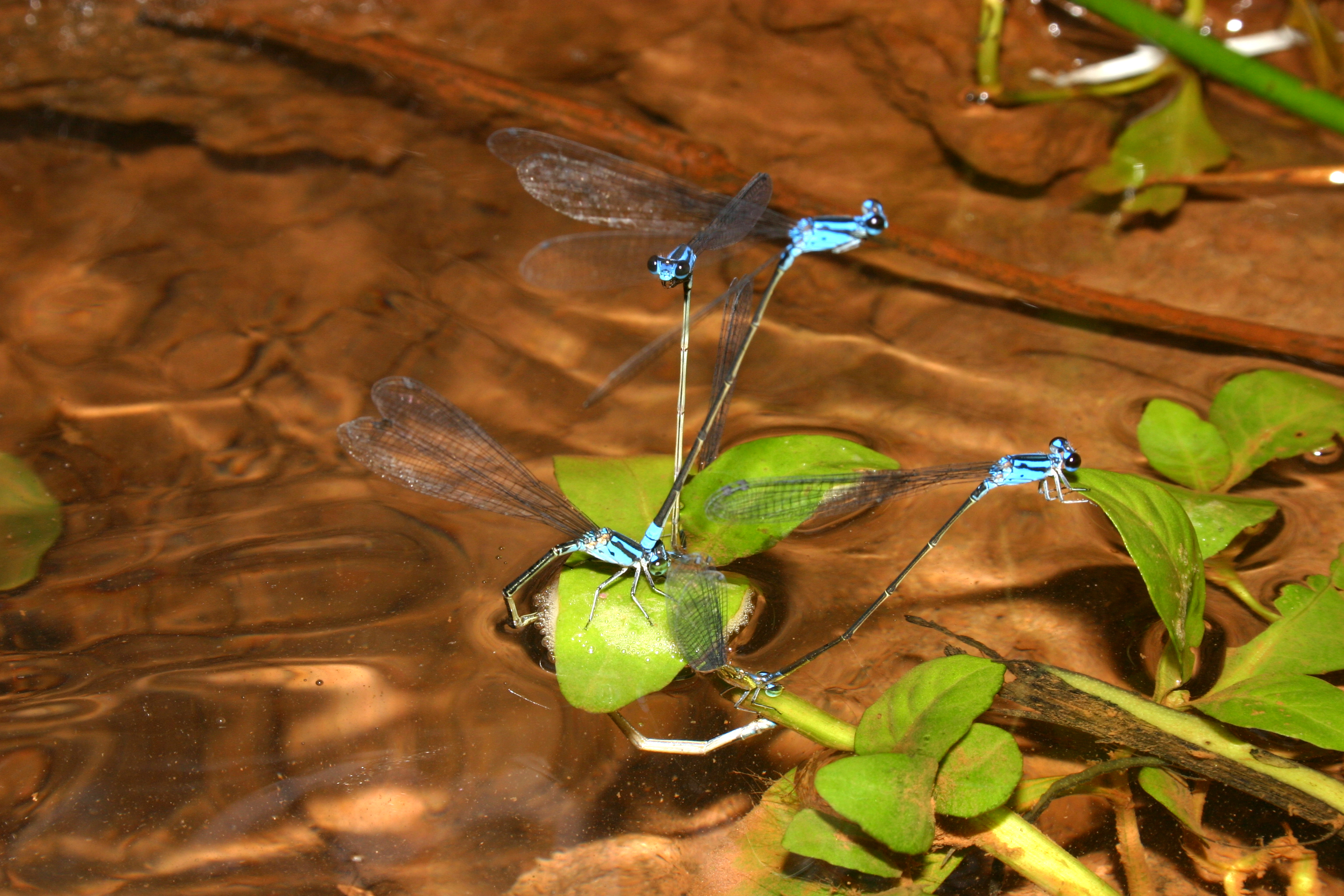
Ovipositing

== See also ==
- List of odonates of India
- List of odonata of Kerala
