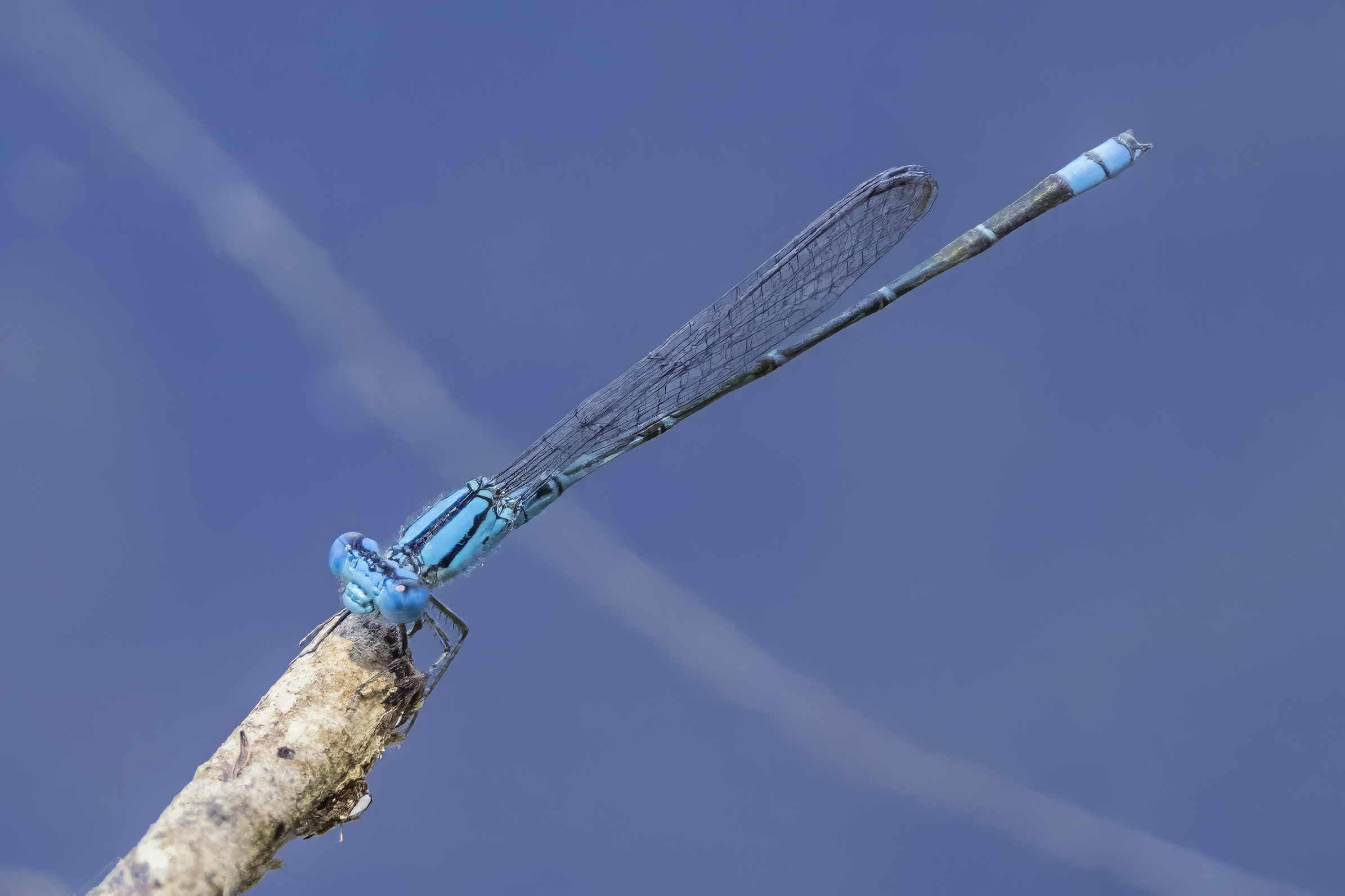
- Male
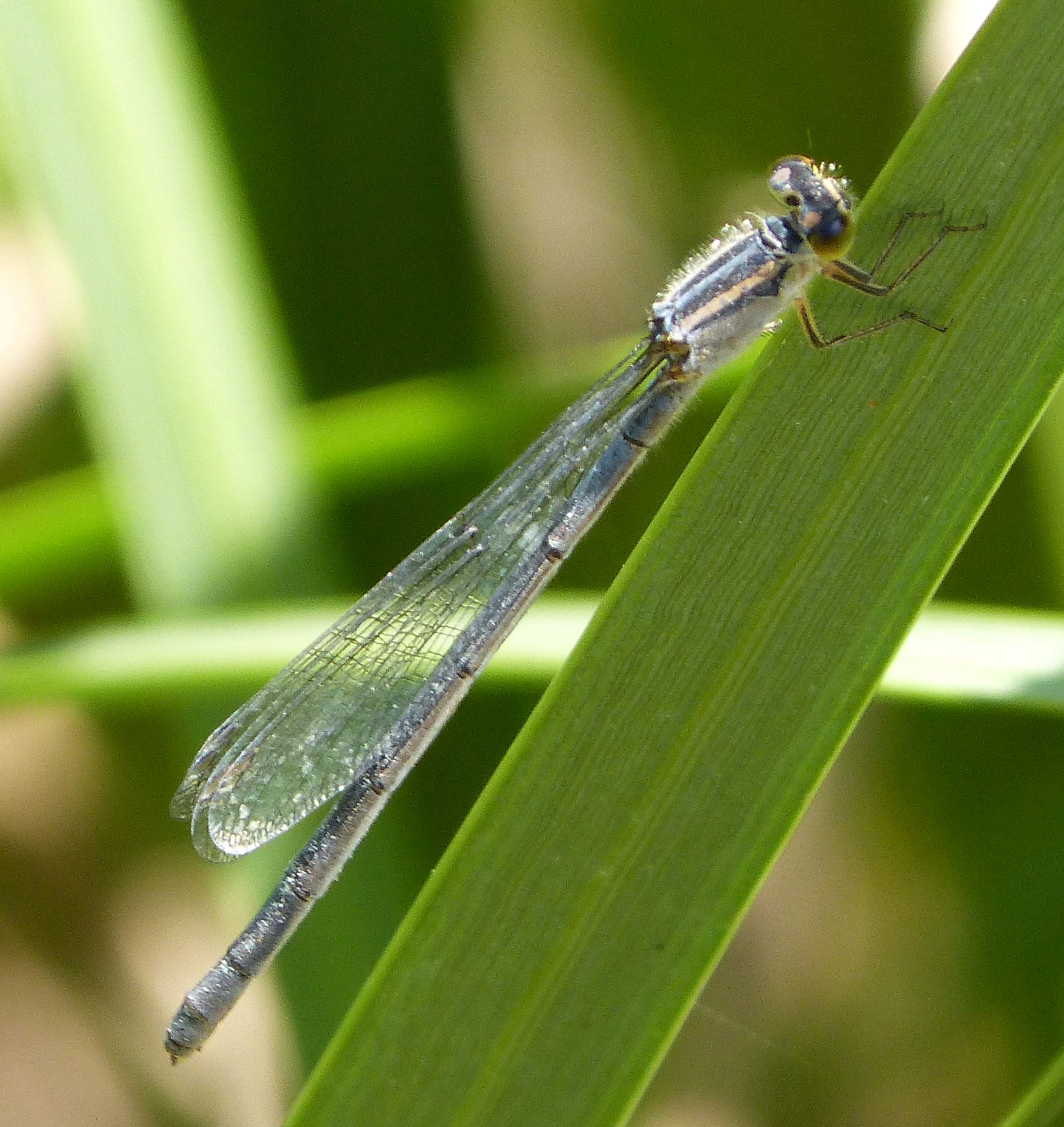
- Female

Scientific classification
- Kingdom: Animalia
- Phylum: Arthropoda
- Clade: Pancrustacea
- Class: Insecta
- Order: Odonata
- Suborder: Zygoptera
- Family: Coenagrionidae
- Genus: Pseudagrion
- Species: P. crenatum

Binomial name
- Pseudagrion crenatum Seehausen & Marinov, 2026

= Pseudagrion crenatum =

Species of damselfly

Pseudagrion crenatum is a species of damselfly in the family Coenagrionidae. In Australia this species is commonly known as a blue riverdamsel.

The species occurs in northern and eastern Australia, Indonesian West Papua and Papua New Guinea.

For many years Australian specimens of this species were treated as Pseudagrion microcephalum, however a 2026 revision of the Pseudagrion microcephalum complex recognised the Australian and Papuan populations as a distinct species, Pseudagrion crenatum.

== Taxonomic history ==
In 2026, Malte Seehausen and Milen Marinov described Pseudagrion crenatum as a new species during a revision of the Pseudagrion microcephalum complex. The species was separated from Pseudagrion microcephalum on the basis of differences in the male appendages.

Prior to this revision, Australian populations of this species had generally been identified as Pseudagrion microcephalum, a species then considered to be widespread across southern and eastern Asia, Australasia and the Pacific. Seehausen and Marinov restricted Pseudagrion microcephalum to the Indian subcontinent and recognised several distinct regional taxa, including Pseudagrion crenatum in Australia and New Guinea.

== Description ==
Pseudagrion crenatum is a slender blue-and-black damselfly belonging to the Pseudagrion blue-group. Males have blue markings on the head, thorax and abdomen, with black dorsal markings on the abdominal segments.

The species is distinguished from related species by the shape of the male appendages. The tips of the appendages are deeply divided when viewed from the side.

== Distribution and habitat ==
Pseudagrion crenatum occurs in northern and eastern Australia, Indonesian West Papua and Papua New Guinea. In Australia it is found mainly in tropical and subtropical regions.

Species of Pseudagrion typically inhabit streams, rivers and still waters with emergent vegetation.

== Etymology ==
The genus name Pseudagrion is derived from the Greek ψευδής (pseudēs, "false" or "not true"), combined with Agrion, a genus name derived from the Greek ἄγριος (agrios, "wild"). Agrion was the name given in 1775 by Johan Christian Fabricius for all damselflies.

The species name crenatum is derived from the Latin crenatus ("notched" or "scalloped"), referring to the deeply divided tips of the male appendages.

== Gallery ==
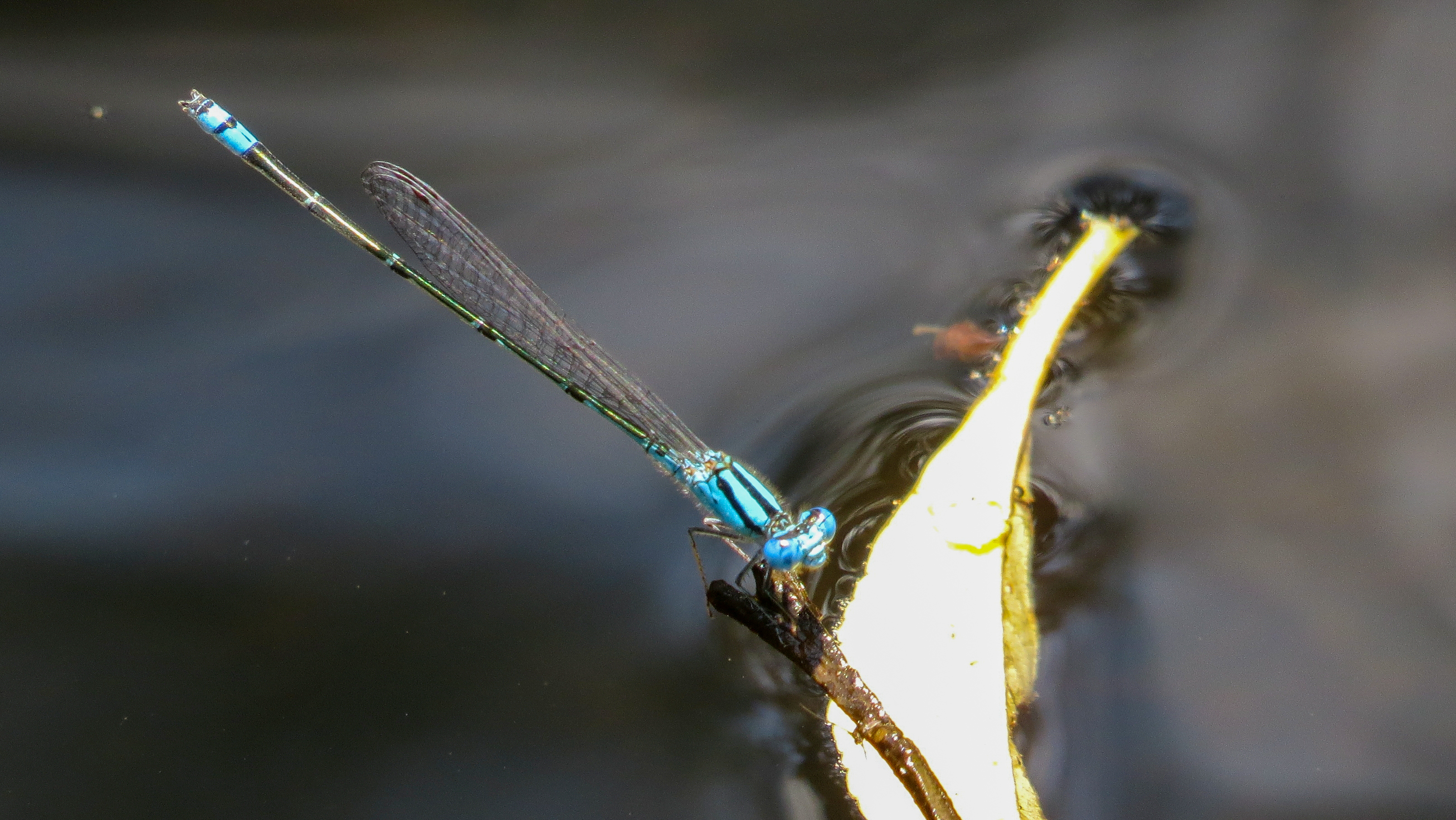
Male

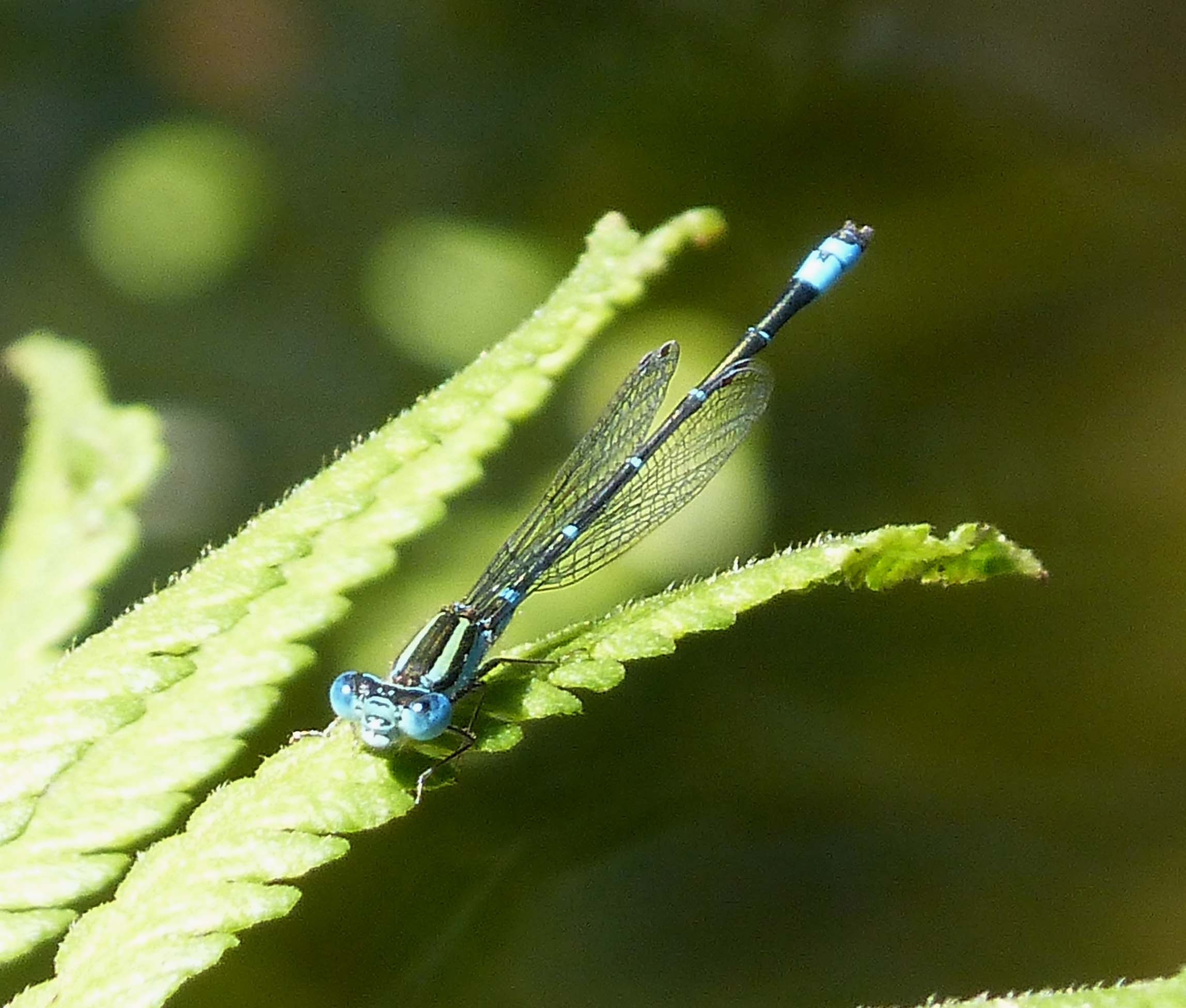
Male

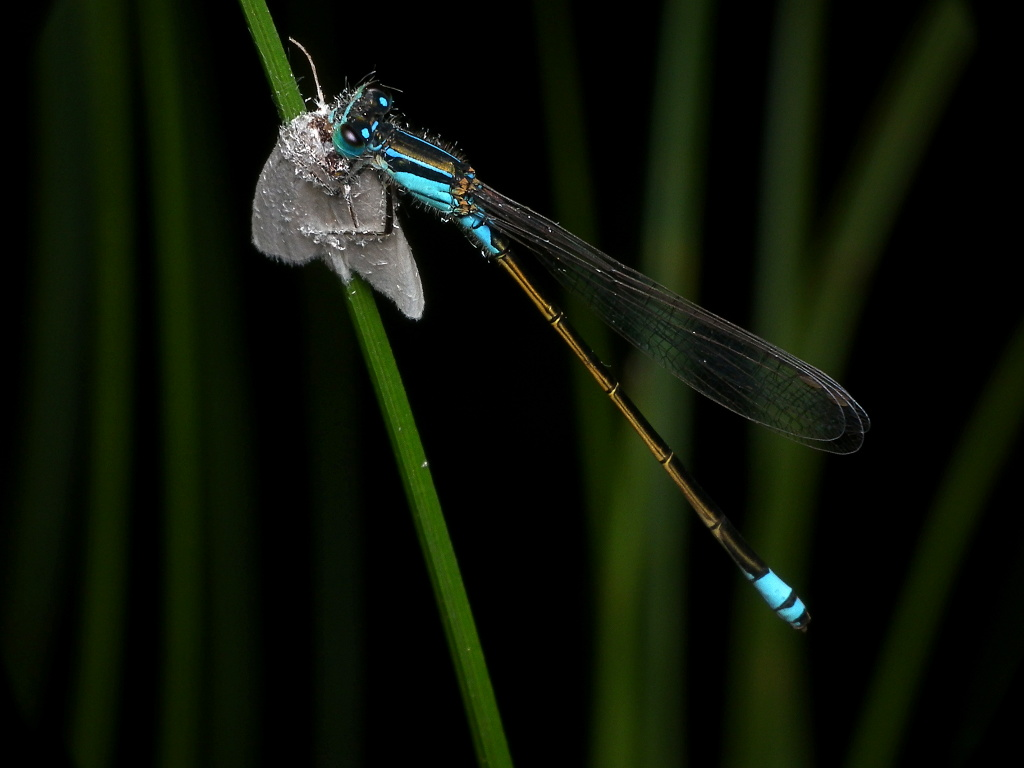
With prey

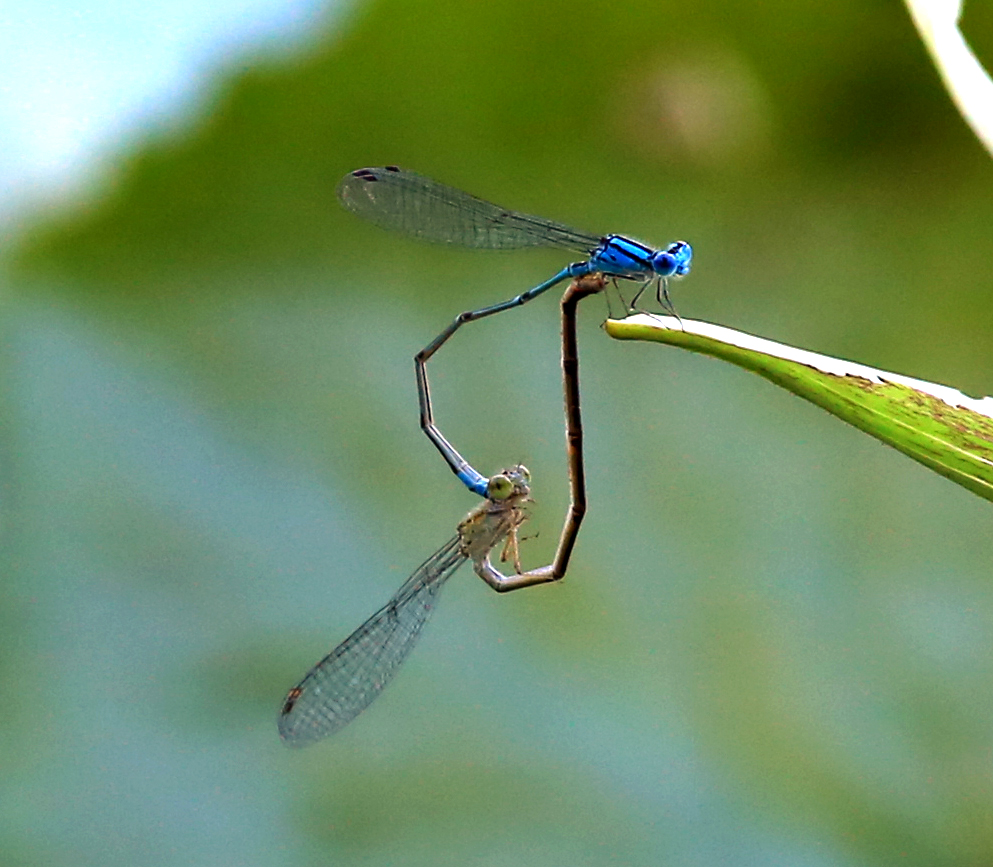
Mating

Illustration of a female wing

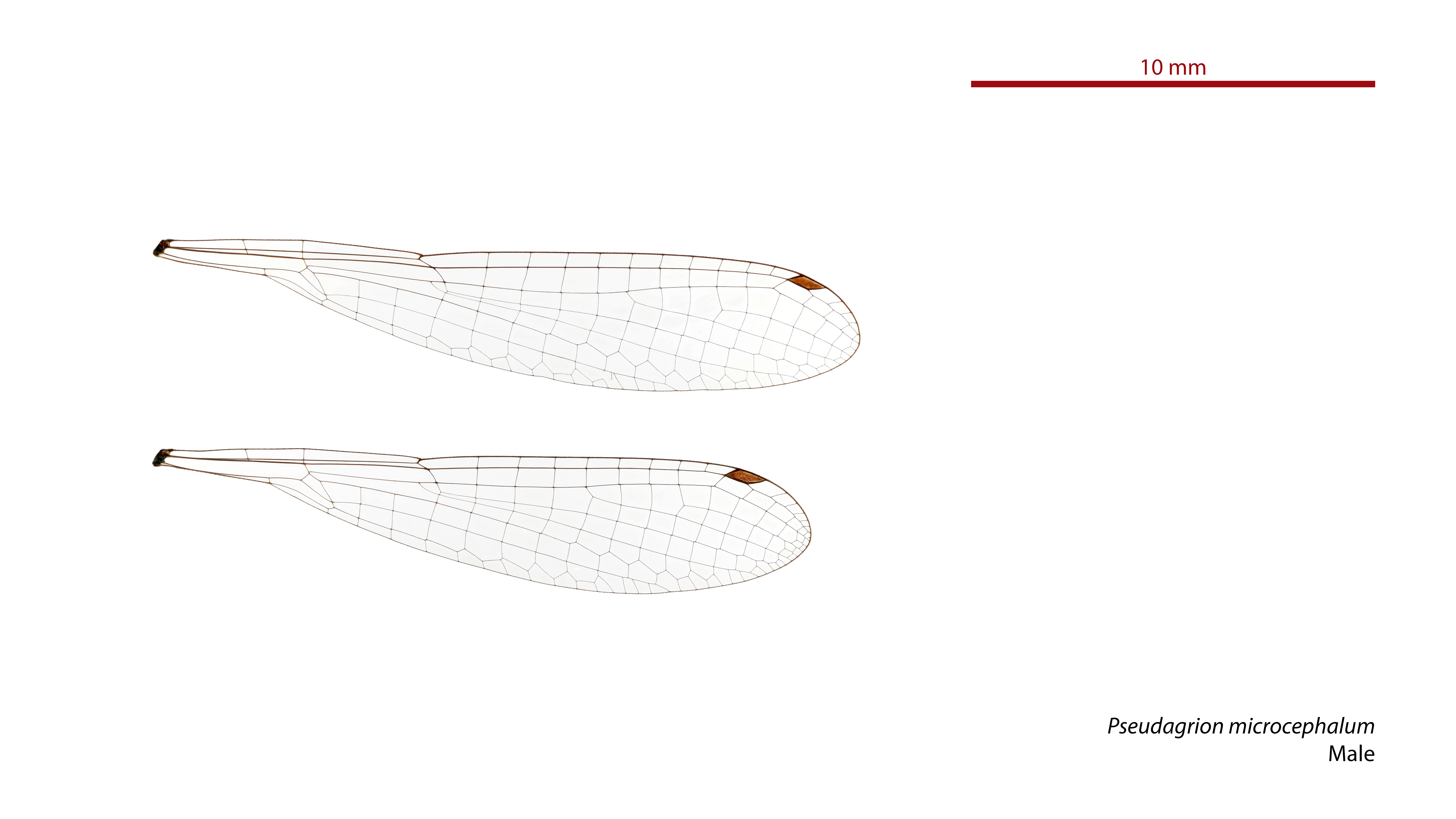
Photo of male wings
