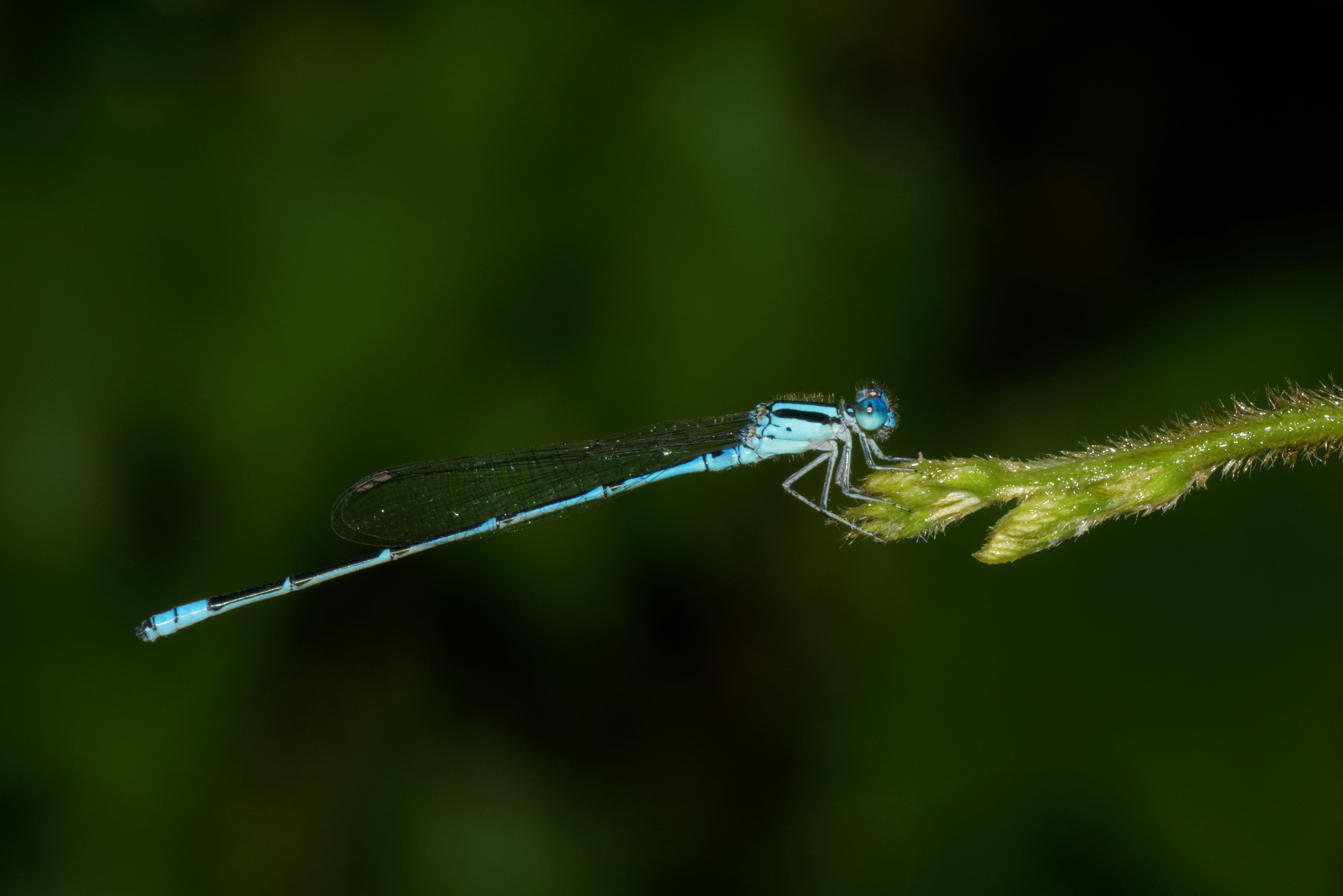
- Male

Conservation status
- Least Concern (IUCN 3.1)

Scientific classification
- Kingdom: Animalia
- Phylum: Arthropoda
- Clade: Pancrustacea
- Class: Insecta
- Order: Odonata
- Suborder: Zygoptera
- Family: Coenagrionidae
- Genus: Pseudagrion
- Species: P. australasiae

Binomial name
- Pseudagrion australasiae Selys, 1876

Synonyms
- Pseudagrion bengalense Laidlaw, 1919

= Pseudagrion australasiae =

Species of damselfly

Pseudagrion australasiae is a species of damselfly in the family Coenagrionidae. It is found in India, China, Indonesia, Malaysia, Myanmar, Singapore and Thailand.

It is a common damselfly, but usually under-recorded due to its similarity with other blue and black colored Pseudagrion species. Laidlaw described Pseudagrion bengalense as a new species, based on the comparison of his type in the Indian Museum with the mislabeled specimen of P. microcephalum as P. australasiae in British Museum. Lieftinck clarified the situation and placed P. bengalense as a synonym of P. australasiae.

== Description and habitat ==
It is a medium sized damselfly with blue eyes, dark on top. The back of the head is pale blue, bordered with black. Its thorax is azure blue with broad black dorsal and humeral stripes. Abdominal segments 1 and 2 are blue with black marks on the dorsum. A mark on segment 2 looks like a vase, broadly expanded at the middle. Segments 3 to 7 are black on the dorsum and blue on the sides. There are narrow blue apical annules on each segment. Segments 8 and 9 are blue with narrow black apical fringe. Segment 10 has an X-shaped, broad black mark on the dorsum and is blue on the sides. The superior anal appendages are black, diverging outward, and curving inward on the apices like hooks. They are bifid at apices and are half the length of segment 10. The inferiors are as long as the superiors.

It can be distinguished from Pseudagrion microcephalum, Pseudagrion spencei and Pseudagrion malabaricum by its short anal appendages. It can be further distinguished from Pseudagrion malabaricum by its superior anal appendages being bifid at the apices.

The eyes and thorax of the female are bluish green, marked as in the male. The color of the abdomen is similar to the male, but paler. Segments 8 and 9 are also black with fine apical blue rings. Segment 10 is pale blue.

It breeds in ponds, lakes, paddy fields and marshes.

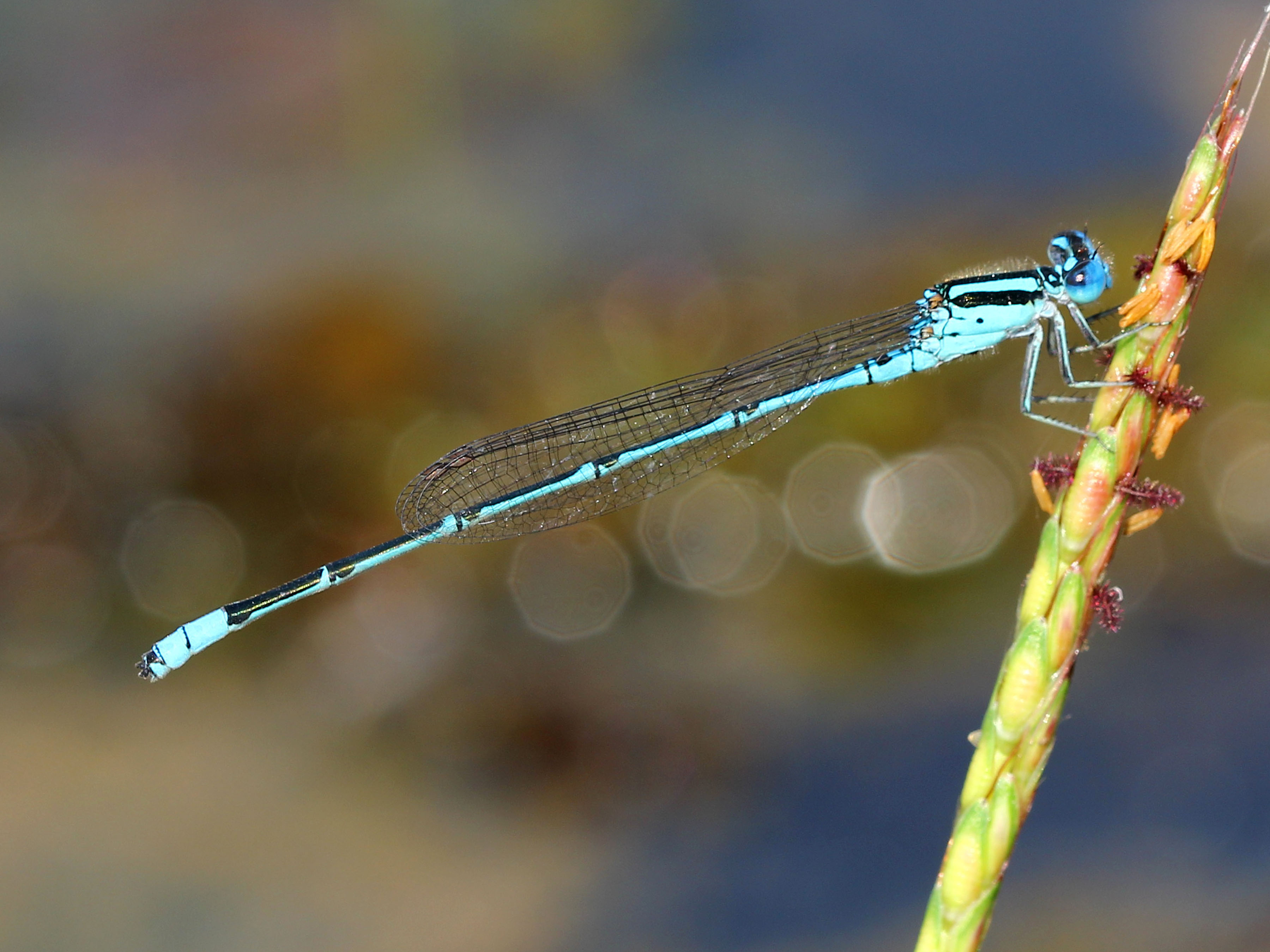
Male (lateral view)

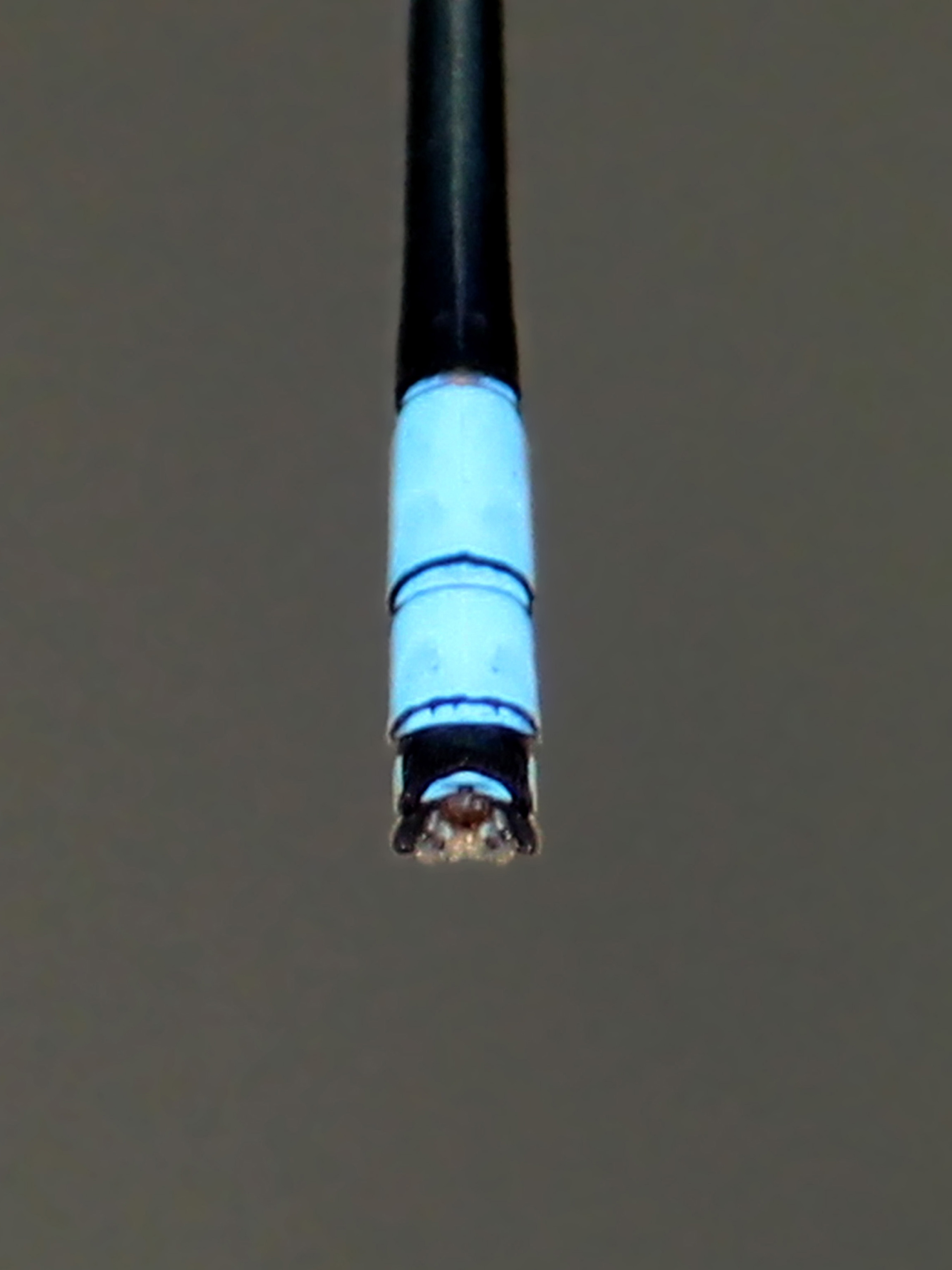
Male (anal appendages)

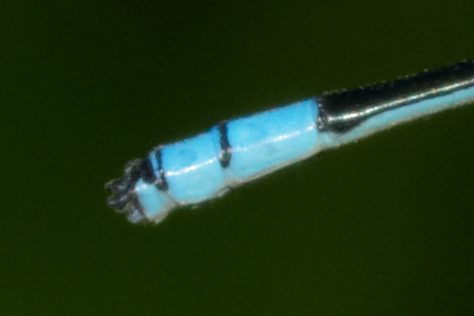
Male (anal appendages)

== See also ==
- List of odonates of India
- List of odonata of Kerala
