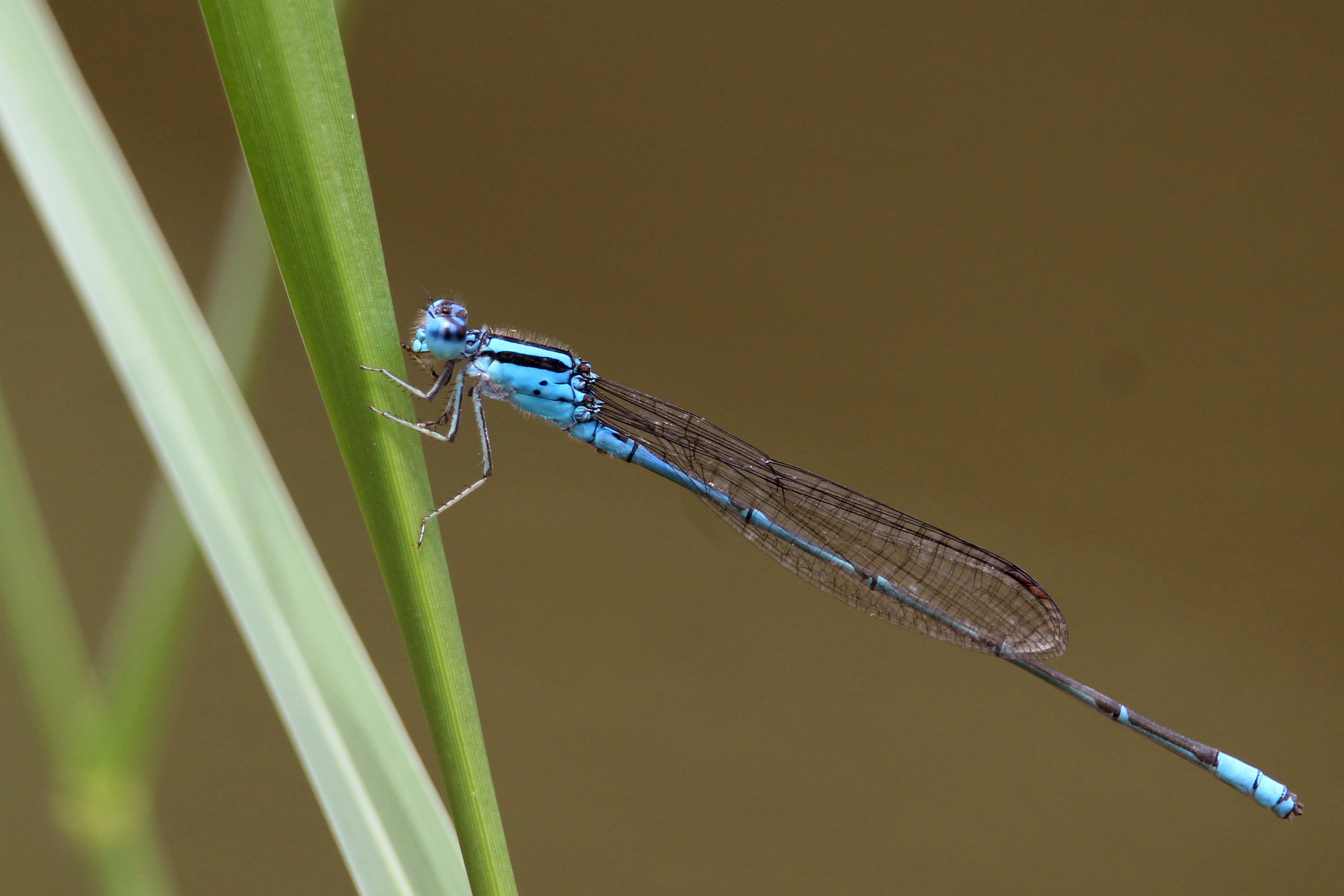
- male
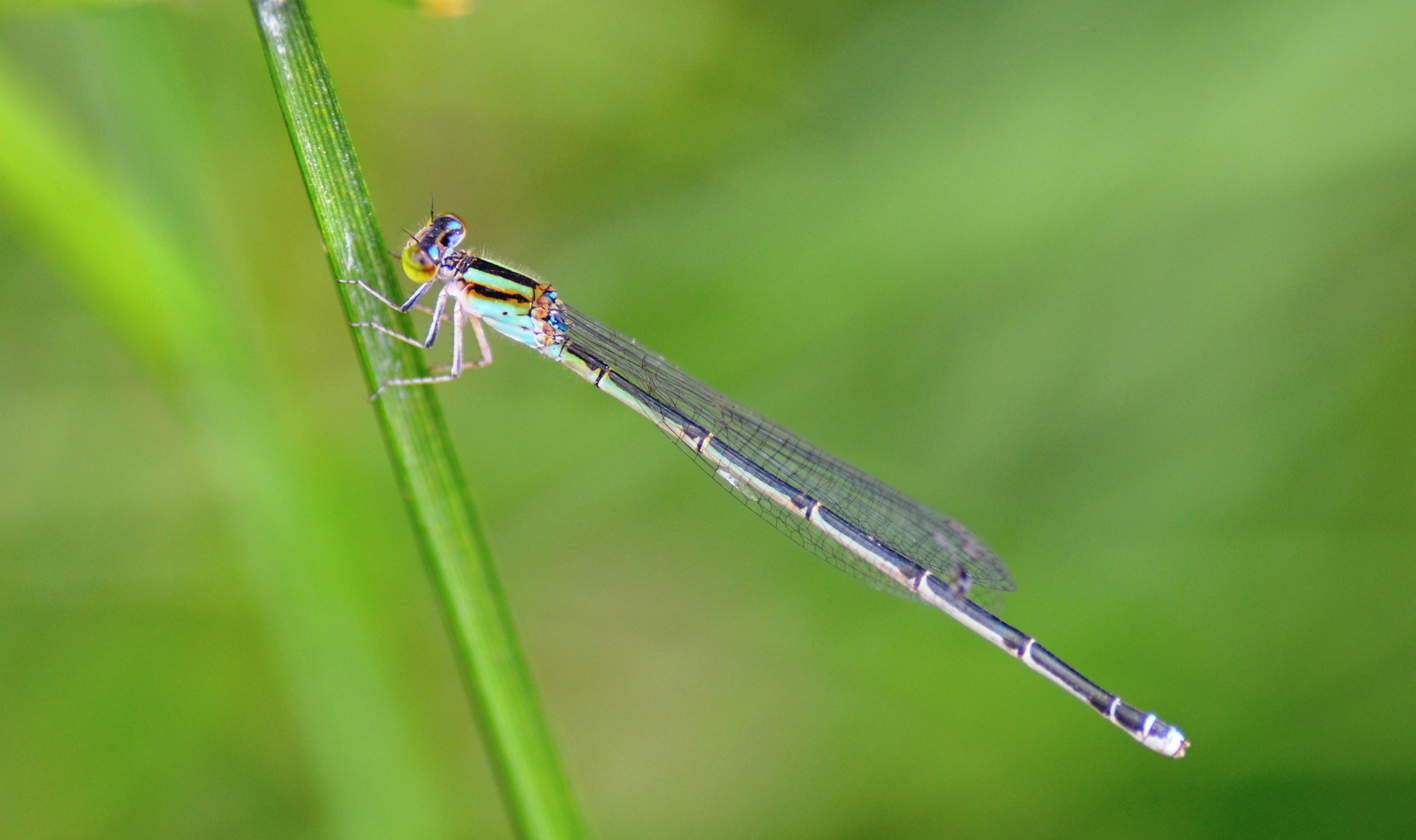
- female

Conservation status
- Least Concern (IUCN 3.1)

Scientific classification
- Kingdom: Animalia
- Phylum: Arthropoda
- Clade: Pancrustacea
- Class: Insecta
- Order: Odonata
- Suborder: Zygoptera
- Family: Coenagrionidae
- Genus: Pseudagrion
- Species: P. malabaricum

Binomial name
- Pseudagrion malabaricum Fraser, 1924

= Pseudagrion malabaricum =

Species of damselfly

Pseudagrion malabaricum, Malabar sprite, jungle grass dart, is a species of damselfly in the family Coenagrionidae. It is found in India, Sri Lanka, and Myanmar.

== Description and habitat ==
It is a medium-sized damselfly with blue eyes, dark on top. Back of the head is black in adults. Its thorax is azure blue with broad black dorsal, medial and humeral stripes. Abdominal segments 1 and 2 are blue with black marks on the dorsum. Mark on segment 2 looks like a chalice or thistle-head. Segments 3 to 7 are black on dorsum and blue on the sides. Segments 8 and 9 are blue with narrow black apical annules. Segment 10 is black on dorsum and blue on the sides. Superior anal appendages are black, diverging outward, and curving inward on the apices. They are smaller than segment 10; but not as small as those of Pseudagrion australasiae. Inferiors are very small.

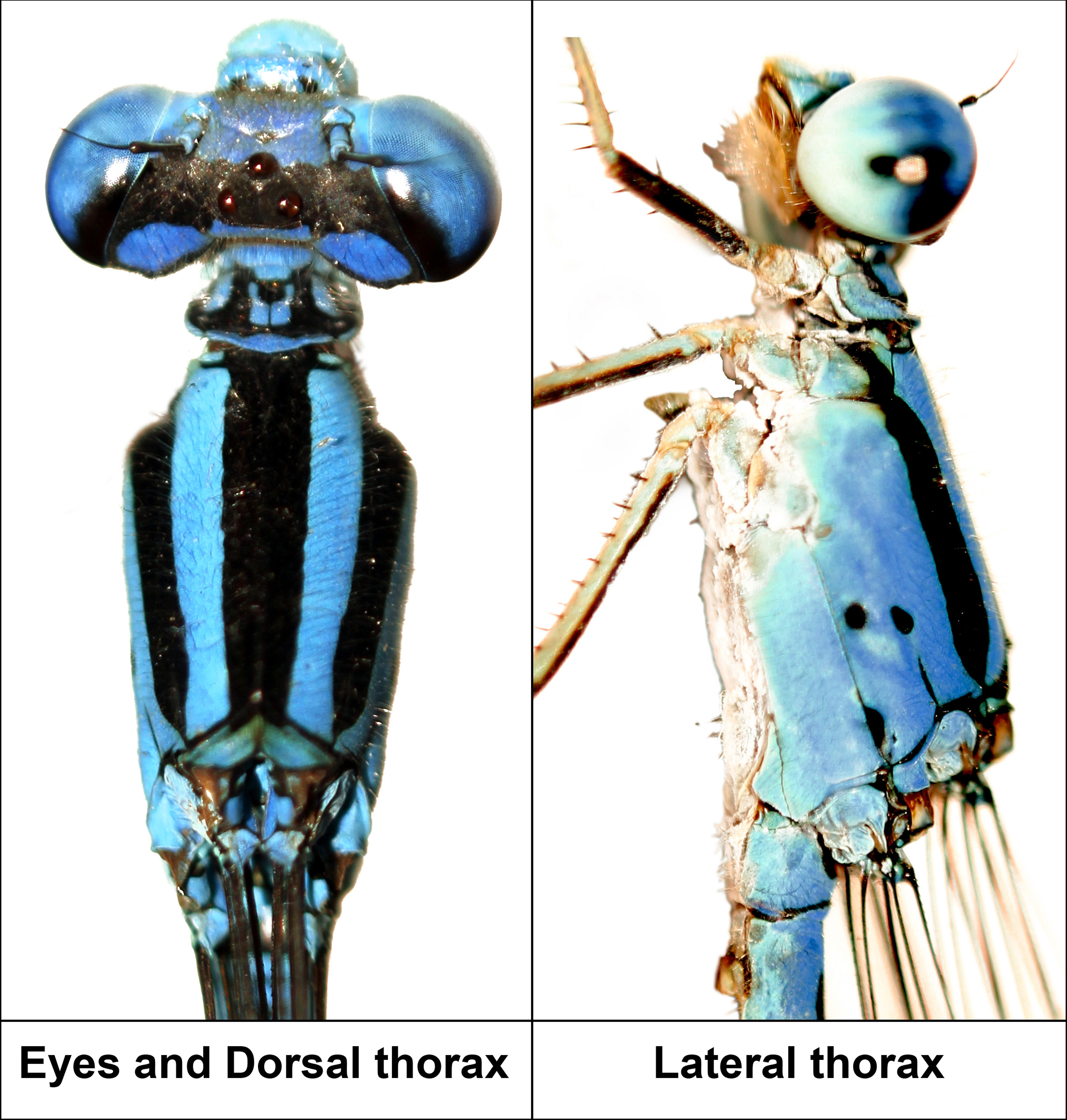
Head and thorax

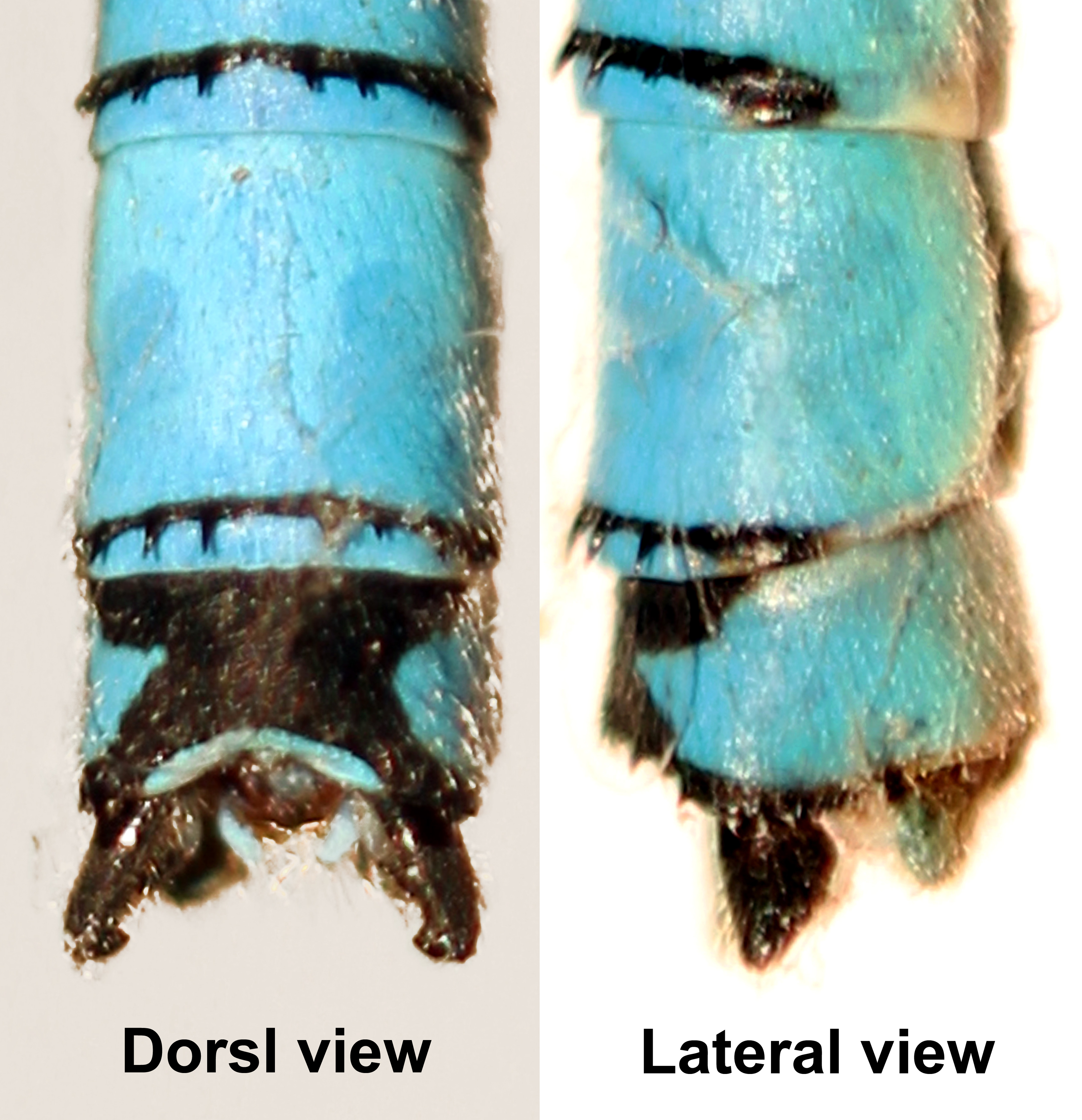
Anal appendages

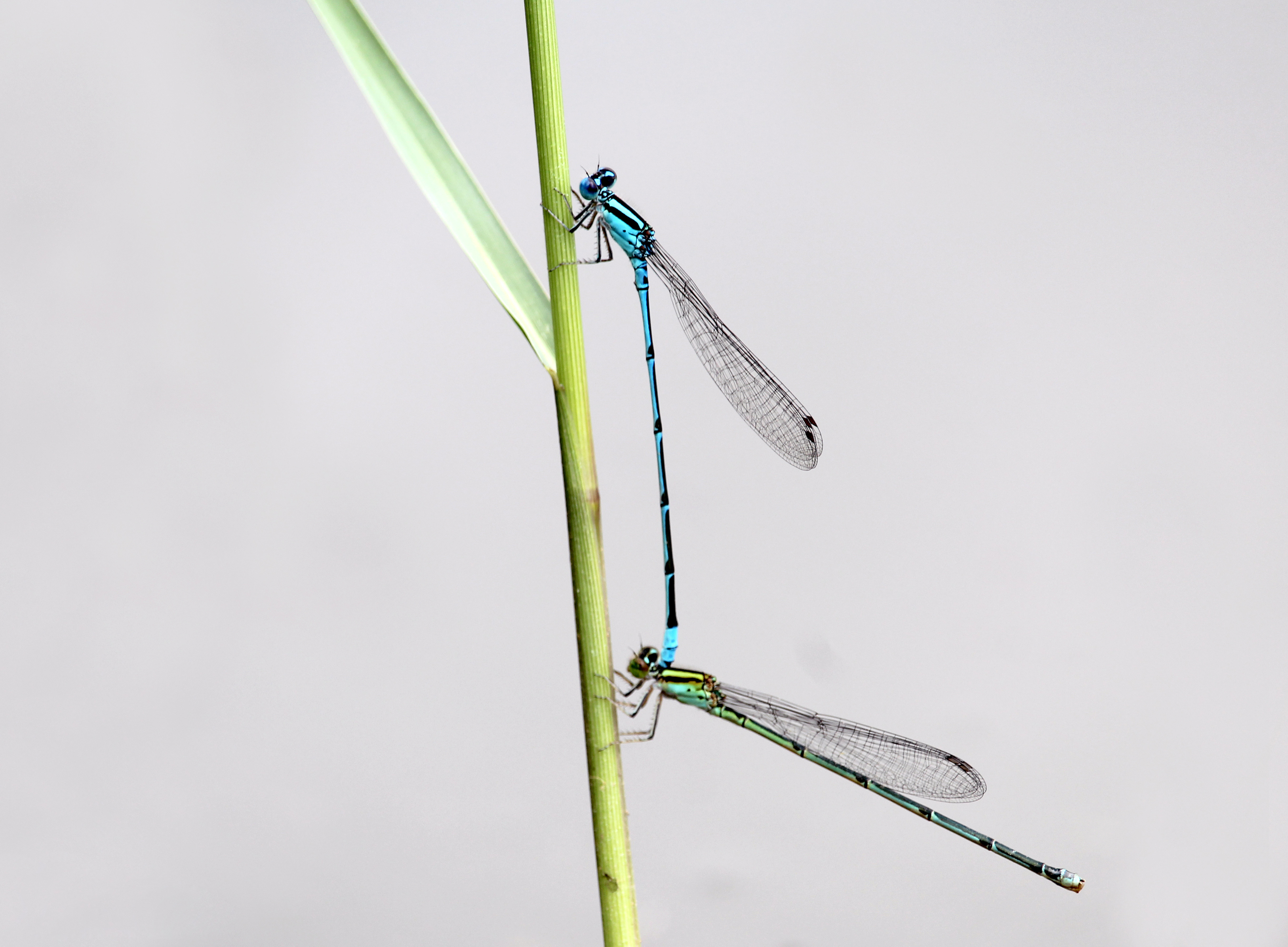
Tandem pair

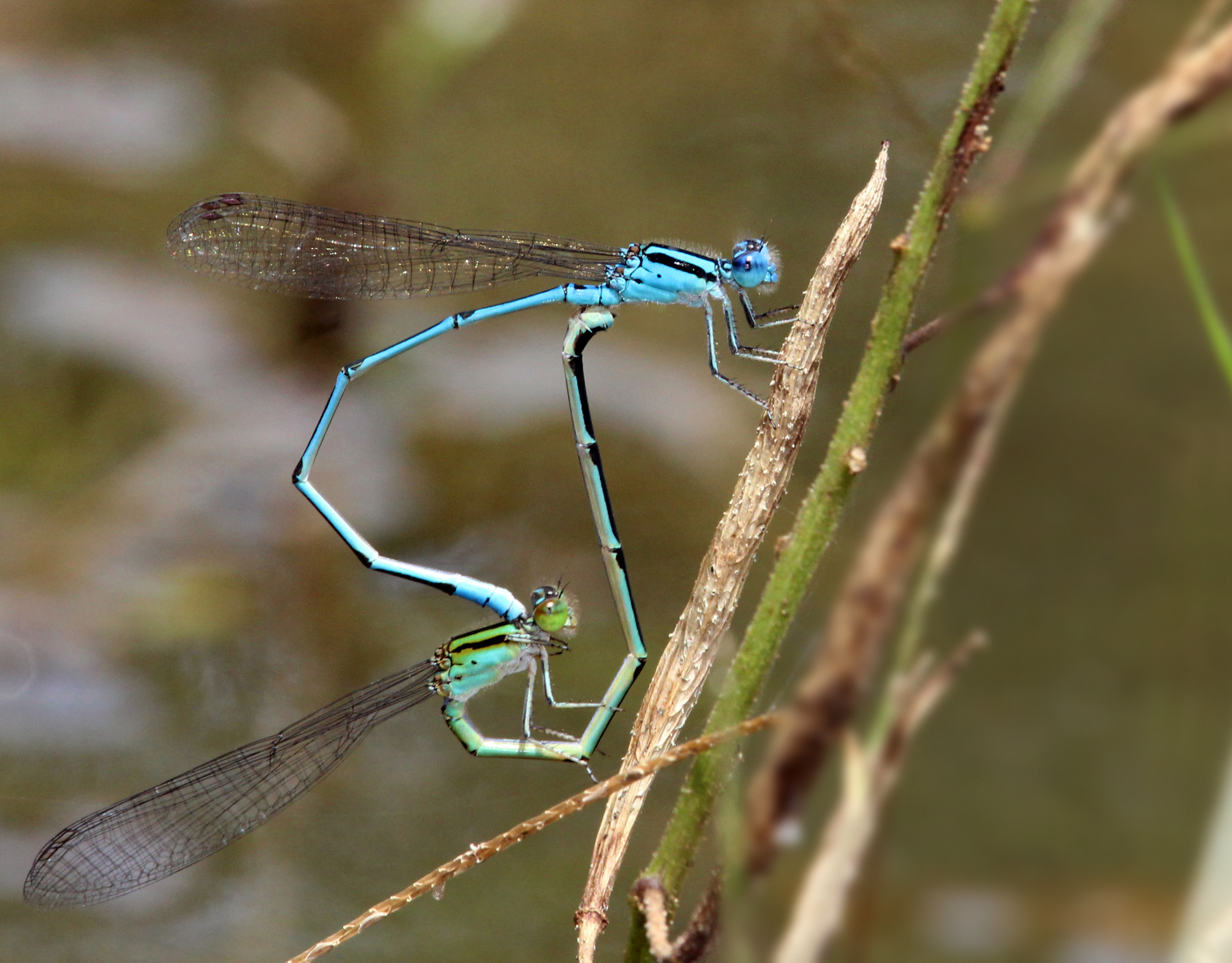
Mating

Eyes and thorax of the female is bluish green, marked as in the male. Color of the abdomen is similar to the male; but paler. Segments 8 and 9 are also black with fine apical blue rings. Segment 10 is pale blue.

It breeds in ponds, lakes, paddy fields and marshes in the hills.

== See also ==
- List of odonates of India
- List of odonates of Sri Lanka
- List of odonates of Myanmar
