= Platycnemidinae =

Scientific classification
- Kingdom: Animalia
- Phylum: Arthropoda
- Clade: Pancrustacea
- Class: Insecta
- Order: Odonata
- Suborder: Zygoptera
- Family: Platycnemididae
- Subfamily: Platycnemidinae; Bianchi, 1904

Genera
- Copera; Matticnemis; Platycnemis; Proplatycnemis; Pseudocopera; Spesbona

Subfamily of damselflies

Platycnemidinae is a subfamily of damselflies in the family Platycnemididae. World Odonata list places six genera and 40 species in the subfamily.

== Taxonomic history ==
Dijkstra and colleagues recognised Platycnemidinae within Platycnemididae in 2014. They divided the subfamily into two tribes, Coperini and Platycnemidini.
