= Calicnemiinae =

Scientific classification
- Kingdom: Animalia
- Phylum: Arthropoda
- Clade: Pancrustacea
- Class: Insecta
- Order: Odonata
- Suborder: Zygoptera
- Family: Platycnemididae
- Subfamily: Calicnemiinae; Fraser, 1957

Genera
- Asthenocnemis; Calicnemia; Coeliccia; Indocnemis

Subfamily of damselflies

Calicnemiinae is a subfamily of damselflies in the family Platycnemididae.

== Taxonomic history ==
Fraser introduced the subfamily in 1957 as Calicneminae. Gassmann later explained that the spelling should be Calicnemiinae, based on the genus name Calicnemia. Dijkstra and colleagues recognized the subfamily in 2014, including three genera in their analysis. World Odonata List currently places four genera in it, including Asthenocnemis.
