= Idiocnemis australis =

Scientific classification
- Domain: Eukaryota
- Kingdom: Animalia
- Phylum: Arthropoda
- Class: Insecta
- Order: Odonata
- Suborder: Zygoptera
- Family: Platycnemididae
- Subfamily: Idiocnemidinae
- Genus: Idiocnemis
- Species: I. australis

Binomial name
- Idiocnemis australis Gassmann, 1999

Species of damselfly

Idiocnemis australis is a species of white-legged damselfly in the family Platycnemididae.
