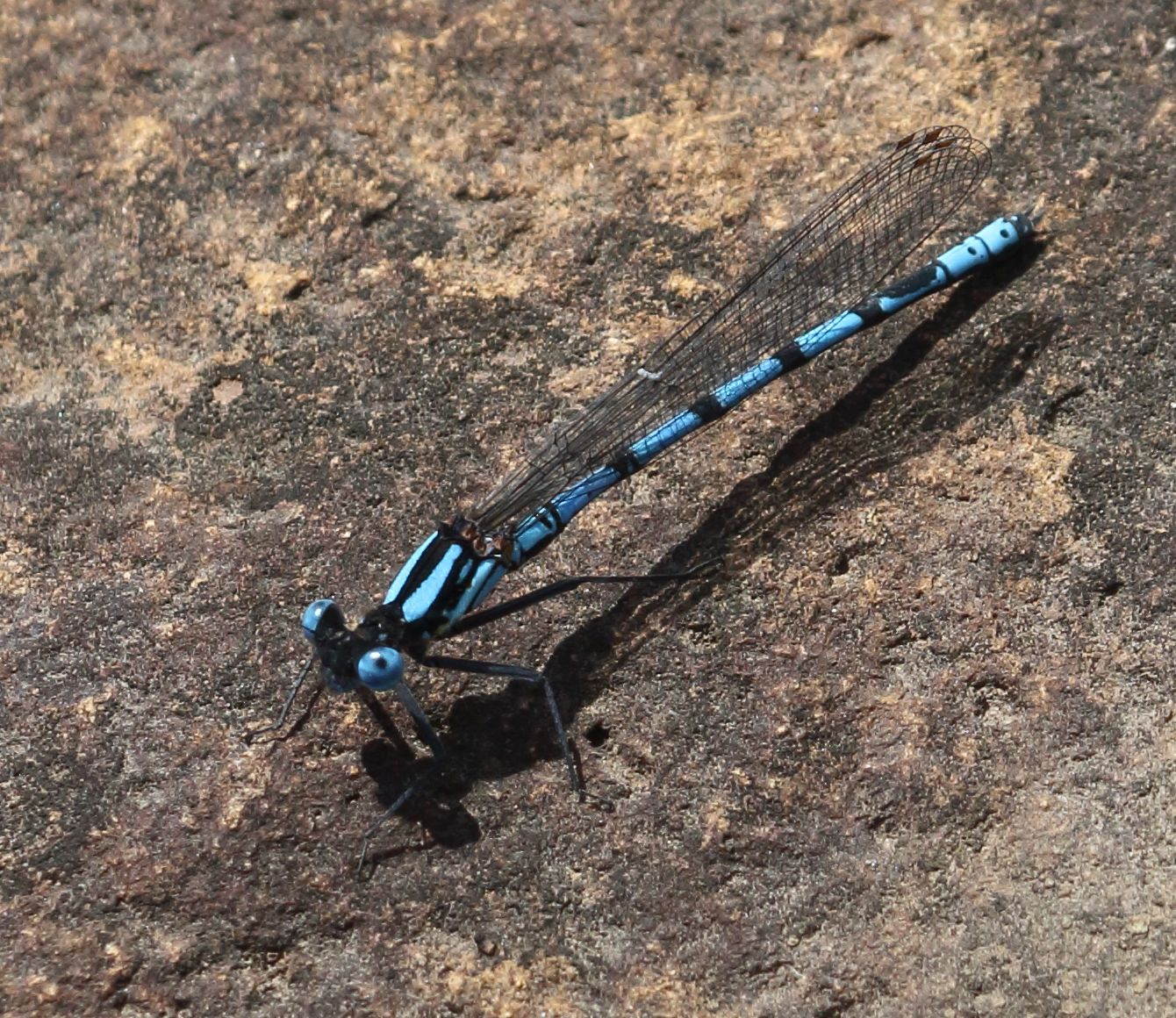

Conservation status
- Endangered (IUCN 3.1)

Scientific classification
- Kingdom: Animalia
- Phylum: Arthropoda
- Class: Insecta
- Order: Odonata
- Suborder: Zygoptera
- Family: Platycnemididae
- Subfamily: Allocnemidinae
- Genus: Metacnemis; Selys, 1863
- Species: M. valida

Binomial name
- Metacnemis valida Hagen in Sélys, 1863

= Metacnemis =

Genus of damselflies

Metacnemis is a genus of damselfly in the family Platycnemididae. It contains one species: Metacnemis valida.

Spesbona angusta was moved from this genus in 2013. This genus was included in the subfamily Allocnemidinae in 2014.
