= Onychargiinae =

Scientific classification
- Kingdom: Animalia
- Phylum: Arthropoda
- Clade: Pancrustacea
- Class: Insecta
- Order: Odonata
- Suborder: Zygoptera
- Family: Platycnemididae
- Subfamily: Onychargiinae; Dijkstra, Kalkman, Dow, Stokvis & van Tol, 2014

Genera
- Onychargia; Paracnemis

Subfamily of damselflies

Onychargiinae is a subfamily of damselflies in the family Platycnemididae. World Odonata List places two genera and five species in the subfamily.

== Taxonomic history ==
Dijkstra and colleagues established Onychargiinae in 2014 for the genera Onychargia and Paracnemis. Their analyses placed the two genera together within Platycnemididae; Onychargia had previously been classified in Coenagrionidae.
