= Denticnemis =

Scientific classification
- Kingdom: Animalia
- Phylum: Arthropoda
- Clade: Pancrustacea
- Class: Insecta
- Order: Odonata
- Suborder: Zygoptera
- Family: Platycnemididae
- Genus: Denticnemis; Bartenev, 1956
- Species: D. bicolor

Binomial name
- Denticnemis bicolor Bartenev, 1956

Genus of damselflies

Denticnemis was up until recently a genus of white-legged damselfly in the family Platycnemididae.

There was one described species in Denticnemis, D. bicolor. It is now a synonym of Pseudocopera rubripes.
