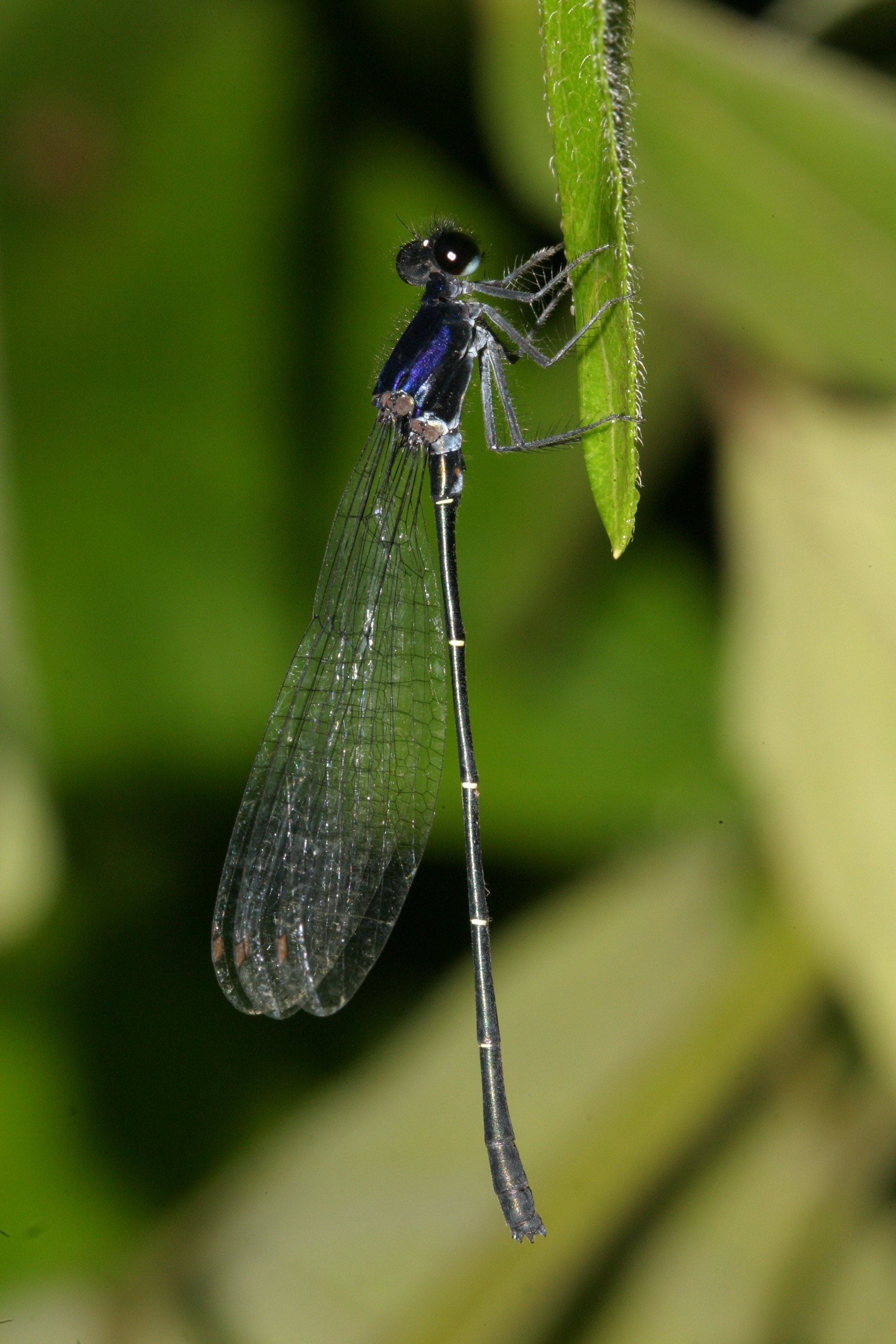
- Male
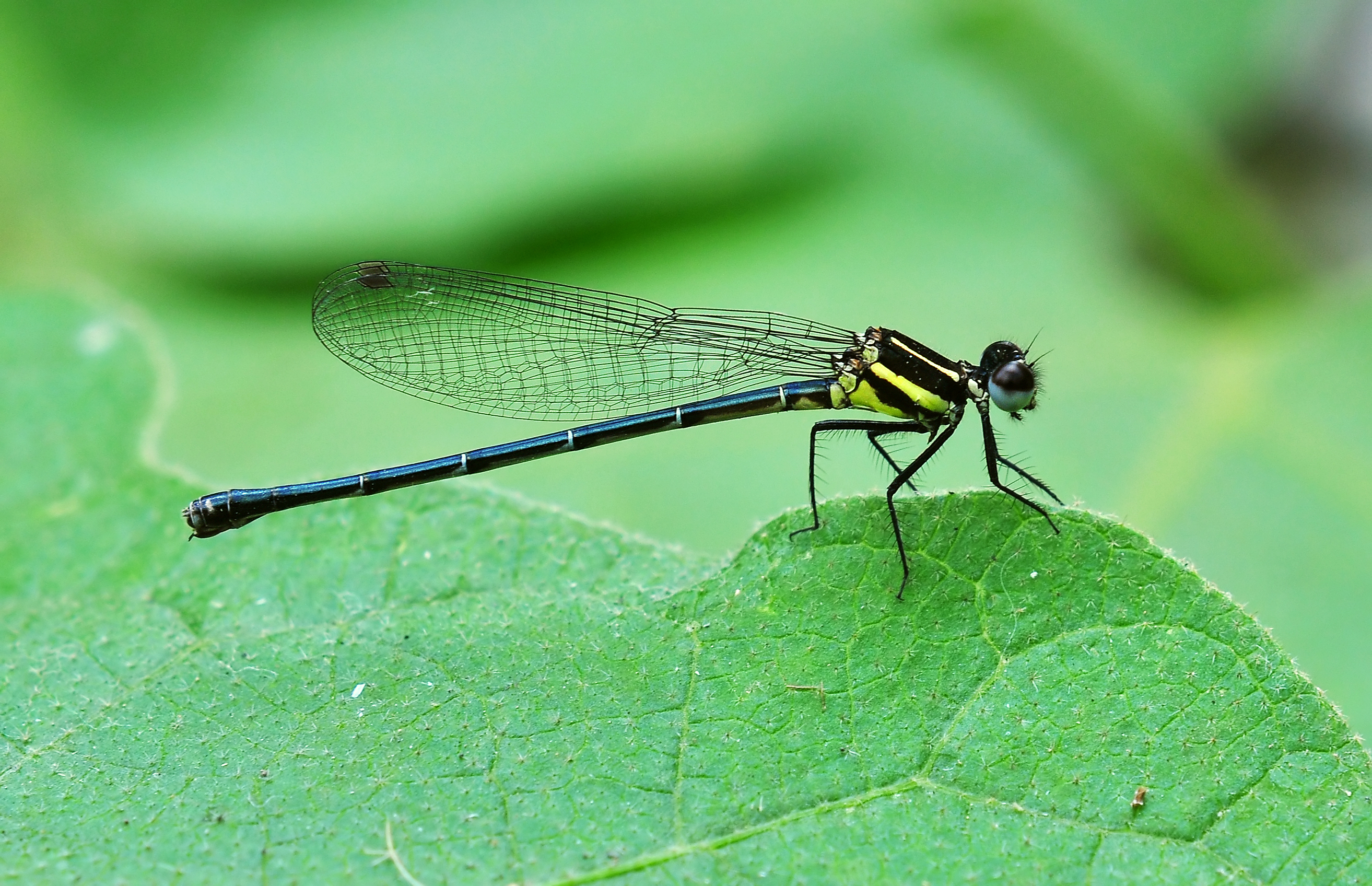
- Female

Conservation status
- Least Concern (IUCN 3.1)

Scientific classification
- Kingdom: Animalia
- Phylum: Arthropoda
- Class: Insecta
- Order: Odonata
- Suborder: Zygoptera
- Family: Platycnemididae
- Genus: Onychargia
- Species: O. atrocyana

Binomial name
- Onychargia atrocyana Selys, 1865

= Onychargia atrocyana =

Species of damselfly

Onychargia atrocyana a species of damselfly in the family Platycnemididae. This species is commonly known as the marsh dancer or black marsh dart. It is found in Asia: Bangladesh, China, Hong Kong, Indonesia, India, Sri Lanka, Myanmar, Malaysia, Philippines, Peninsular Malaysia, Singapore, Thailand, Viet Nam.

== Description and habitat ==
It is a medium sized damselfly with velvet-black head, thorax and black-capped brown eyes. The dorsum of the thorax has narrow citron-yellow ante humeral stripes in the sub-adult and teneral stage. The sides are citron-yellow, marked with a broad oblique black stripe over the postero-lateral suture in that stage. But all these marks are obscured by pruinescence in adults. Abdomen is black, unmarked in the adult; but with narrow bluish basal rings on segments 3 to 6. There are yellow marks on the lateral sides of segment 1 and 2 in sub-adults. Female is similar to the sub-adult male with yellow marks.

It breeds in ponds and marshes in forests.

== See also ==
- List of odonates of India
- List of odonata of Kerala
