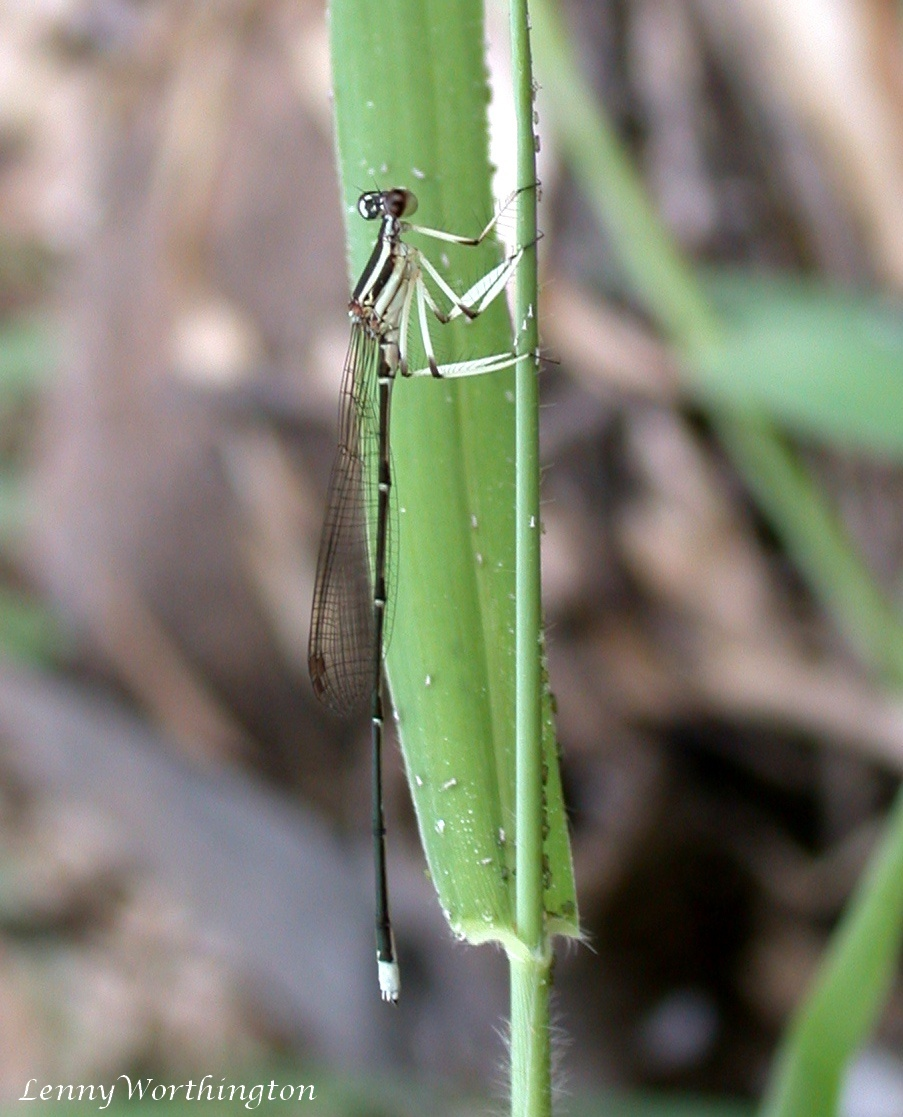

Scientific classification
- Domain: Eukaryota
- Kingdom: Animalia
- Phylum: Arthropoda
- Class: Insecta
- Order: Odonata
- Suborder: Zygoptera
- Family: Platycnemididae
- Genus: Pseudocopera
- Species: P. ciliata

Binomial name
- Pseudocopera ciliata Selys, 1863

Synonyms
- Copera ciliata (Selys, 1863); Copera stevensi Laidlaw, 1914; Copera trotteri (Fraser, 1922); Pseudocopera trotteri Fraser, 1922; Psilocnemis ciliata Selys, 1863

= Pseudocopera ciliata =

Species of damselfly

Pseudocopera ciliata, commonly known as the black-kneed featherlegs, is a species of white-legged damselfly in the family Platycnemididae. It can be found in China, Indochina and western Malesia.
