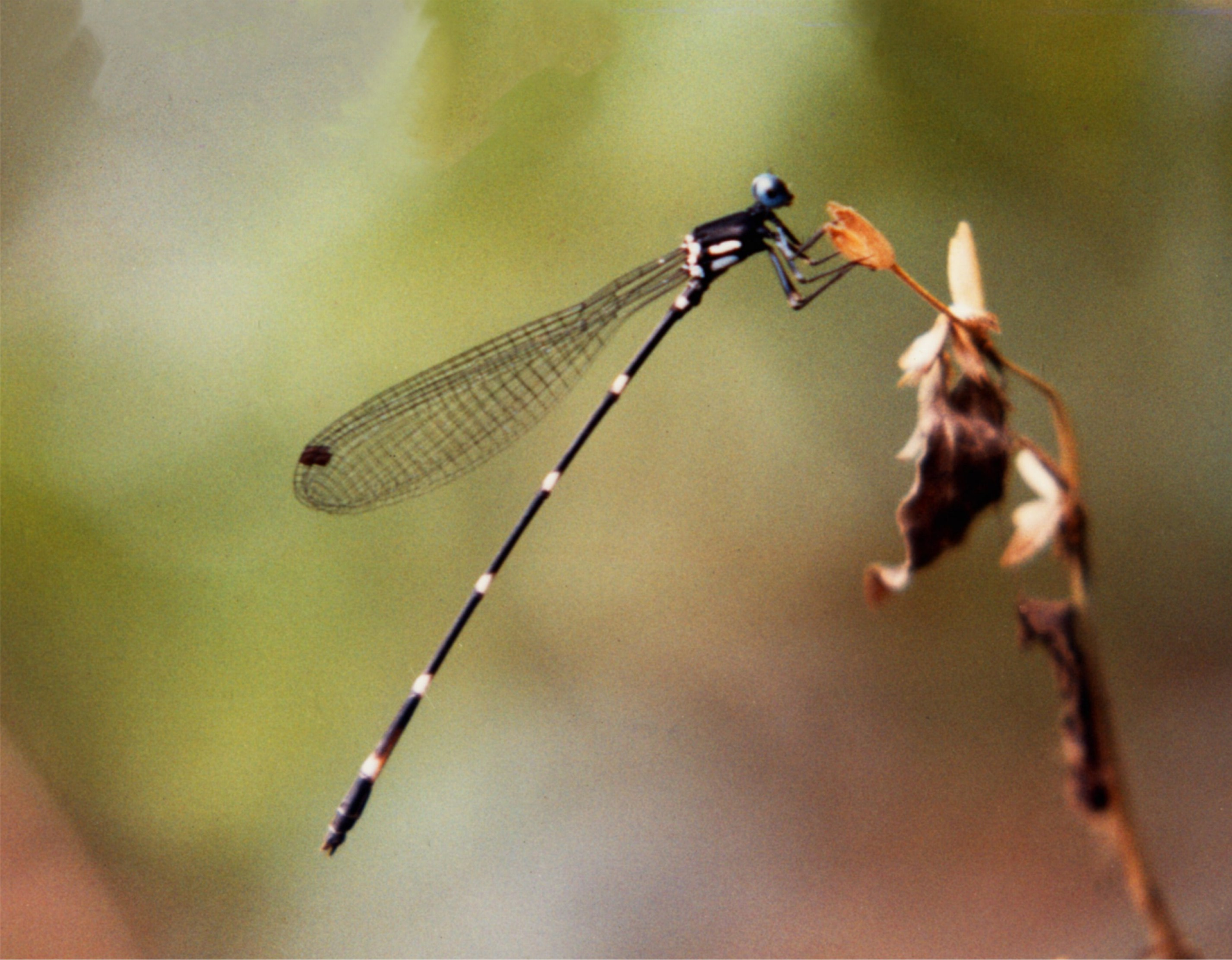

Conservation status
- Critically Endangered (IUCN 3.1)

Scientific classification
- Kingdom: Animalia
- Phylum: Arthropoda
- Class: Insecta
- Order: Odonata
- Suborder: Zygoptera
- Family: Platycnemididae
- Genus: Risiocnemis
- Species: R. seidenschwarzi

Binomial name
- Risiocnemis seidenschwarzi Hämäläinen, 2000

= Risiocnemis seidenschwarzi =

Species of damselfly

Risiocnemis seidenschwarzi is a species of damselfly in the family Platycnemididae and the only known species in the genus Risiocnemis. It is endemic to the Philippines. It can only be found in a small river area in one of the last forests in Central Cebu, which is threatened by habitat loss, illegal logging, and water pollution. The survival of the species is believed to rely solely only the continued conservation of the river where it lives and breeds. There are no conservation programs yet to be administered in the area where it lives. It is the most endangered insect species in the whole Philippine archipelago. It is one of the 2012 World's 100 Most Threatened Species, which was compiled by IUCN and the Zoological Society of London.
