= I. bidentata =

I. bidentata may refer to:

- Idiocnemis bidentata, a white-legged damselfly
- Isotomiella bidentata, a springtail first described in 1950
