= Idiocnemis adelbertensis =

Conservation status
- Near Threatened (IUCN 3.1)

Scientific classification
- Kingdom: Animalia
- Phylum: Arthropoda
- Class: Insecta
- Order: Odonata
- Suborder: Zygoptera
- Family: Platycnemididae
- Genus: Idiocnemis
- Species: I. adelbertensis

Binomial name
- Idiocnemis adelbertensis Gassmann, 1999

Species of damselfly

Idiocnemis adelbertensis is a species of white-legged damselfly in the family Platycnemididae.

The IUCN conservation status of Idiocnemis adelbertensis is "NT", near threatened. The species may be considered threatened in the near future. The IUCN status was reviewed in 2009.
