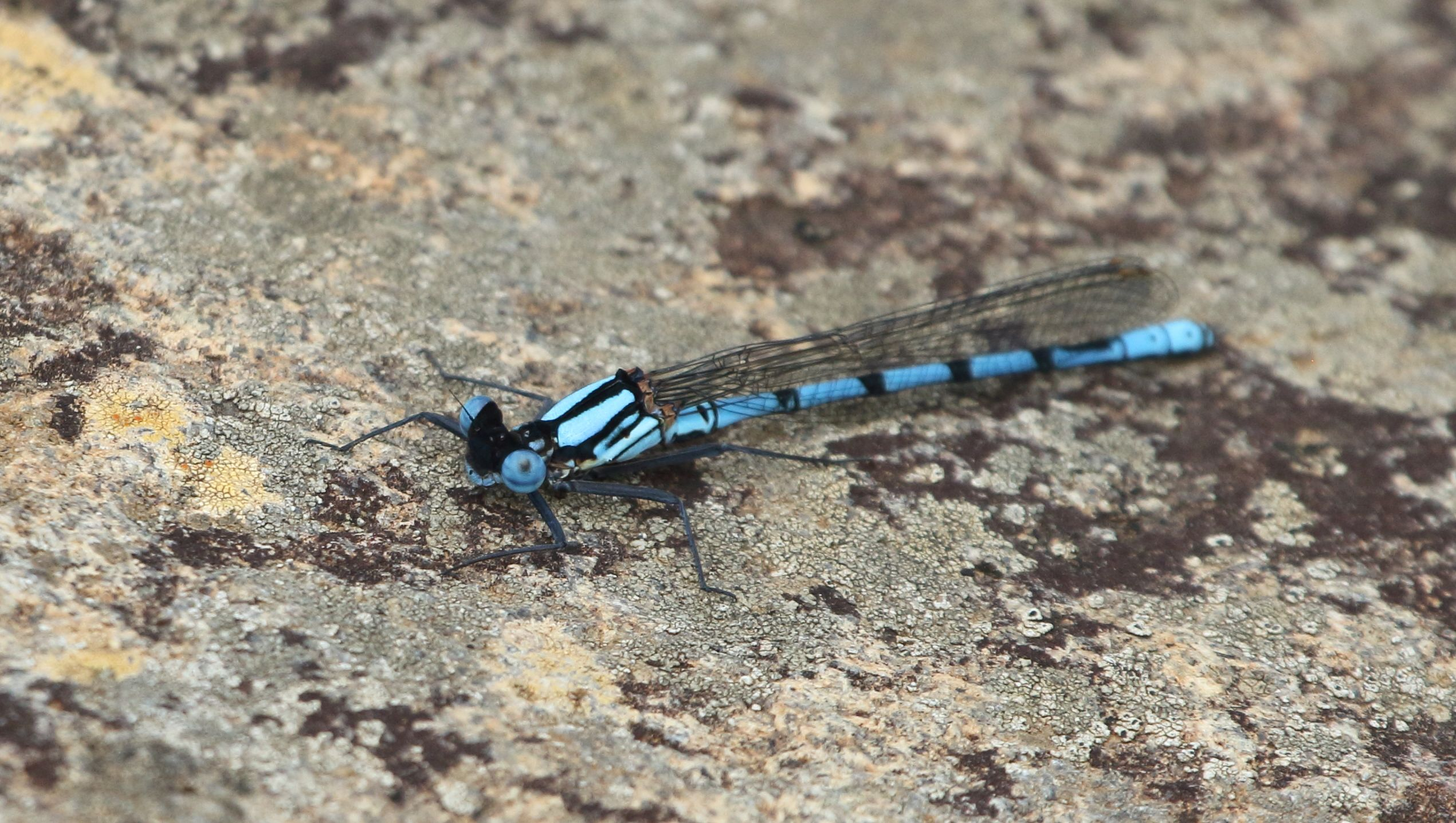
- Male
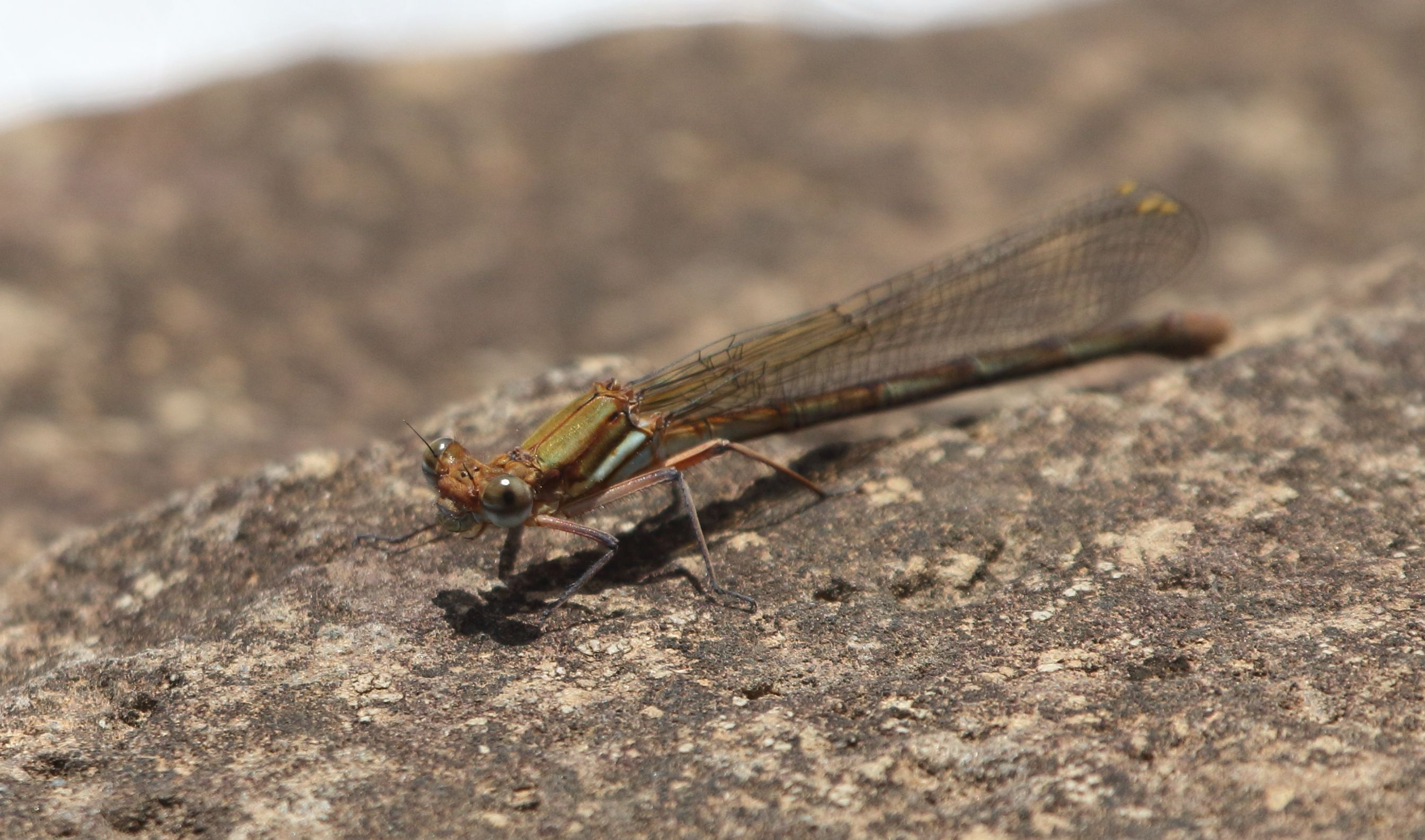
- Female

Conservation status
- Endangered (IUCN 3.1)

Scientific classification
- Kingdom: Animalia
- Phylum: Arthropoda
- Class: Insecta
- Order: Odonata
- Suborder: Zygoptera
- Family: Platycnemididae
- Genus: Metacnemis
- Species: M. valida

Binomial name
- Metacnemis valida Hagen in Sélys, 1863

= Metacnemis valida =

Species of damselfly

Metacnemis valida (blue riverjack) is a species of damselfly in the family Platycnemididae. It is endemic to South Africa. Its natural habitat is rivers. It is threatened by habitat loss.

== Gallery ==
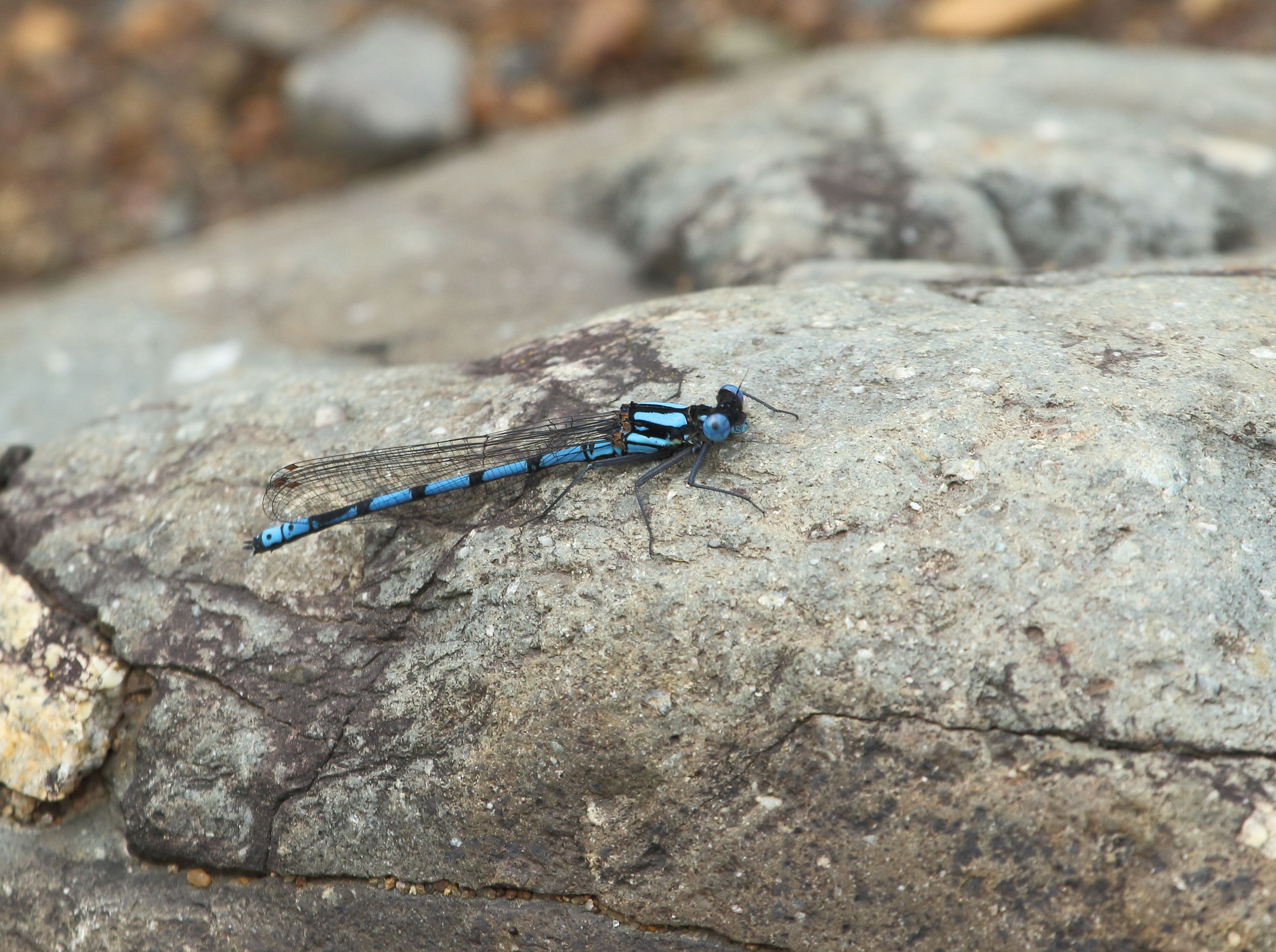
Male

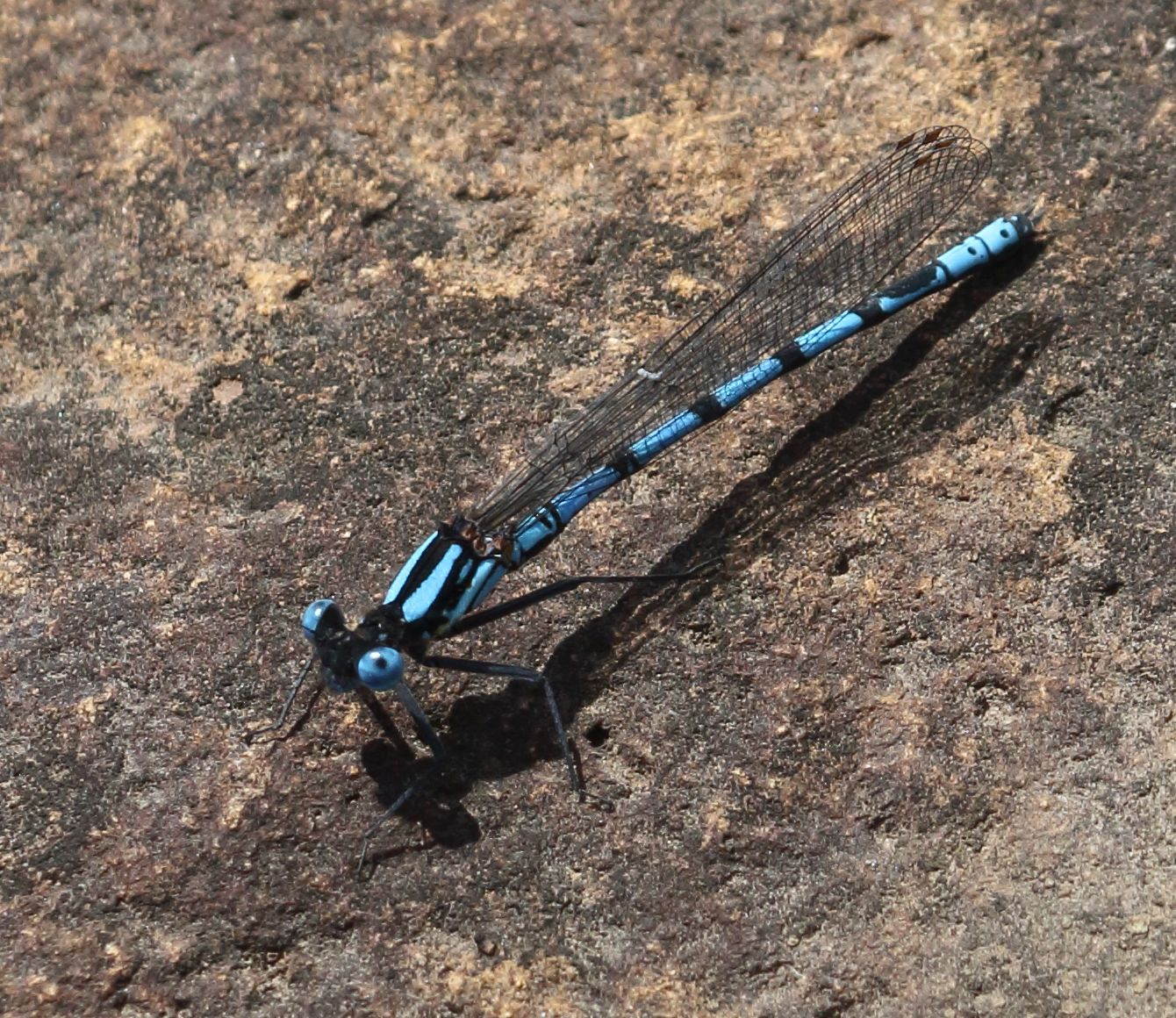
Male

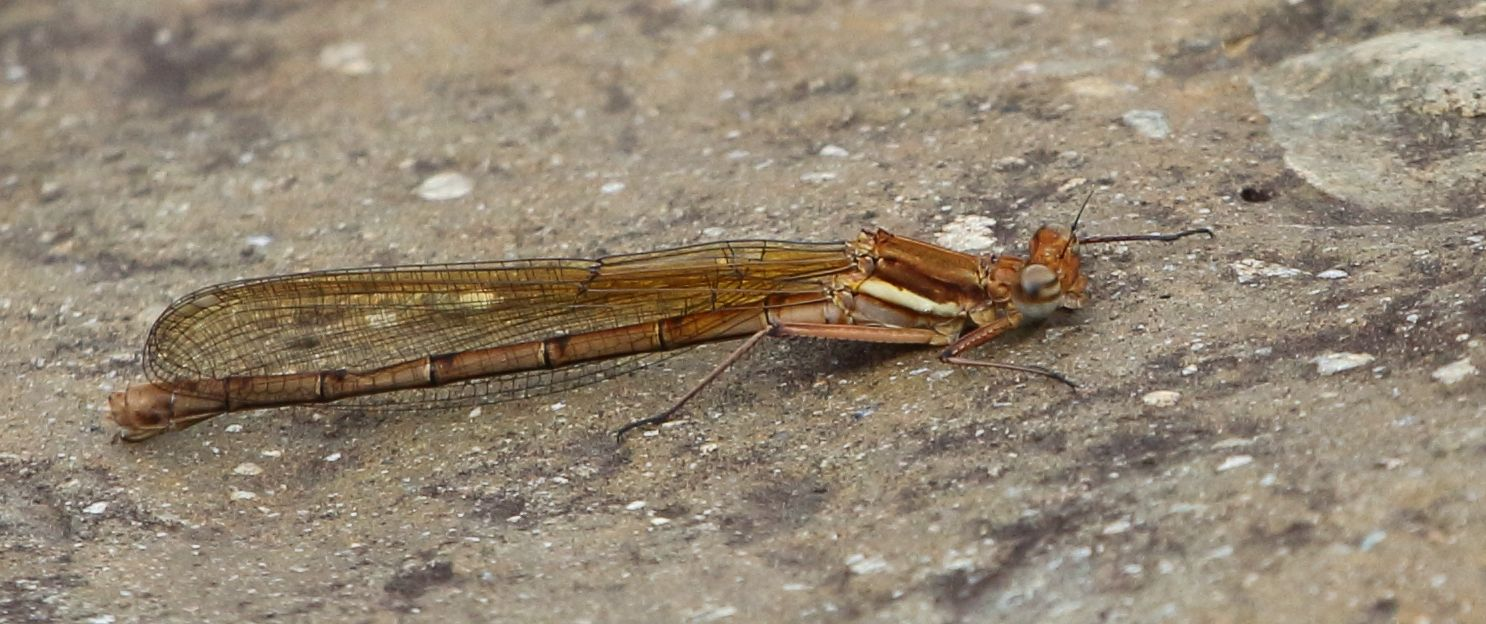
Female

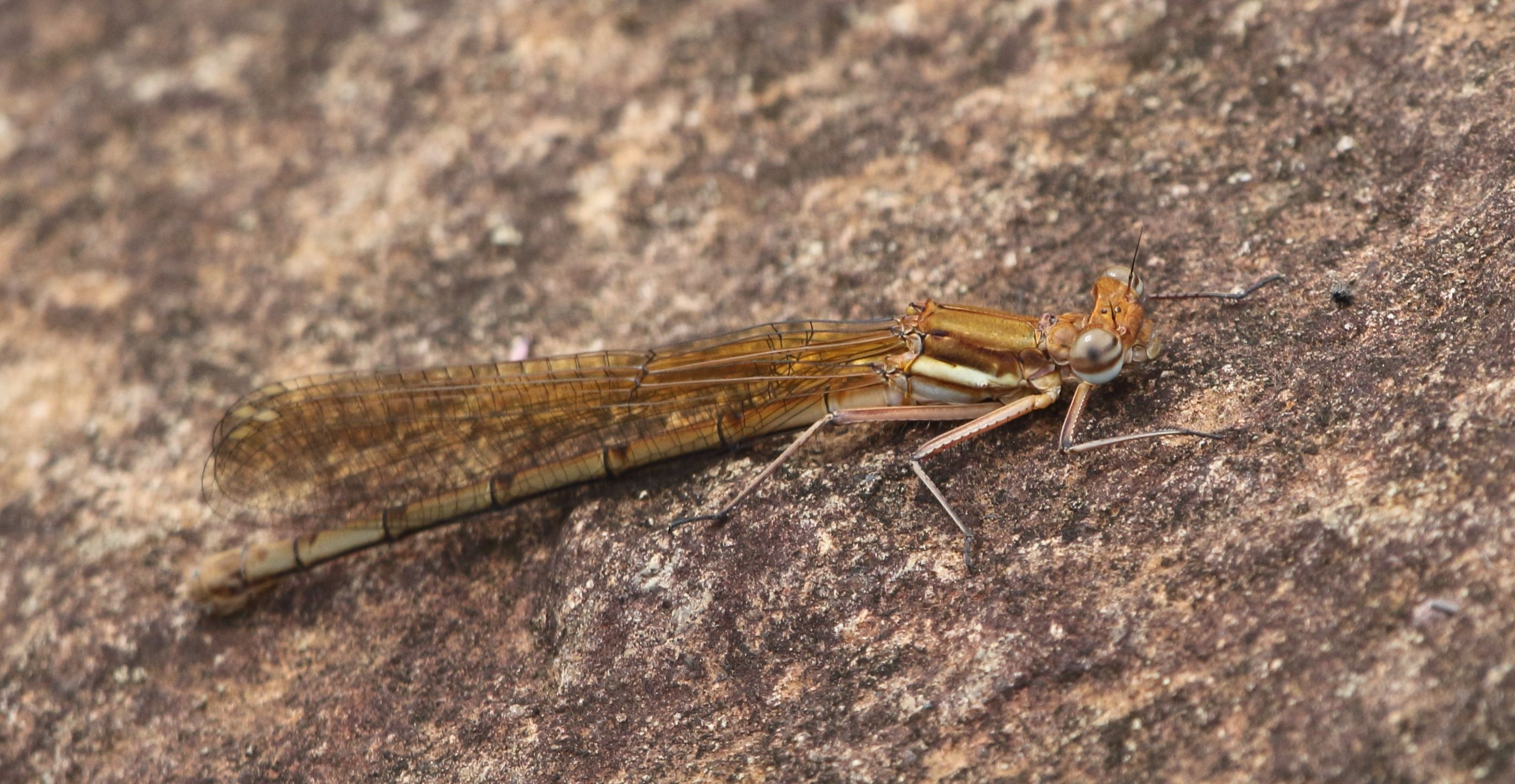
Female

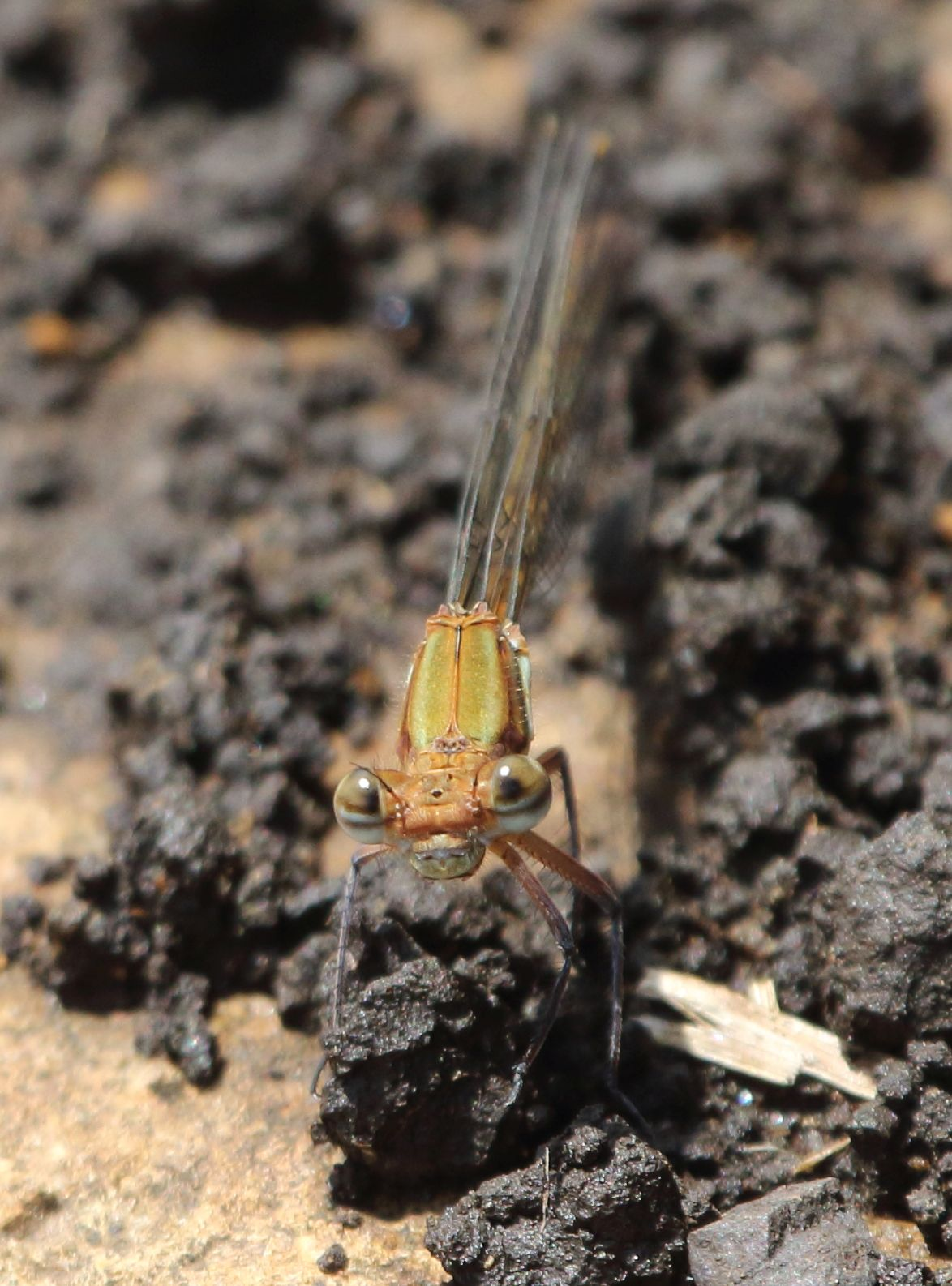
Female

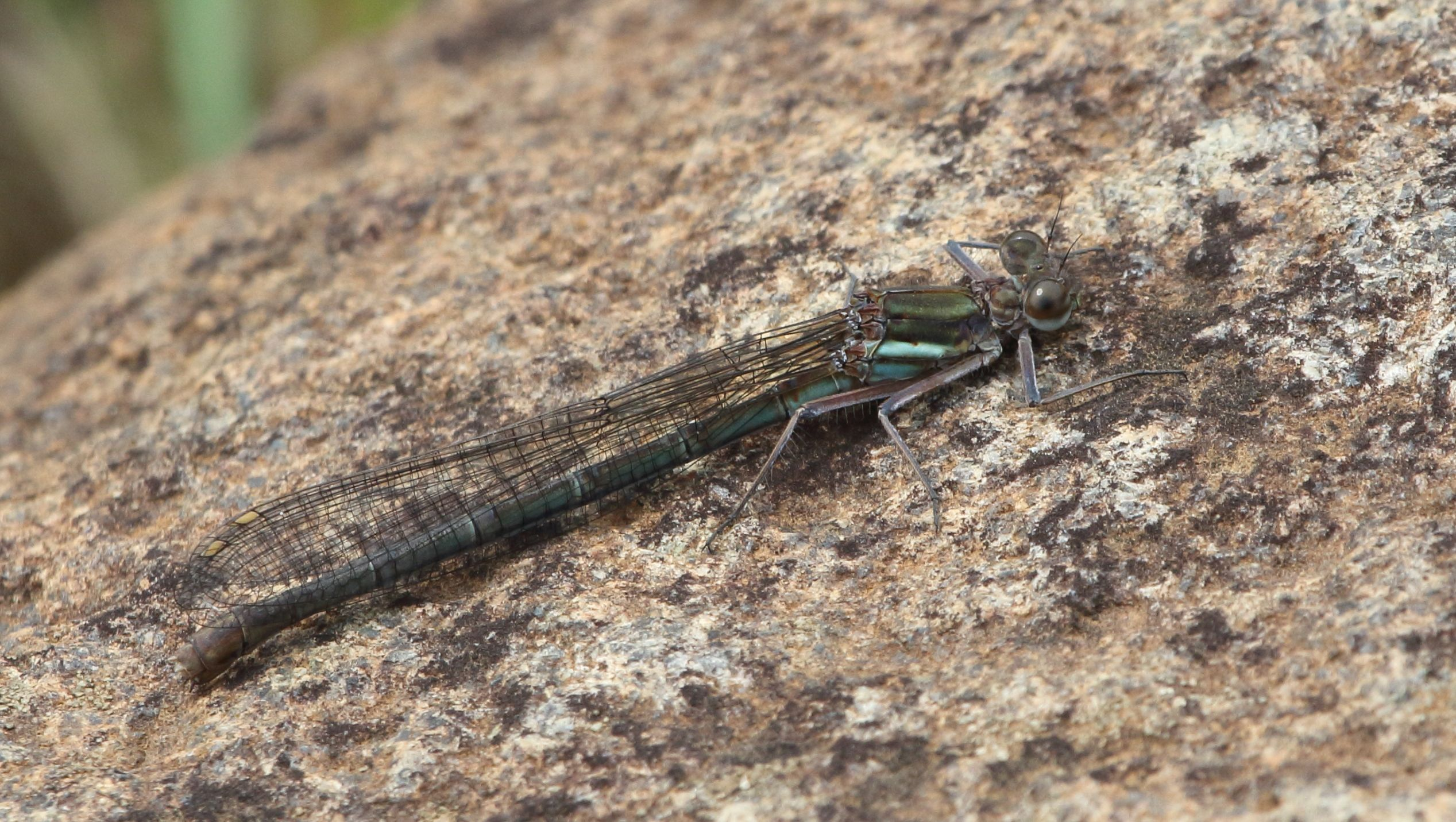
Immature Female

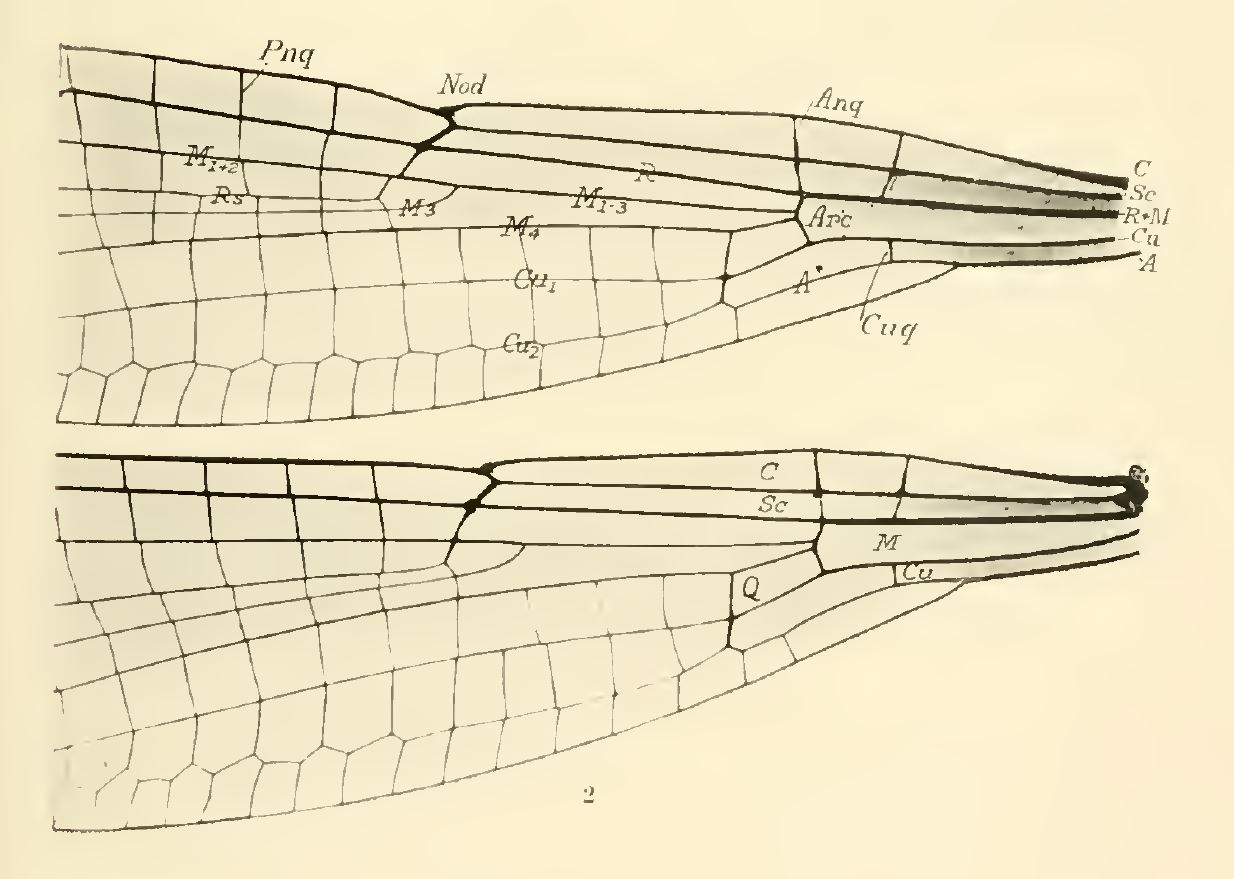
Wing venation details
