= Proplatycnemis agrioides =

Conservation status
- Near Threatened (IUCN 3.1)

Scientific classification
- Kingdom: Animalia
- Phylum: Arthropoda
- Clade: Pancrustacea
- Class: Insecta
- Order: Odonata
- Suborder: Zygoptera
- Family: Platycnemididae
- Genus: Proplatycnemis
- Species: P. agrioides

Binomial name
- Proplatycnemis agrioides (Ris, 1915)

Species of damselfly

Proplatycnemis agrioides is a species of damselfly in the family Platycnemididae. It is endemic to Mayotte. Its natural habitats are subtropical or tropical moist lowland forests and rivers. It is threatened by habitat loss.
