= Cyanocnemis =

Conservation status
- Data Deficient (IUCN 3.1)

Scientific classification
- Kingdom: Animalia
- Phylum: Arthropoda
- Clade: Pancrustacea
- Class: Insecta
- Order: Odonata
- Suborder: Zygoptera
- Family: Platycnemididae
- Subfamily: Idiocnemidinae
- Genus: Cyanocnemis; Lieftinck, 1949
- Species: C. aureofrons

Binomial name
- Cyanocnemis aureofrons Lieftinck, 1949

Genus of damselflies

Cyanocnemis is a monotypic genus of damselflies in the family Platycnemididae containing the single species Cyanocnemis aureofrons. This species is endemic to Indonesia, where it is known only from the 1939 type collections made in what is now the province of Papua on the island of New Guinea.

Male specimens measure up to 3.5 centimeters in length with a hindwing up to 2.6 centimeters long. Males are deep blue with a bright orange face. Female specimens are up to 3.3 centimeters long with a hindwing up to 2.6 centimeters in length. This species is distinguished from others in its family by the pattern of cells on the wing.

This species has only been seen at one location several decades ago, but it was reported to be very common there at the time. Its current status is unknown.
