= Rhyacocnemis =

Scientific classification
- Kingdom: Animalia
- Phylum: Arthropoda
- Clade: Pancrustacea
- Class: Insecta
- Order: Odonata
- Suborder: Zygoptera
- Family: Platycnemididae
- Subfamily: Idiocnemidinae
- Genus: Rhyacocnemis; Lieftinck, 1956

Genus of damselflies

Rhyacocnemis is a genus of white-legged damselfly in the family Platycnemididae. There are at least four described species in Rhyacocnemis.

== Species ==
These four species belong to the genus Rhyacocnemis:

- Rhyacocnemis gassmanni Orr, Richards & Toko, 2019
- Rhyacocnemis leonorae (Lieftinck, 1949)
- Rhyacocnemis prothoracica Lieftinck, 1987
- Rhyacocnemis sufficiens Lieftinck, 1956
