= Stenocnemis =

Scientific classification
- Domain: Eukaryota
- Kingdom: Animalia
- Phylum: Arthropoda
- Class: Insecta
- Order: Odonata
- Suborder: Zygoptera
- Family: Platycnemididae
- Subfamily: Allocnemidinae
- Genus: Stenocnemis; Karsch, 1899
- Species: S. pachystigma

Binomial name
- Stenocnemis pachystigma (Selys, 1886)

Genus of damselflies

Stenocnemis is a genus of white-legged damselfly in the family Platycnemididae. There is one described species in Stenocnemis, S. pachystigma.
