= Idiocnemis =

Scientific classification
- Kingdom: Animalia
- Phylum: Arthropoda
- Class: Insecta
- Order: Odonata
- Suborder: Zygoptera
- Family: Platycnemididae
- Subfamily: Idiocnemidinae
- Genus: Idiocnemis; Selys, 1878

Species
- about 20, see text

Genus of damselflies

Idiocnemis is a genus of damselflies in the family Platycnemididae. They are distributed on New Guinea and the surrounding islands. There are 20 species.

The genus is divided into two groups. The Idiocnemis inornata group are mainly reddish brown in color with turquoise markings. The Idiocnemis bidentata group are brown to black with purple, blue, turquoise, or yellow markings. The groups can also be distinguished by the shape of the penis.

== Species ==
Species include:

- Idiocnemis adelbertensis
- Idiocnemis australis
- Idiocnemis bidentata
- Idiocnemis chloropleura
- Idiocnemis dagnyae
- Idiocnemis fissidens
- Idiocnemis govermasensis
- Idiocnemis huonensis
- Idiocnemis inaequidens
- Idiocnemis inornata
- Idiocnemis kimminsi
- Idiocnemis leonardi
- Idiocnemis louisiadensis
- Idiocnemis mertoni
- Idiocnemis nigriventris
- Idiocnemis obliterata
- Idiocnemis patriciae
- Idiocnemis polhemi
- Idiocnemis pruinescens
- Idiocnemis strumidens
- Idiocnemis zebrina
