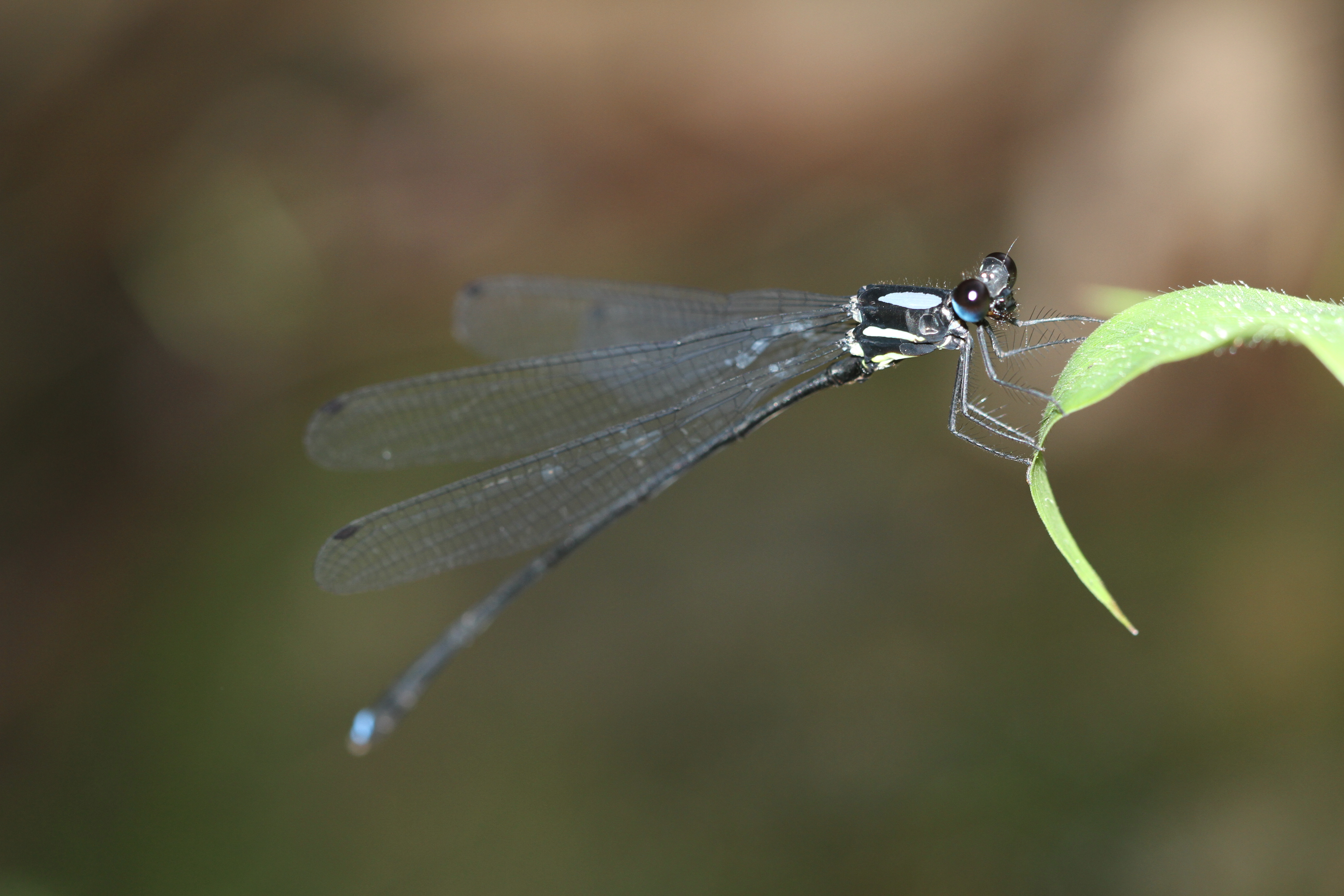
- Indocnemis orang

Scientific classification
- Kingdom: Animalia
- Phylum: Arthropoda
- Class: Insecta
- Order: Odonata
- Suborder: Zygoptera
- Family: Platycnemididae
- Subfamily: Calicnemiinae
- Genus: Indocnemis; Laidlaw, 1917

= Indocnemis =

Genus of damselflies

Indocnemis is a genus of white-legged damselfly in the family Platycnemididae. There are at least three described species in Indocnemis.

== Species ==
These three species belong to the genus Indocnemis:

- Indocnemis ambigua (Asahina, 1997)
- Indocnemis marijanmatoki Phan, 2018
- Indocnemis orang (Förster in Laidlaw, 1907)
