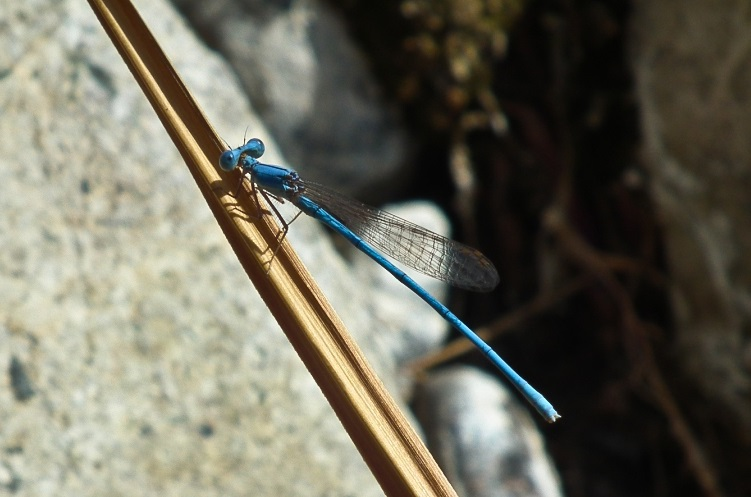

Conservation status
- Least Concern (IUCN 3.1)

Scientific classification
- Kingdom: Animalia
- Phylum: Arthropoda
- Class: Insecta
- Order: Odonata
- Suborder: Zygoptera
- Family: Platycnemididae
- Subfamily: Allocnemidinae
- Genus: Arabicnemis
- Species: A. caerulea

Binomial name
- Arabicnemis caerulea Waterston, 1984

= Arabicnemis =

Genus of damselflies

Arabicnemis is a monotypic genus of damselflies in the family Platycnemididae containing the single species Arabicnemis caerulea. It is known commonly as the powder blue damselfly. It is endemic to the Arabian Peninsula, where it occurs in Oman, the United Arab Emirates, and Yemen.

This insect lives in wadis with bodies of freshwater. It can also be found in agricultural areas, where it lives in irrigation systems.
