= Lieftinckia =

Scientific classification
- Domain: Eukaryota
- Kingdom: Animalia
- Phylum: Arthropoda
- Class: Insecta
- Order: Odonata
- Suborder: Zygoptera
- Family: Platycnemididae
- Subfamily: Idiocnemidinae
- Genus: Lieftinckia; Kimmins, 1957

Genus of damselflies

Lieftinckia is a genus of white-legged damselfly in the family Platycnemididae. There are about seven described species in Lieftinckia.

== Species ==
These seven species belong to the genus Lieftinckia:

- Lieftinckia isabellae Lieftinck, 1987
- Lieftinckia kimminsi Lieftinck, 1963
- Lieftinckia lairdi Lieftinck, 1963
- Lieftinckia malaitae Lieftinck, 1987
- Lieftinckia ramosa Lieftinck, 1987
- Lieftinckia salomonis Kimmins, 1957
- Lieftinckia ulunorum Marinov, 2016
