= Idiocnemis bidentata =

Conservation status
- Least Concern (IUCN 3.1)

Scientific classification
- Kingdom: Animalia
- Phylum: Arthropoda
- Clade: Pancrustacea
- Class: Insecta
- Order: Odonata
- Suborder: Zygoptera
- Family: Platycnemididae
- Genus: Idiocnemis
- Species: I. bidentata

Binomial name
- Idiocnemis bidentata Selys, 1878

Species of damselfly

Idiocnemis bidentata is a species of damselfly in the family Platycnemididae. It is endemic to Indonesia, where it is known only from the province of Papua on the island of New Guinea. It is mostly limited to the Bird's Head Peninsula.

Males of the species have an abdomen up to 3.4 centimeters long; the females are slightly smaller. Males are brown to black in color with yellow markings and females are similar in color.

Little is known about the biology of the species.
