= Paracnemis =

Scientific classification
- Kingdom: Animalia
- Phylum: Arthropoda
- Class: Insecta
- Order: Odonata
- Suborder: Zygoptera
- Family: Platycnemididae
- Subfamily: Onychargiinae
- Genus: Paracnemis; Martin, 1902

Genus of damselflies

Paracnemis is a genus of white-legged damselfly in the family Platycnemididae. There are at least two described species in Paracnemis.

== Species ==
These two species belong to the genus Paracnemis:

- Paracnemis alluaudi Martin, 1903
- Paracnemis secundaris (Aguesse, 1968)
