= Paramecocnemis =

Scientific classification
- Kingdom: Animalia
- Phylum: Arthropoda
- Clade: Pancrustacea
- Class: Insecta
- Order: Odonata
- Suborder: Zygoptera
- Family: Platycnemididae
- Subfamily: Idiocnemidinae
- Genus: Paramecocnemis; Lieftinck, 1932

Genus of damselflies

Paramecocnemis is a genus of white-legged damselfly in the family Platycnemididae. There are about five described species in Paramecocnemis.

== Species ==
These five species belong to the genus Paramecocnemis:

- Paramecocnemis eos Orr, Kalkman & Richards, 2012
- Paramecocnemis erythrostigma Lieftinck, 1932
- Paramecocnemis similis Orr, Kalkman & Richards, 2012
- Paramecocnemis spinosa Orr, Kalkman & Richards, 2012
- Paramecocnemis stillacruoris Lieftinck, 1956
