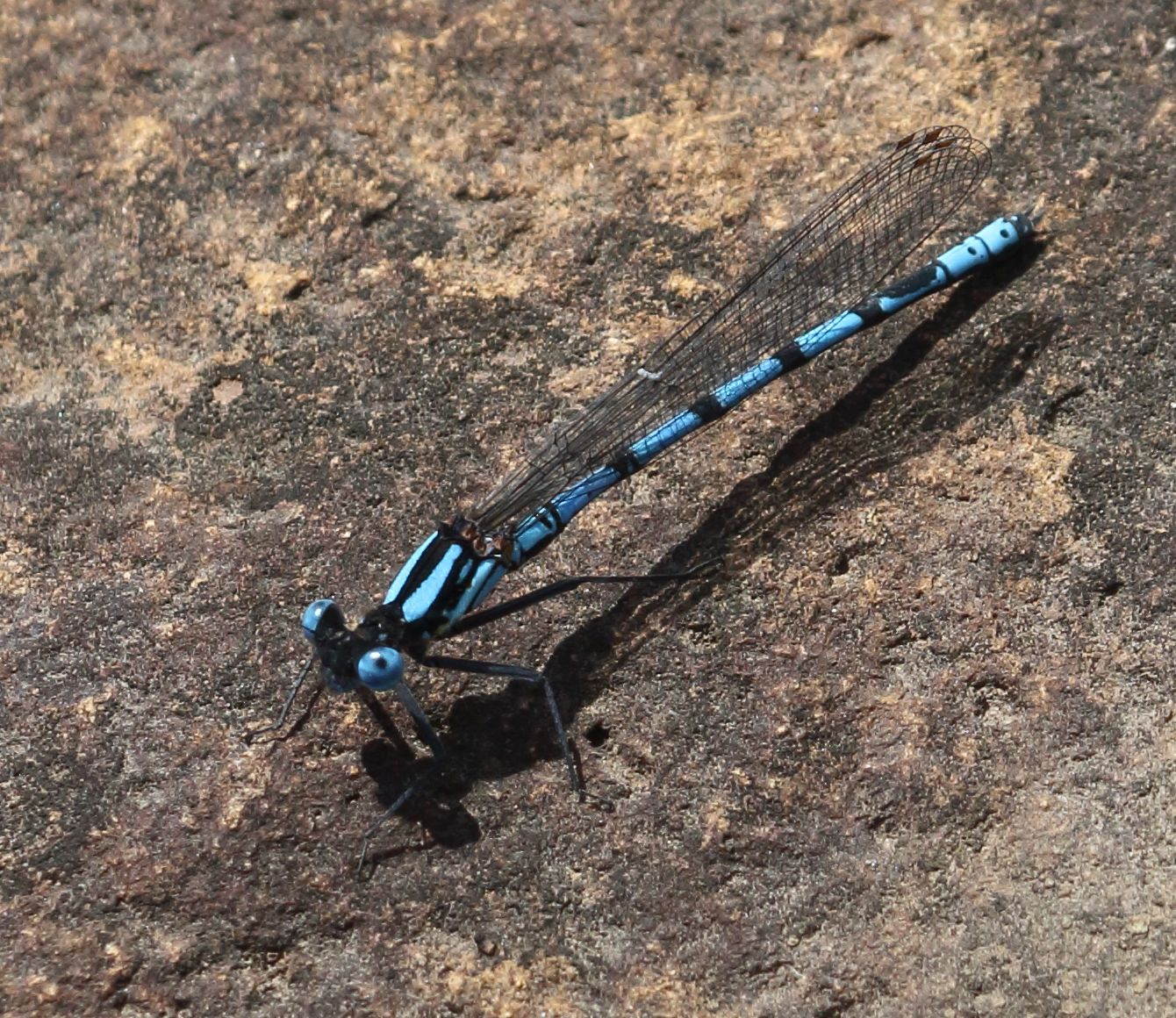
- Metacnemis valida

Scientific classification
- Kingdom: Animalia
- Phylum: Arthropoda
- Clade: Pancrustacea
- Class: Insecta
- Order: Odonata
- Suborder: Zygoptera
- Family: Platycnemididae
- Subfamily: Allocnemidinae; Dijkstra, Kalkman, Dow, Stokvis & van Tol, 2014

= Allocnemidinae =

Subfamily of damselflies

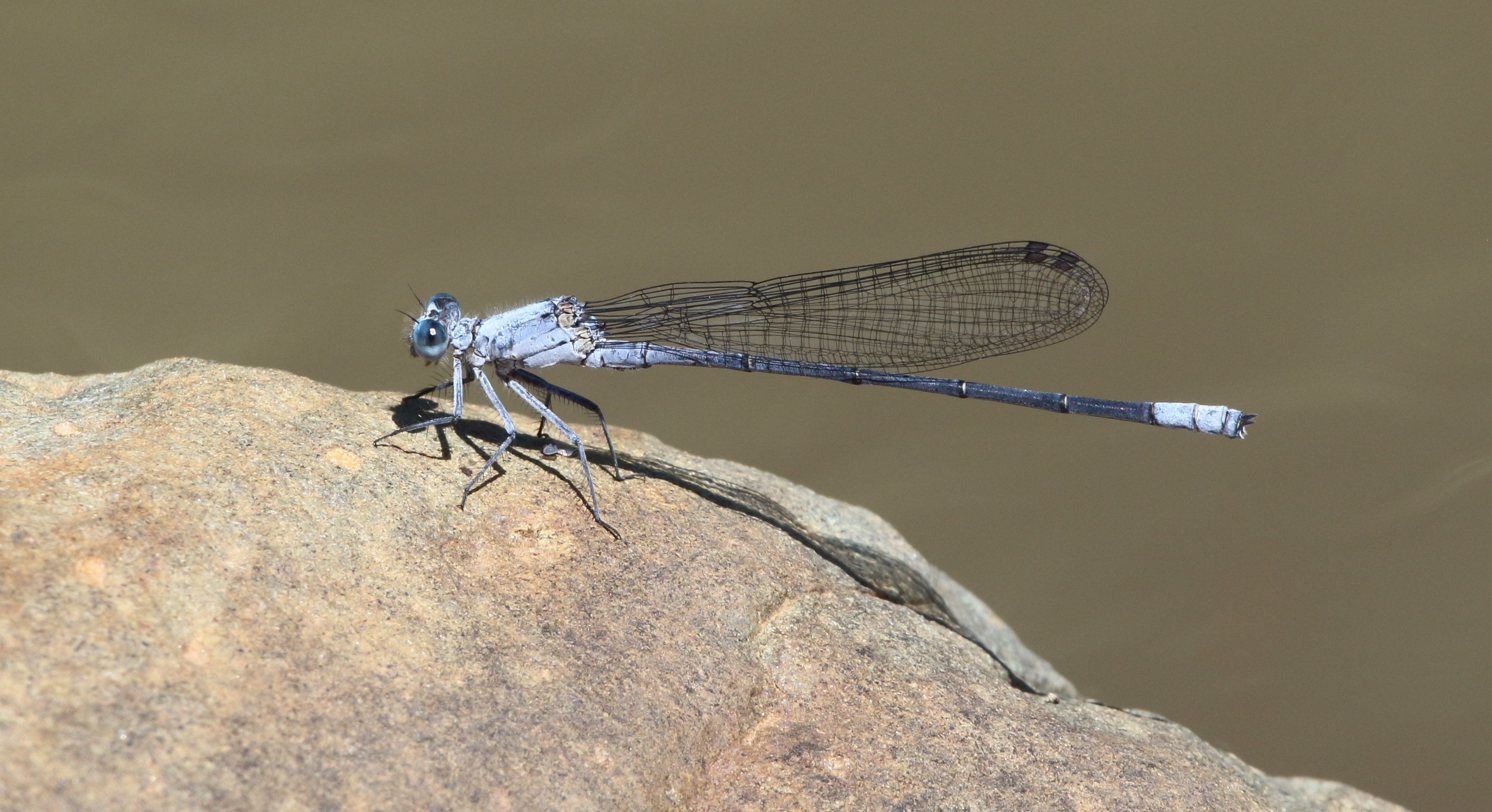
Mesocnemis singularis

Allocnemidinae is a subfamily of damselflies in the family Platycnemididae. There are 5 genera in Allocnemidinae, found in Africa and Arabia.

The subfamily Allocnemidinae was defined by Dijkstra, et al., in 2014, as a result of a comprehensive phylogenetic study of the damselfly families.

== Genera ==
These five genera belong to the subfamily Allocnemidinae:

- Allocnemis Selys, 1863
- Arabicnemis Waterston, 1984
- Mesocnemis Karsch, 1891
- Metacnemis Hagen, 1863
- Stenocnemis Karsch, 1899
