= Idiocnemidinae =

Scientific classification
- Kingdom: Animalia
- Phylum: Arthropoda
- Clade: Pancrustacea
- Class: Insecta
- Order: Odonata
- Suborder: Zygoptera
- Family: Platycnemididae
- Subfamily: Idiocnemidinae; Dijkstra, Kalkman, Dow, Stokvis & van Tol, 2014

Genera
- Archboldargia; Arrhenocnemis; Cyanocnemis; Hylaeargia; Idiocnemis; Igneocnemis; Lieftinckia; Lochmaeocnemis; Macrocnemis; Palaiargia; Papuargia; Paramecocnemis; Rhyacocnemis; Risiocnemis; Salomocnemis; Torrenticnemis

Subfamily of damselflies

Idiocnemidinae is a subfamily of damselflies in the family Platycnemididae. World Odonata List places 16 genera and 121 species in the subfamily.

== Taxonomic history ==
Dijkstra and colleagues established Idiocnemidinae in 2014, with Idiocnemis as its type genus. Their classification brought together genera from New Guinea and nearby islands that had previously been placed in different groups.
