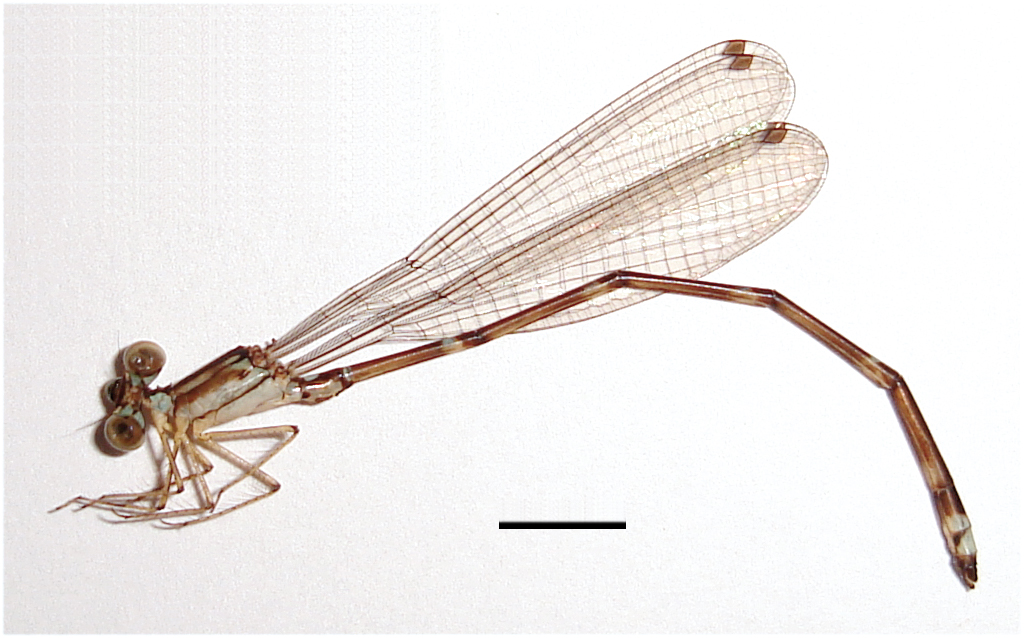
- Asthenocnemis linnaei

Scientific classification
- Kingdom: Animalia
- Phylum: Arthropoda
- Clade: Pancrustacea
- Class: Insecta
- Order: Odonata
- Suborder: Zygoptera
- Family: Platycnemididae
- Subfamily: Calicnemiinae
- Genus: Asthenocnemis; Lieftinck, 1949

= Asthenocnemis =

Genus of damselflies

Asthenocnemis is a genus of white-legged damselfly in the family Platycnemididae. There are at least two described species in Asthenocnemis.

== Species ==
These two species belong to the genus Asthenocnemis:

- Asthenocnemis linnaei Gassmann & Hämäläinen, 2008
- Asthenocnemis stephanodera Lieftinck, 1949
