= Torrenticnemis =

Scientific classification
- Kingdom: Animalia
- Phylum: Arthropoda
- Clade: Pancrustacea
- Class: Insecta
- Order: Odonata
- Suborder: Zygoptera
- Family: Platycnemididae
- Subfamily: Idiocnemidinae
- Genus: Torrenticnemis; Lieftinck, 1949
- Species: T. filicornis

Binomial name
- Torrenticnemis filicornis Lieftinck, 1949

Genus of damselflies

Torrenticnemis is a genus of white-legged damselfly in the family Platycnemididae. There is one described species in Torrenticnemis, T. filicornis.
