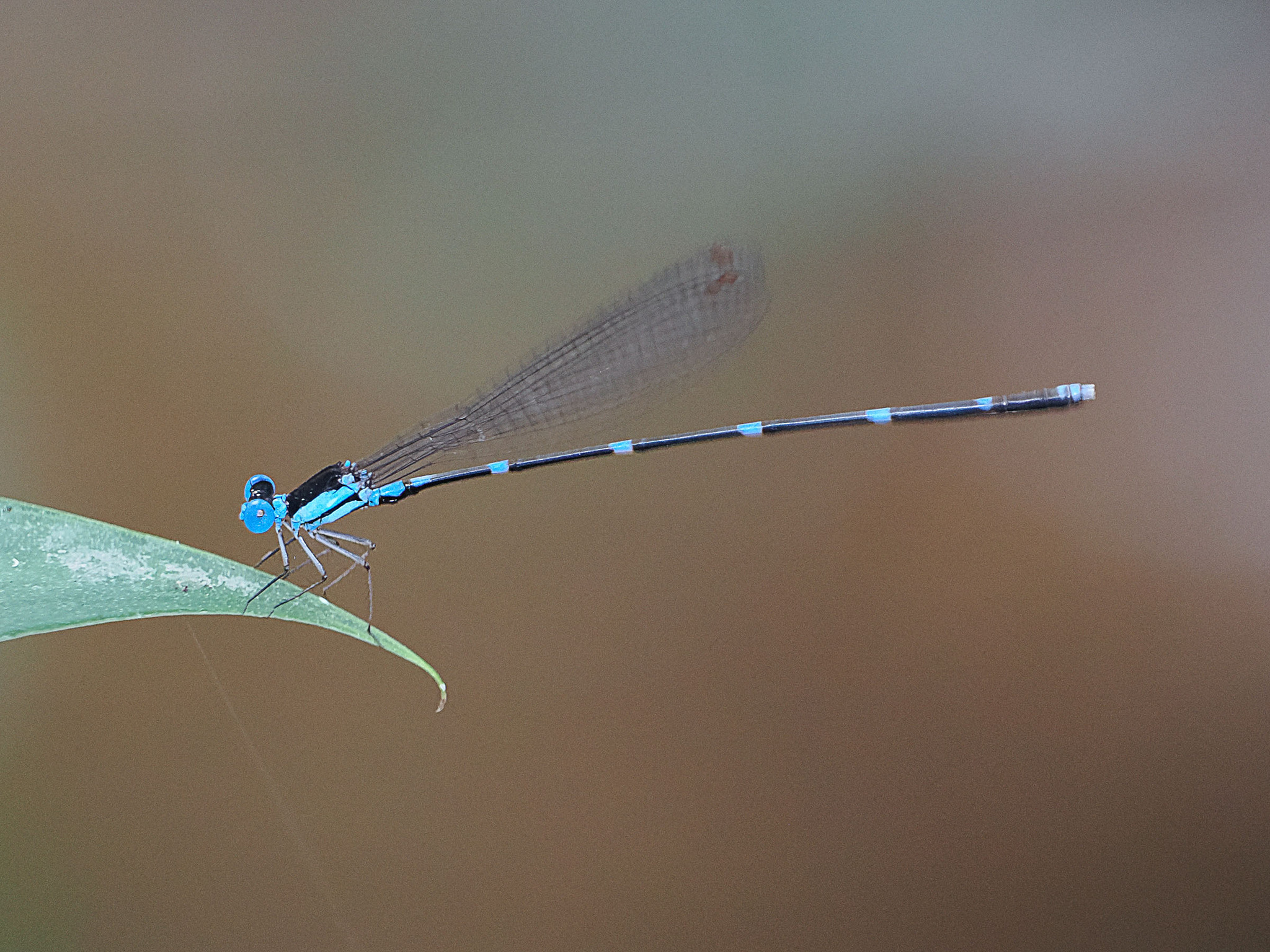
- Risiocnemis pulchra
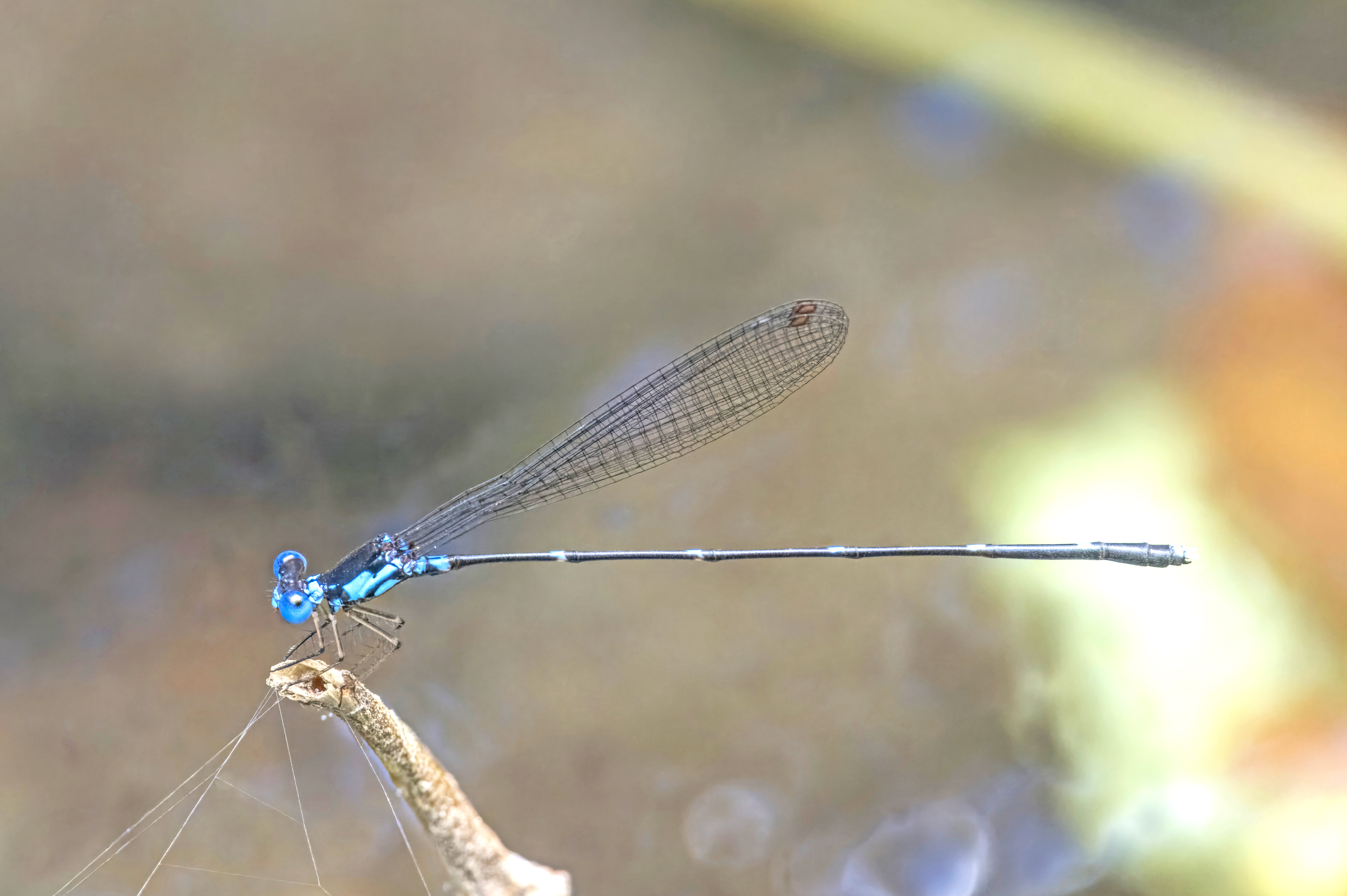
- Risiocnemis serrata, male, Philippines

Scientific classification
- Kingdom: Animalia
- Phylum: Arthropoda
- Clade: Pancrustacea
- Class: Insecta
- Order: Odonata
- Suborder: Zygoptera
- Family: Platycnemididae
- Genus: Risiocnemis; Cowley, 1934

= Risiocnemis =

Genus of damselflies

Risiocnemis is a genus of damselflies in the family Platycnemididae. The damselflies are endemic to the Philippine archipelago and are inhabit the vicinity of shady rainforest streams.

Species accepted by the World Odonata List as of November 2023:

- Risiocnemis appendiculata (Brauer, 1868)
- Risiocnemis arator Hämäläinen, 1991
- Risiocnemis asahinai Kitagawa, 1990
- Risiocnemis confusa Hämäläinen, 1991
- Risiocnemis corbeti Villanueva, 2009
- Risiocnemis elegans Kitagawa, 1990
- Risiocnemis erythrura (Brauer, 1868)
- Risiocnemis gracilis Hämäläinen, 1991
- Risiocnemis hamalaineni Villanueva, 2009
- Risiocnemis kiautai Hämäläinen, 1991
- Risiocnemis laguna Hämäläinen, 1991
- Risiocnemis moroensis Hämäläinen, 1991
- Risiocnemis praeusta Hämäläinen, 1991
- Risiocnemis pulchra Hämäläinen, 1991
- Risiocnemis rolandmuelleri Hämäläinen, 1991
- Risiocnemis seidenschwarzi Hämäläinen, 2000
- Risiocnemis serrata (Hagen in Selys, 1863)
- Risiocnemis varians Hämäläinen, 1991
