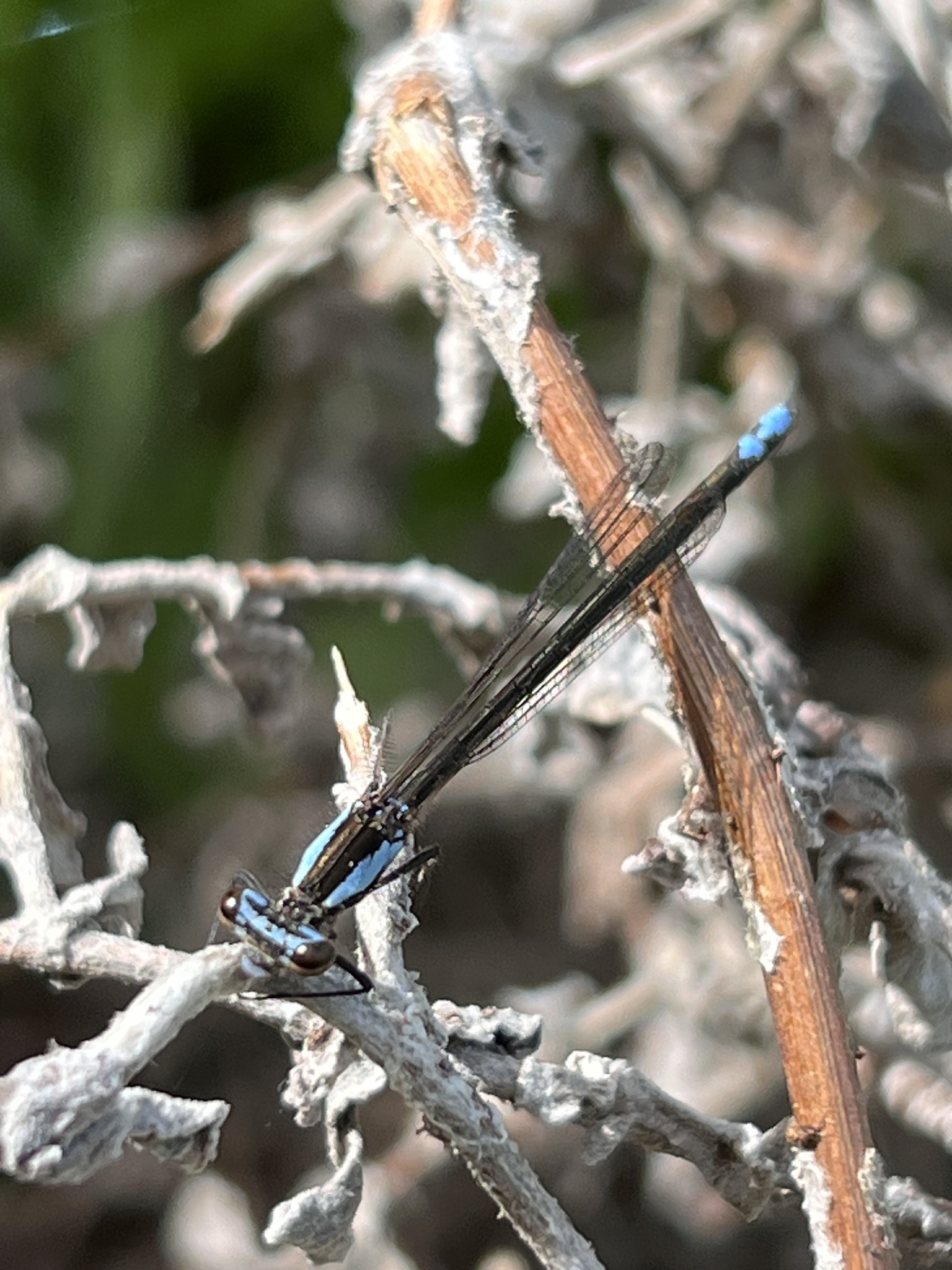
- Adult Spesbona angusta photographed in Helderberg Nature Reserve

Conservation status
- Endangered (IUCN 3.1)

Scientific classification
- Kingdom: Animalia
- Phylum: Arthropoda
- Clade: Pancrustacea
- Class: Insecta
- Order: Odonata
- Suborder: Zygoptera
- Family: Platycnemididae
- Subfamily: Platycnemidinae
- Genus: Spesbona; Dijkstra, 2013
- Species: S. angusta

Binomial name
- Spesbona angusta (Selys, 1863)

Synonyms
- Metacnemis angusta Selys, 1863

= Spesbona =

Genus of damselflies

Spesbona is a monotypic genus of damselflies in the family Platycnemididae containing only the species Spesbona angusta, commonly known as the spesbona, Ceres featherlegs, Ceres stream-damsel, or Ceres streamjack. It is an endangered species endemic to the Western Cape Province of South Africa.

== Taxonomy and history ==
This species was first described as Metacnemis angusta by Edmond de Sélys Longchamps in 1863 based on a female type specimen that is now thought to be lost. A second specimen, also female, was collected in 1920 near Ceres, but the species would not be seen again until 2003, when a population was discovered in the Dutoitsrivier valley. A description of the male and redescription of the female from the newly discovered population was published in 2006. In 2013, Klaas-Douwe Dijkstra erected the new genus Spesbona for this species, combining it as Spesbona angusta and placing it in the tribe Coperini within the subfamily Platycnemidinae. It is the only species in the genus.

== Distribution and habitat ==
Spesbona angusta is restricted to the south west Western Cape Province at around 400 m (1,300 ft) above sea level. Though initially known from Ceres, it has not been recorded there since 1920 due to habitat degradation. It is now known only from around Dutoitsrivier, near Villiersdorp, where it can be found near pools in braided rivers and streams surrounded by fynbos vegetation and populated with floating Aponogeton plants.

== Description ==
Adult Spesbona angusta are very small, slender damselflies measuring around 28–30 mm (1.1–1.2 in) long with a 35–38 mm (1.4–1.5 in) wingspan. They are sexually dichromatic and exhibit different colouration depending on the ambient temperature. Males are uniformly matte black when cold but gain increasingly bright patches of blue, ranging from grey to azure to mauve, on the head, thorax, and abdomen as the temperature rises. Females are uniformly dull brownish-grey when cold, but develop brighter patches on parts of the head and thorax as the temperature rises.

== Ecology ==
Adult Spesbona angusta are active on the wing from November to February but typically stay close to water. Males fly actively over the surface of the water but regularly perch horizontally on twigs and stems. Females often fly over the water alongside males, but also perch in bushes or on grass some metres from the water.

== Conservation status ==
Spesbona angusta is listed as endangered on the International Union for the Conservation of Nature Red List under criteria B2ab(ii) and D, as it is currently known from only one population. It was previously assessed as data deficient in 1996 and vulnerable in 2007 and 2010. Thought to be possibly extinct until its rediscovery in 2003, it is no longer present at the type locality in Ceres due to over-extraction of water for the fruit industry. It is threatened by the construction of dams, invasive plants such as Acacia mearnsii, and invasive fish such as the rainbow trout (Onycorhynchus mykiss).
