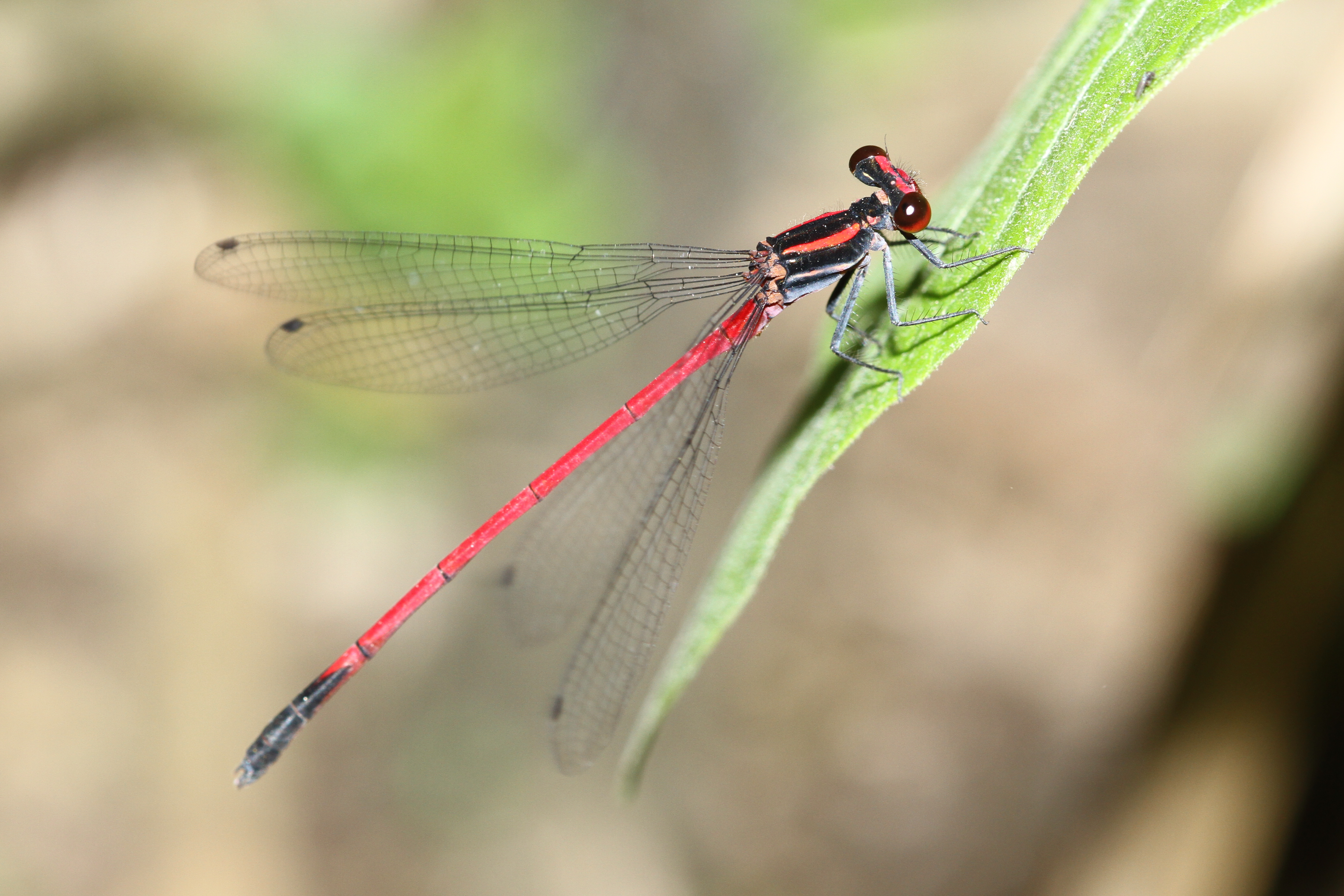
- Calicnemia miniata

Scientific classification
- Kingdom: Animalia
- Phylum: Arthropoda
- Class: Insecta
- Order: Odonata
- Suborder: Zygoptera
- Family: Platycnemididae
- Genus: Calicnemia; Strand, 1928

Species
- See text

= Calicnemia =

Genus of damselflies

Calicnemia is a genus of damselflies in the family Platycnemididae. There are over 20 species distributed in Southeast Asia, China, India, and Pakistan.

Species include:

- Calicnemia chaoi
- Calicnemia chaseni
- Calicnemia doonensis
- Calicnemia erythromelas
- Calicnemia eximia
- Calicnemia fortis
- Calicnemia gulinensis
- Calicnemia haksik
- Calicnemia imitans
- Calicnemia miles
- Calicnemia miniata
- Calicnemia mortoni
- Calicnemia mukherjeei
- Calicnemia nipalica
- Calicnemia porcata
- Calicnemia pulverulans
- Calicnemia rectangulata
- Calicnemia sinensis
- Calicnemia soccifera
- Calicnemia sudhaae
- Calicnemia uenoi
- Calicnemia zhuae
