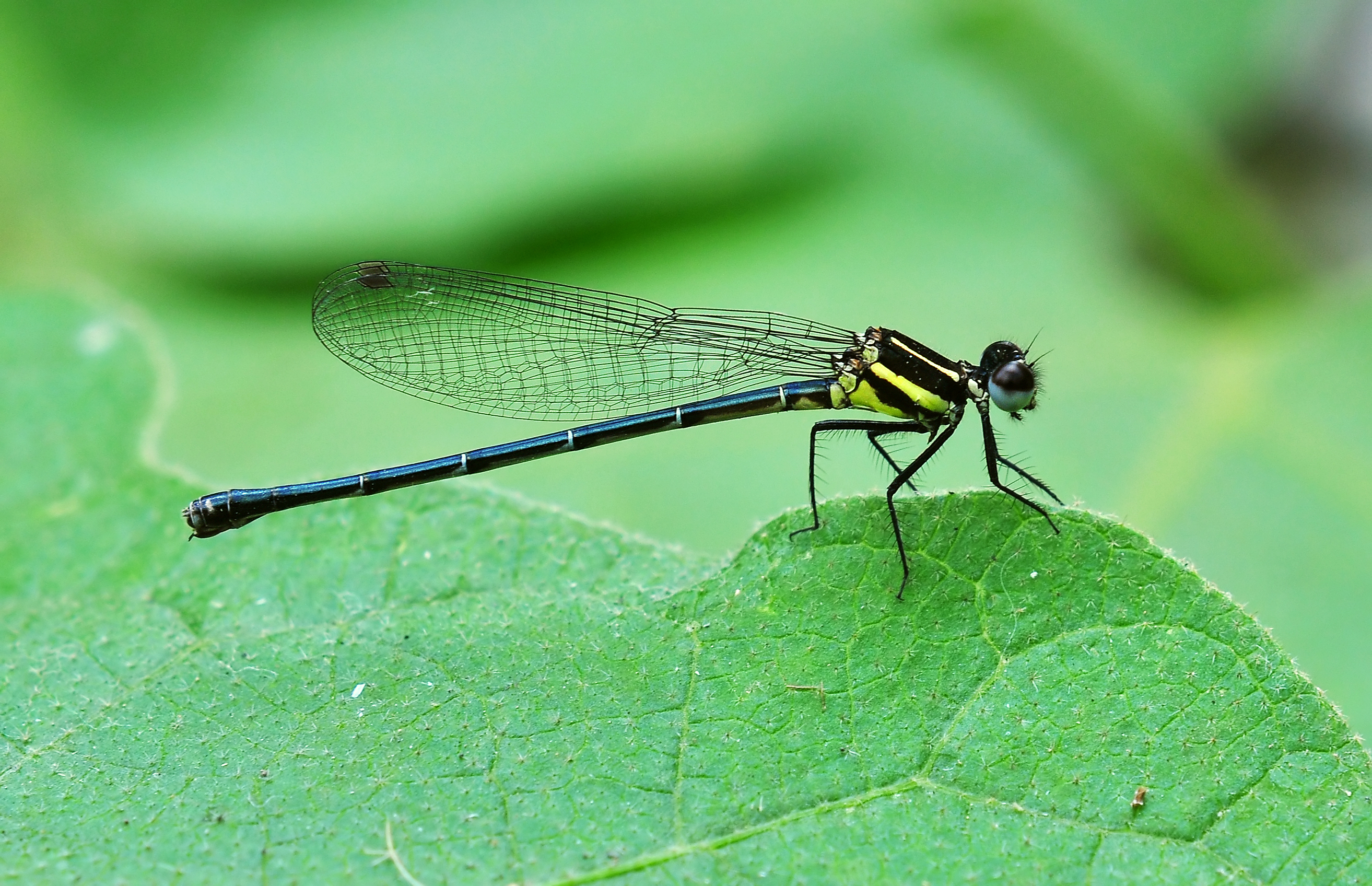
- Onychargia atrocyana

Scientific classification
- Kingdom: Animalia
- Phylum: Arthropoda
- Class: Insecta
- Order: Odonata
- Suborder: Zygoptera
- Superfamily: Coenagrionoidea
- Family: Platycnemididae
- Genus: Onychargia; Selys, 1865

= Onychargia =

Genus of damselflies

External image
- Images at iNaturalist

Onychargia is a genus of damselflies in the family Platycnemididae, erected by Edmond de Sélys Longchamps in 1865. Species have been recorded from India, Sri Lanka, China, Taiwan, Indochina and western Malesia including Borneo.

== Species ==
The Global Biodiversity Information Facility includes:

1. Onychargia atrocyana Selys, 1865
2. Onychargia priydak Kosterin, 2015
