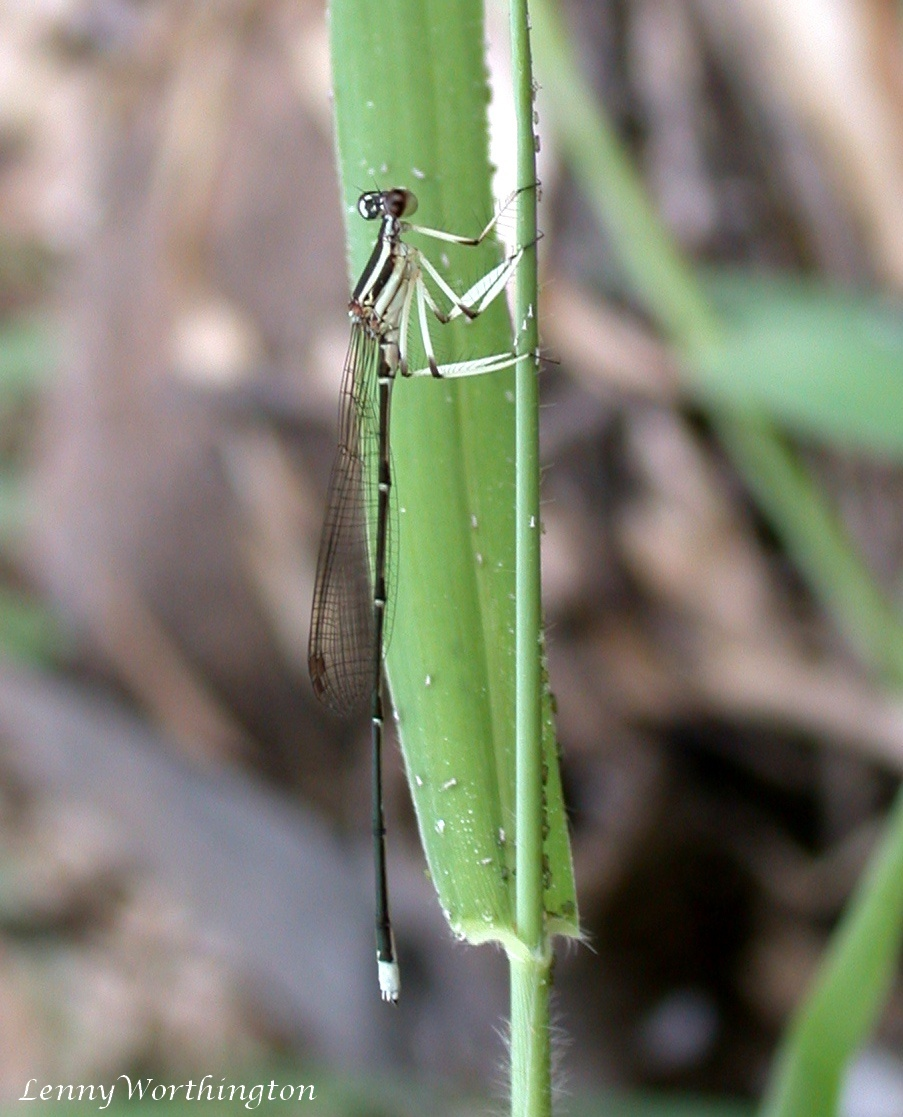
- Pseudocopera ciliata

Scientific classification
- Kingdom: Animalia
- Phylum: Arthropoda
- Class: Insecta
- Order: Odonata
- Suborder: Zygoptera
- Superfamily: Coenagrionoidea
- Family: Platycnemididae
- Genus: Pseudocopera; Fraser, 1922

= Pseudocopera =

Genus of damselflies

Pseudocopera is a genus of damselflies in the family Platycnemididae, erected by Frederic Charles Fraser in 1922. Species have been recorded from Japan, China, Indochina and western Malesia.

== Species ==
The Global Biodiversity Information Facility lists:

1. Pseudocopera annulata (Selys, 1863)
2. Pseudocopera ciliata (Selys, 1863)
3. Pseudocopera rubripes (Navás, 1934)
4. Pseudocopera superplatypes (Fraser, 1927)
