= Proplatycnemis =

Scientific classification
- Kingdom: Animalia
- Phylum: Arthropoda
- Clade: Pancrustacea
- Class: Insecta
- Order: Odonata
- Suborder: Zygoptera
- Family: Platycnemididae
- Genus: Proplatycnemis; Kennedy, 1920

Genus of damselflies

Proplatycnemis is a genus of damselflies in the family Platycnemididae. Species of Proplatycnemis are endemic to Madagascar and nearby islands in the western Indian Ocean.

== Description ==
Members of Proplatycnemis are slender damselflies with broadened tibiae, resembling species of Platycnemis. Adults are typically associated with streams and other freshwater habitats.

== Taxonomic history ==
The genus was established by Kennedy in 1920. Species now placed in Proplatycnemis were historically included in Platycnemis or Psilocnemis. Molecular and morphological studies demonstrated that the Malagasy species form a distinct lineage within the subfamily Platycnemidinae. Dijkstra and colleagues (2014) recognised Proplatycnemis as the appropriate name for this Malagasy radiation.

== Etymology ==
The genus name Proplatycnemis presumably combines the prefix pro- with Platycnemis, reflecting its close relationship to that genus.

== Species ==
The following species are currently placed in Proplatycnemis:

- Proplatycnemis agrioides (Ris, 1915)
- Proplatycnemis alatipes (McLachlan, 1872)
- Proplatycnemis aurantipes (Lieftinck, 1965)
- Proplatycnemis hova (Martin, 1908)
- Proplatycnemis longiventris (Schmidt, 1951)
- Proplatycnemis malgassica (Schmidt, 1951)
- Proplatycnemis melana (Aguesse, 1968)
- Proplatycnemis pallidus (Aguesse, 1968)
- Proplatycnemis pembipes (Dijkstra, Clausnitzer & Martens, 2007)
- Proplatycnemis protostictoides (Fraser, 1953)
- Proplatycnemis pseudalatipes (Schmidt, 1951)
- Proplatycnemis sanguinipes (Schmidt, 1951)
