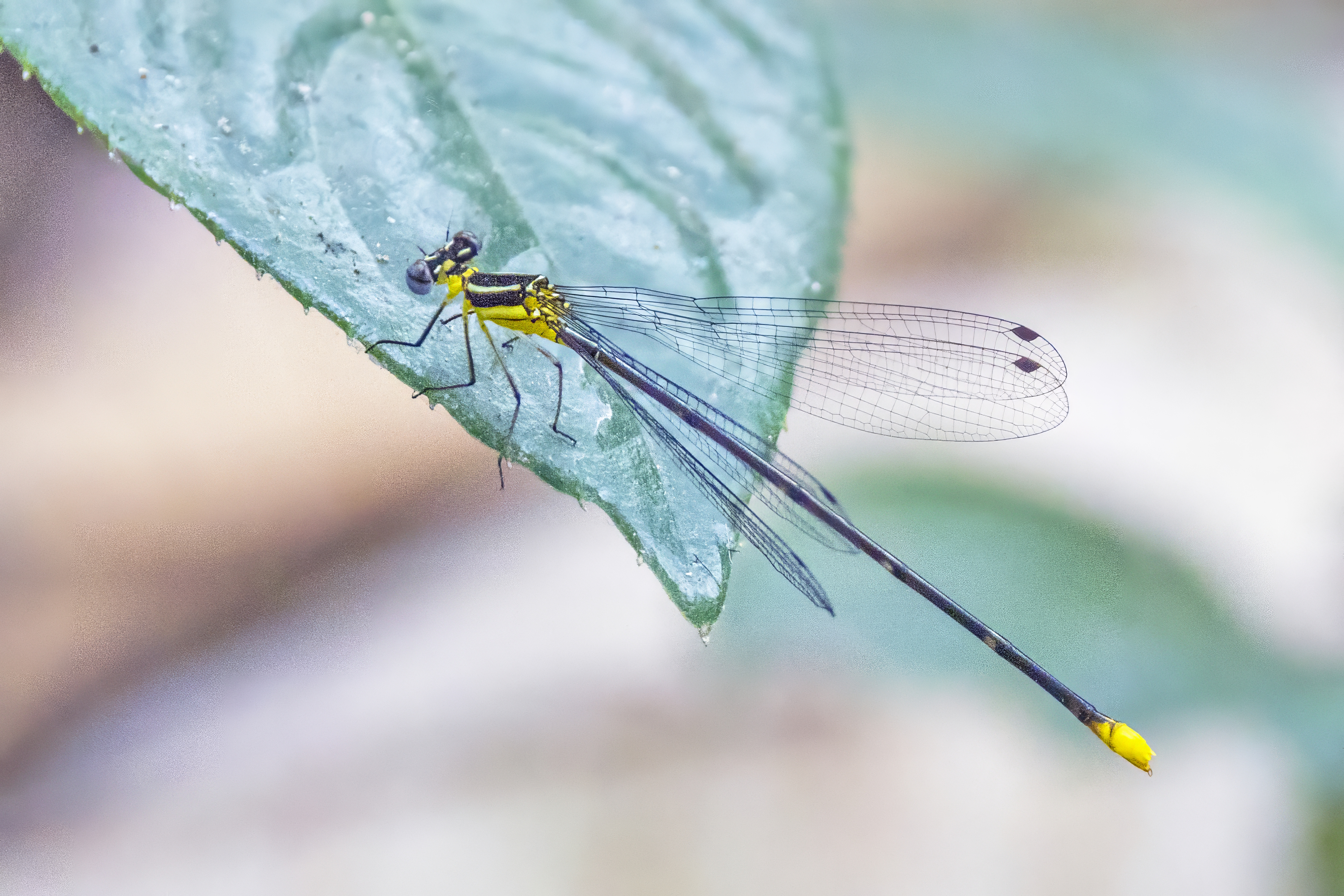
- C. chromothorax, Laos

Scientific classification
- Kingdom: Animalia
- Phylum: Arthropoda
- Clade: Pancrustacea
- Class: Insecta
- Order: Odonata
- Suborder: Zygoptera
- Family: Platycnemididae
- Genus: Coeliccia; Kirby, 1890

Species
- Around 80, see text

= Coeliccia =

Genus of damselflies

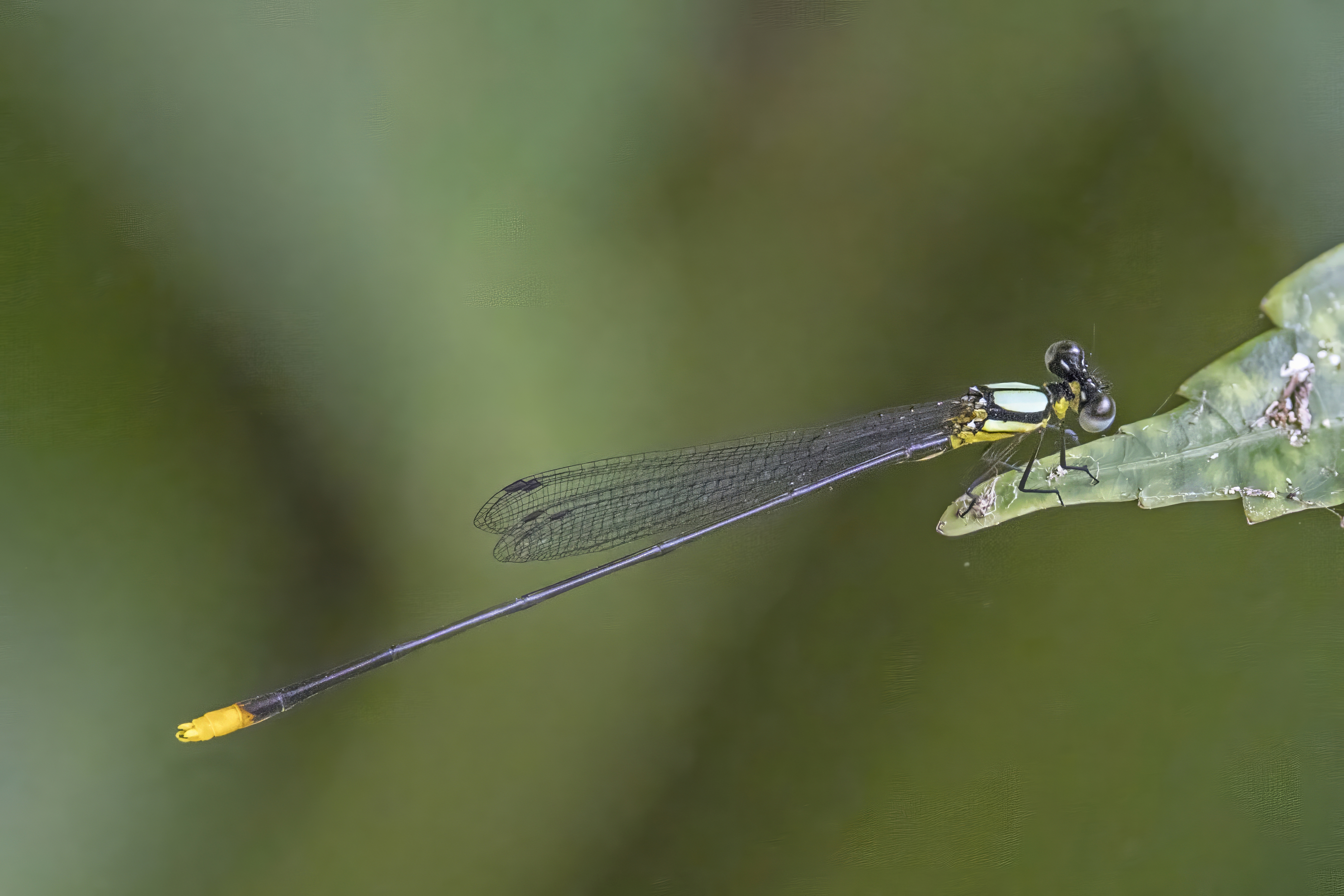
C. poungyi male, Laos

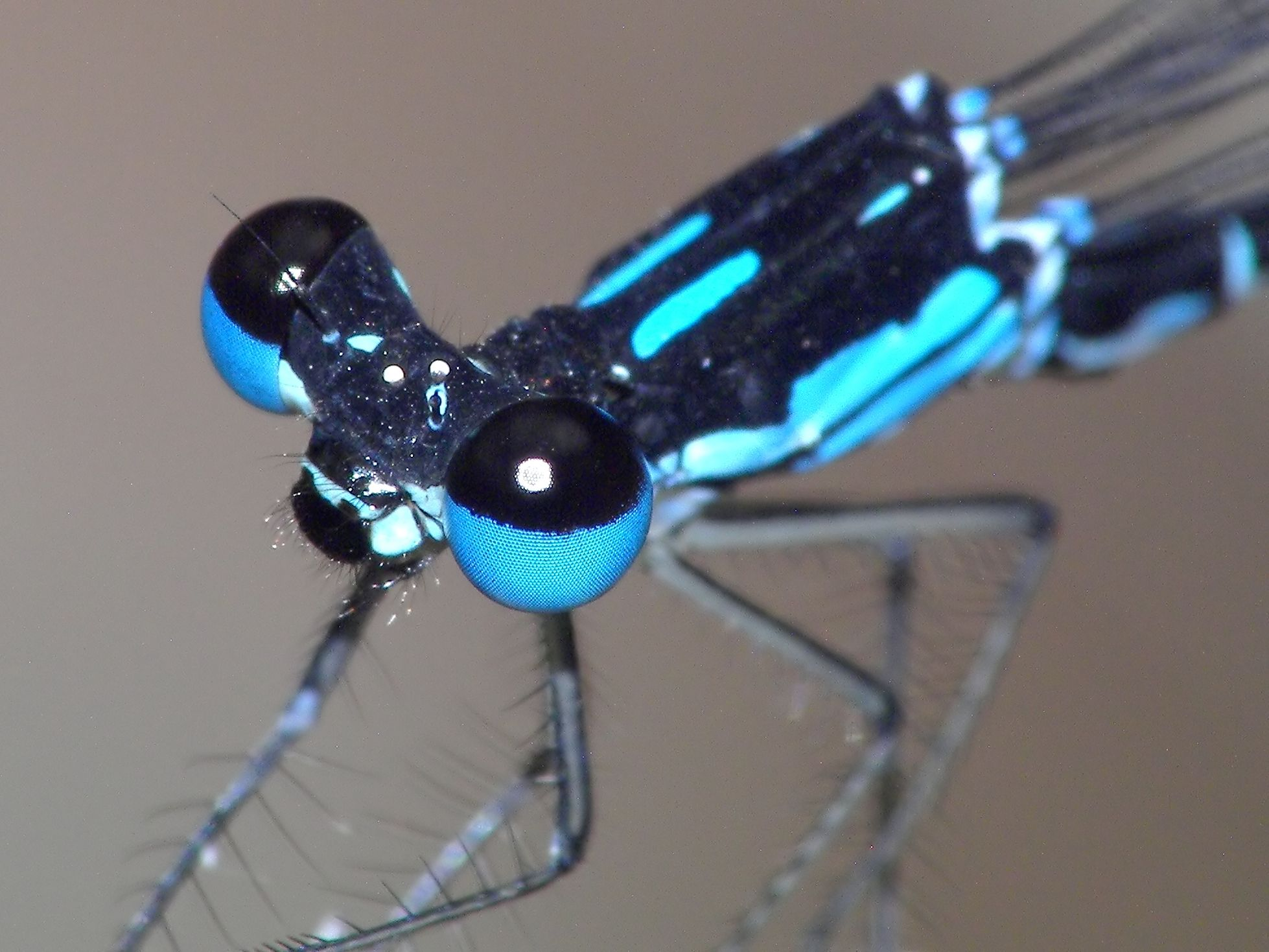
C. cyanomelas

Coeliccia is a genus of damselflies in the family Platycnemididae. They are distributed in Asia from India to Japan to Indonesia. It is the largest genus in the family, with around 80 species.

== Species ==
These are the species currently described in Coeliccia:

- Coeliccia albicauda (Forster, 1907)
- Coeliccia arcuata Lieftinck, 1940
- Coeliccia axinocercus Lieftinck, 1974
- Coeliccia bhriulieci To, Phan & Tran, 2017
- Coeliccia bimaculata Laidlaw, 1914
- Coeliccia boettcheri Schmidt, 1951
- Coeliccia borneensis (Selys, 1886)
- Coeliccia brachysticta Ris,1912
- Coeliccia caerulea Kompier & Steinhoff, 2020
- Coeliccia campioni Laidlaw, 1918
- Coeliccia chromothorax (Selys, 1891)
- Coeliccia coronata Kompier & Steinhoff, 2020
- Coeliccia curua Kompier & Steinhoff, 2020
- Coeliccia cyaneothorax Kimmins, 1936
- Coeliccia cyanomelas Ris, 1912
- Coeliccia didyma (Selys, 1863)
- Coeliccia dinoceras Laidlaw, 1925
- Coeliccia diomedea Kompier & Steinhoff, 2020
- Coeliccia doisuthepensis Asahina, 1984
- Coeliccia dorothea Fraser, 1933
- Coeliccia duytan Phan, 2017
- Coeliccia erici Laidlaw, 1917
- Coeliccia exoleta Lieftinck, 1961
- Coeliccia flavicauda Ris, 1912
- Coeliccia flavostriata Laidlaw, 1918
- Coeliccia fraseri Laidlaw, 1932
- Coeliccia furcata Hämäläinen, 1986
- Coeliccia galbina Wilson & Reels, 2003
- Coeliccia hainanense Laidlaw, 1932
- Coeliccia hayashii Phan & Kompier, 2016
- Coeliccia hoanglienensis Do, 2007
- Coeliccia junis Dow, 2020
- Coeliccia kazukoae Asahina, 1984
- Coeliccia kenyah Dow, 2010
- Coeliccia lecongcoi Phan, 2019
- Coeliccia lephuocdieui Phan, Ngo & Bui, 2020
- Coeliccia lieftincki Laidlaw, 1932
- Coeliccia loogali Fraser in Laidlaw, 1932
- Coeliccia loringae Laidlaw, 1932
- Coeliccia macrostigma Laidlaw, 1918
- Coeliccia matok Dow, 2016
- Coeliccia mattii Phan & Kompier, 2016
- Coeliccia membranipes (Rambur, 1842)
- Coeliccia mientrung Kompier & Phan, 2017
- Coeliccia mingxiensis Xu, 2006
- Coeliccia montana Fraser, 1933
- Coeliccia natgeo Phan, Ngo, Toan & Tuan, 2020
- Coeliccia nemoricola Laidlaw, 1912
- Coeliccia nigrescens Laidlaw, 1931
- Coeliccia nigrohamata Laidlaw, 1918
- Coeliccia octogesima (Selys, 1863)
- Coeliccia palawana Lieftinck, 1940
- Coeliccia paludensis Dow, 2016
- Coeliccia phamiha Phan & Tran, 2018
- Coeliccia poungyi Fraser, 1924
- Coeliccia pulchella Kompier & Steinhoff, 2020
- Coeliccia prakritii Lahiri, 1985
- Coeliccia pyriformis Laidlaw, 1932
- Coeliccia renifera (Selys, 1886)
- Coeliccia resecta Lieftinck, 1953
- Coeliccia roberti Dow, 2020
- Coeliccia rolandorum Kosterin & Kompier, 2017
- Coeliccia rossi Asahina, 1985
- Coeliccia rotundata Asahina, 1984
- Coeliccia sameerae Dow, Choong & Ng, 2018
- Coeliccia sarbottama Lahiri, 1987
- Coeliccia sasamotoi Do, 2011
- Coeliccia satoi Asahina, 1997
- Coeliccia schmidti Asahina, 1984
- Coeliccia schorri Phan & To, 2019
- Coeliccia scutellum Laidlaw, 1932
- Coeliccia sexmaculata Wang, 1994
- Coeliccia simillima Laidlaw, 1917
- Coeliccia southwelli Dow & Reels, 2011
- Coleccia suoitia Dow, 2016
- Coeliccia svihleri Asahina, 1969
- Coeliccia tongbiguan Dow & Zhang, 2020
- Coeliccia uenoi Asahina, 1997
- Coeliccia vacca Laidlaw, 1932
- Coeliccia werneri Lieftinck, 1961
- Coeliccia wilsoni Zhang & Huo, 2011
- Coeliccia yamasakii Asahina, 1984
- Coeliccia yunnanensis Dow & Zhang, 2020
