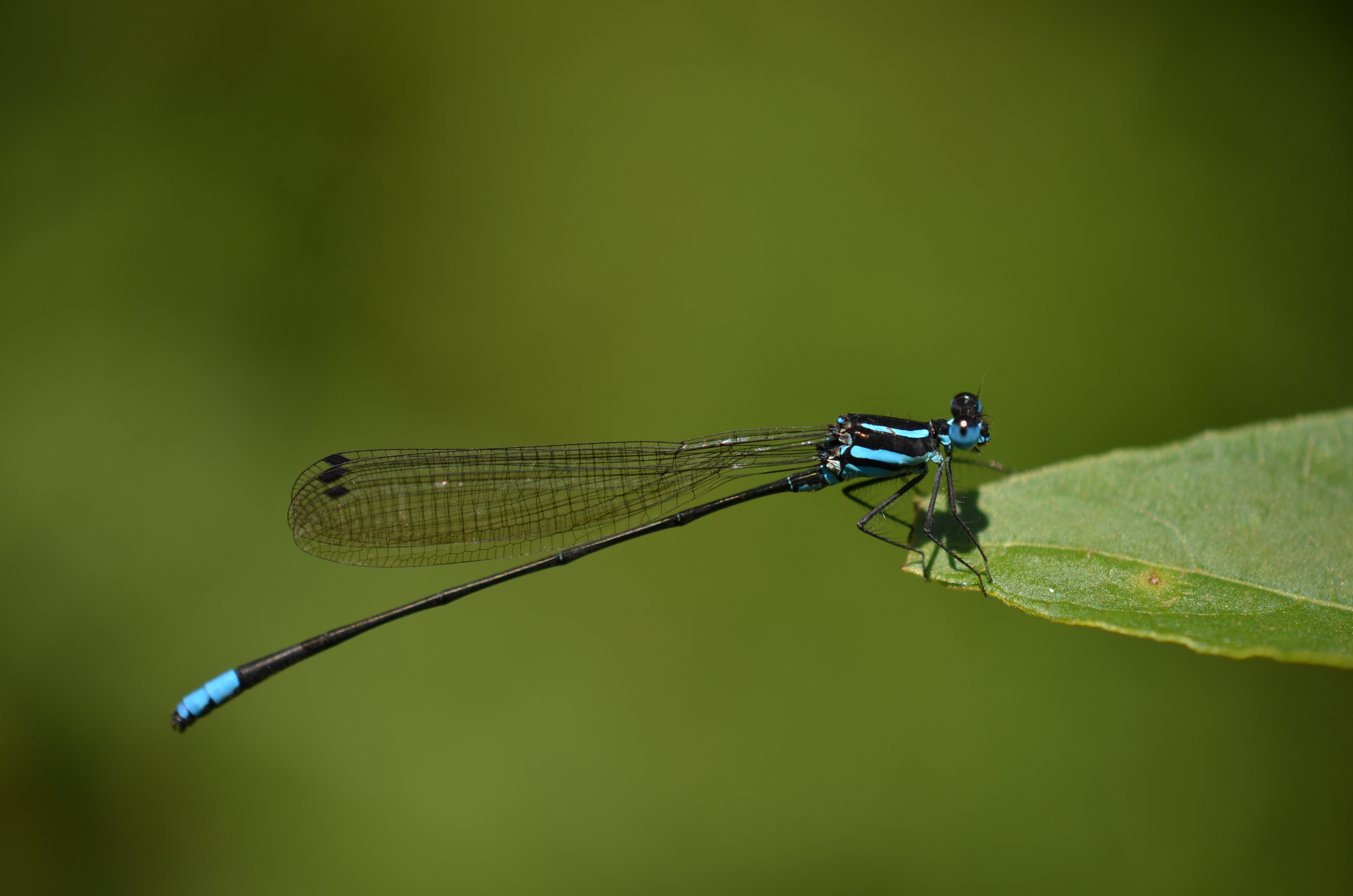
- Copera marginipes

Scientific classification
- Kingdom: Animalia
- Phylum: Arthropoda
- Clade: Pancrustacea
- Class: Insecta
- Order: Odonata
- Suborder: Zygoptera
- Superfamily: Coenagrionoidea
- Family: Platycnemididae; Bianchi, 1904

Subfamilies
- Allocnemidinae Dijkstra, 2014; Calicnemiinae Fraser, 1957; Disparoneurinae Fraser, 1957; Idiocnemidinae Dijkstra, 2014; Onychargiinae Dijkstra, 2014; Platycnemidinae Bianchi, 1904
- Distribution of Platycnemididae

= Platycnemididae =

Platycnemididae Temporal range: Cenomanian–Recent

Family of damselflies

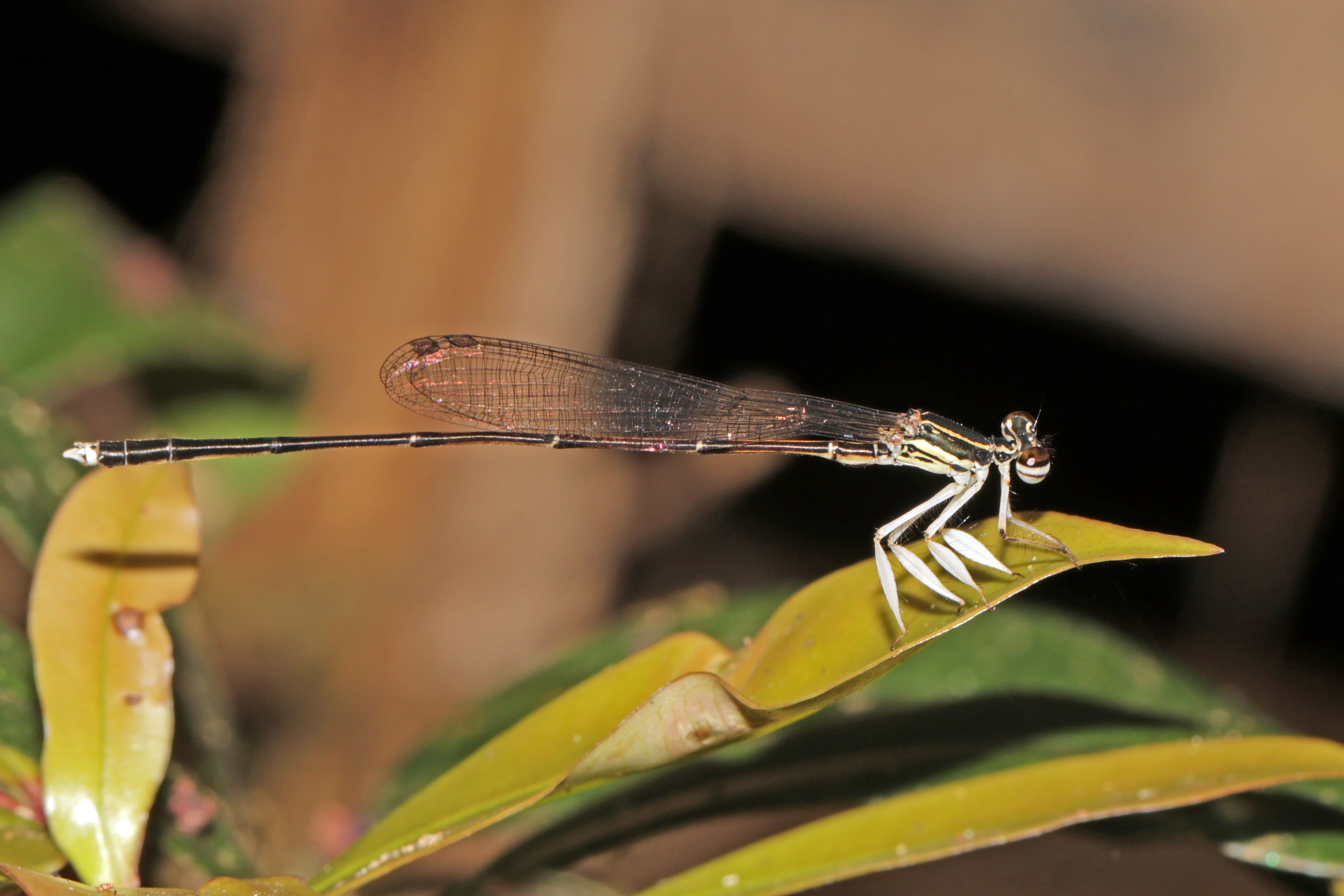
Malagasy featherleg (Proplatycnemis hova)

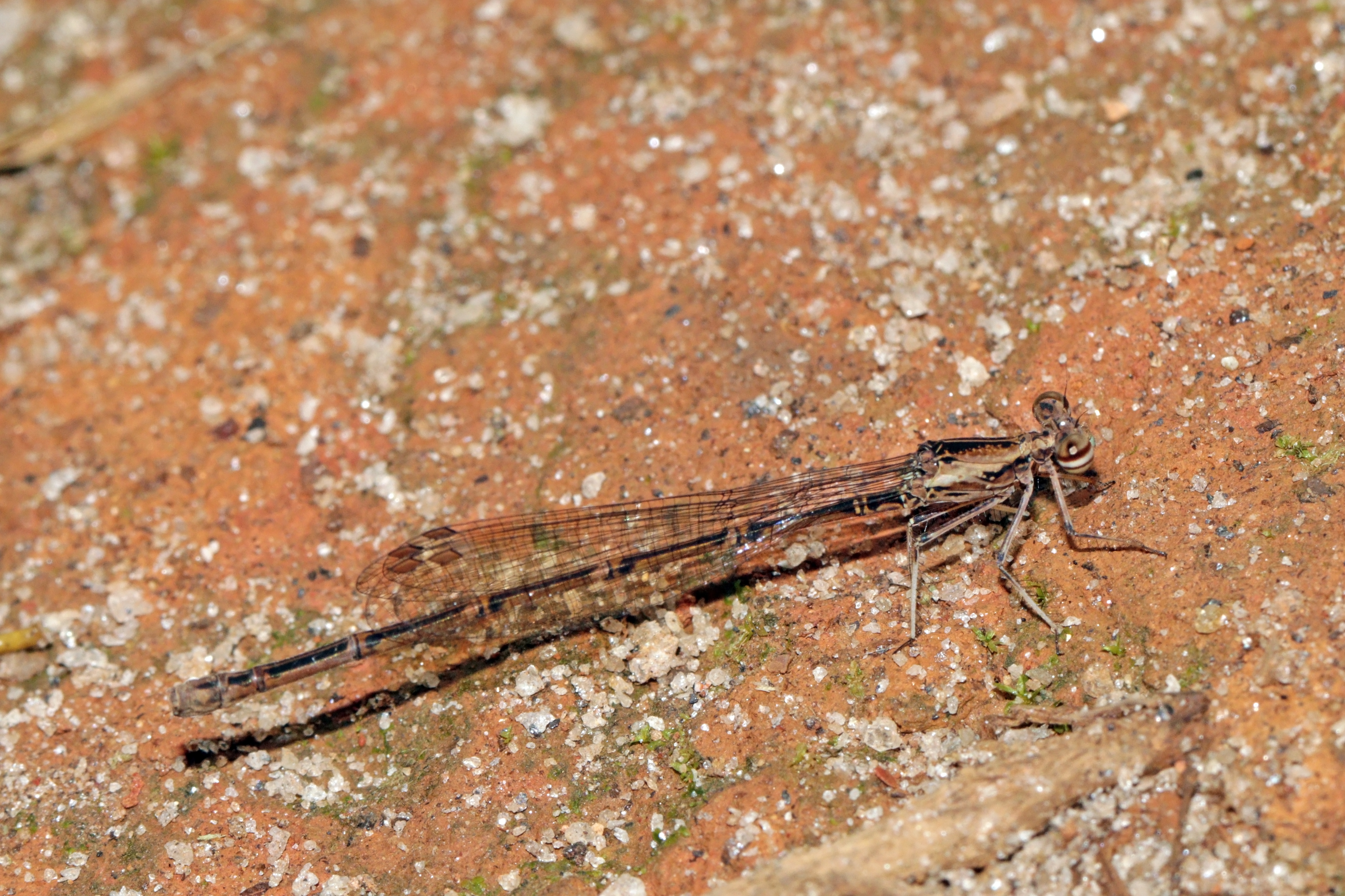
Proplatycnemis alatipes female

Platycnemididae is a family of damselflies in the superfamily Coenagrionoidea. The family contains more than 400 species distributed throughout the Old World, particularly in Africa, Asia and the western Pacific.

Many species have broadened tibiae and are commonly known as white-legged damselflies, although this feature is absent in some groups.

The family includes several lineages formerly placed in Protoneuridae and is now recognised as one of the three major families of Coenagrionoidea.

== Description ==
Members of Platycnemididae are small to medium-sized damselflies, typically slender-bodied and associated with streams and rivers. The family is distributed throughout the Old World, particularly in tropical regions of Africa, Asia and the western Pacific.

Adults are diverse in appearance, but many species have laterally expanded heads and long tibial spines. In some groups, particularly the subfamily Platycnemidinae, the tibiae of the middle and hind legs are broadened and often conspicuously coloured, a feature that inspired the family name. Other members lack expanded tibiae and may differ greatly in body shape and colouration.

The aquatic larvae possess three caudal gills and are typically associated with flowing freshwater habitats. In some genera the gills are modified into distinctive forms, including fringed or ruff-like structures.

== Taxonomic history ==
The family takes its name from the genus Platycnemis, whose name refers to the expanded tibiae characteristic of many members of the group. In 1840, Toussaint von Charpentier provided an etymology and diagnosis of the genus.

In 1904, Bianchi recognised Platycnemidinae as a distinct subfamily of damselflies, including the genera Platycnemis and Psilocnemis. During the twentieth century the group was generally treated as the family Platycnemididae. F. C. Fraser(1957) divided the family into two subfamilies, Platycnemininae and a broadly defined Calicneminae, noting that the latter was a heterogeneous assemblage whose relationships were not yet fully understood.

Molecular phylogenetic studies later demonstrated that the traditional classification did not accurately reflect evolutionary relationships. Dijkstra and colleagues (2014) incorporated the Old World taxa formerly placed in Protoneuridae within an expanded Platycnemididae and recognised several subfamilies, including Allocnemidinae, Calicnemiinae, Disparoneurinae, Idiocnemidinae, Onychargiinae and Platycnemidinae. Subsequent phylogenomic studies have supported the monophyly of Platycnemididae and its placement within Coenagrionoidea.

== Genera ==
The following genera are currently placed in Platycnemididae.

- Allocnemis Selys, 1863
- Arabicnemis Waterston, 1984
- Arabineura Schneider & Dumont, 1995
- Archboldargia Lieftinck, 1949
- Arrhenocnemis Lieftinck, 1933
- Asthenocnemis Lieftinck, 1949
- Caconeura Kirby, 1890
- Calicnemia Strand, 1928
- Coeliccia Kirby, 1890
- Copera Kirby, 1890
- Cyanocnemis Lieftinck, 1949
- Disparoneura Selys, 1860
- Elattoneura Cowley, 1935
- Esme Fraser, 1922
- Hylaeargia Lieftinck, 1949
- Idiocnemis Selys, 1878
- Igneocnemis Hämäläinen, 1991
- Indocnemis Laidlaw, 1917
- Lieftinckia Kimmins, 1957
- Lochmaeocnemis Lieftinck, 1949
- Macrocnemis Theischinger, Gassmann & Richards, 2015
- Matticnemis Dijkstra, 2013
- Melanoneura Fraser, 1922
- Mesocnemis Karsch, 1891
- Metacnemis Hagen, 1863
- Nososticta Hagen, 1860
- Onychargia Selys, 1865
- Palaiargia Förster, 1903
- Papuargia Lieftinck, 1938
- Paracnemis Martin, 1902
- Paramecocnemis Lieftinck, 1932
- Phylloneura Fraser, 1922
- Platycnemis Burmeister, 1839
- Prodasineura Cowley, 1934
- Proplatycnemis Kennedy, 1920
- Pseudocopera Fraser, 1922
- Rhyacocnemis Lieftinck, 1956
- Risiocnemis Cowley, 1934
- Salomocnemis Lieftinck, 1987
- Spesbona Dijkstra, 2013
- Stenocnemis Karsch, 1899
- Torrenticnemis Lieftinck, 1949

== Fossils ==
The following fossil genera have been assigned to Platycnemididae:

- † Cretadisparoneura Huang et al., 2015 Burmese amber, Myanmar, Cenomanian
- † Palaeodisparoneura Poinar, Bechly & Buckley, 2010 Burmese amber, Myanmar, Cenomanian
- † Yijenplatycnemis Zheng et al., 2017 Burmese amber, Myanmar, Cenomanian

== Etymology ==
The family name Platycnemididae is derived from the type genus Platycnemis, with the standard zoological suffix -idae used for animal families.

The genus name Platycnemis is derived from the Greek πλατύς (platys, "broad" or "flat") and κνημίς (knēmis, "leg" or "shin"), referring to the expanded tibiae characteristic of many species.

== See also ==
- List of damselflies of the world (Platycnemididae)
- List of Odonata species of Australia
