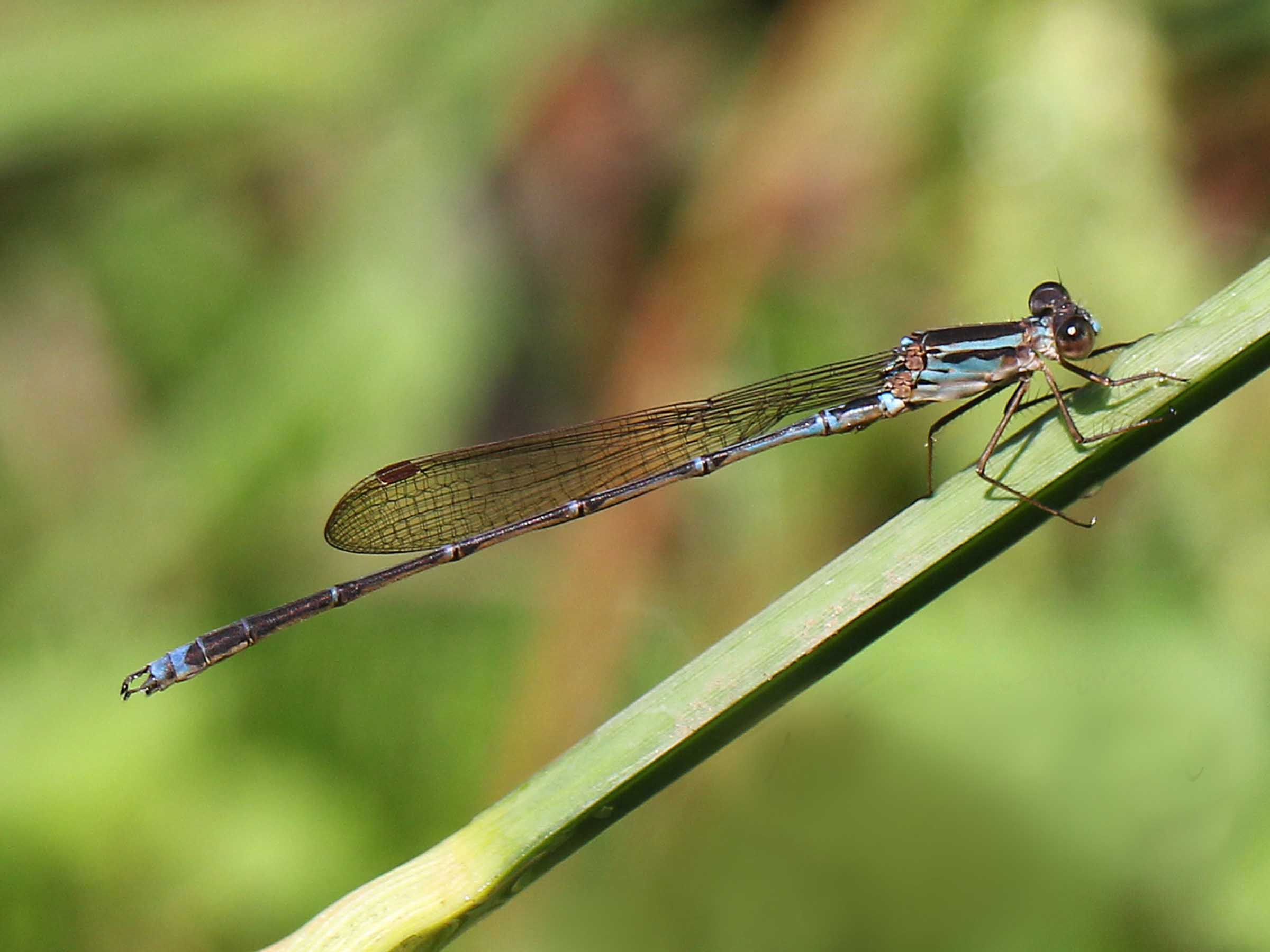
- Indolestes gracilis davenporti

Conservation status
- Least Concern (IUCN 3.1)

Scientific classification
- Kingdom: Animalia
- Phylum: Arthropoda
- Clade: Pancrustacea
- Class: Insecta
- Order: Odonata
- Suborder: Zygoptera
- Family: Lestidae
- Genus: Indolestes
- Species: I. gracilis

Binomial name
- Indolestes gracilis (Hagen in Selys, 1862)

Synonyms
- Ceylonlestes davenporti Fraser, 1930; Indolestes gracilis expressior Kosterin, 2015

= Indolestes gracilis =

Species of damselfly

Indolestes gracilis is a species of damselfly in the family Lestidae. It is known only from Sri Lanka, South India and Cambodia.

== Subspecies ==
There are three recognized subspecies.

- Indolestes gracilis gracilis - from Sri Lanka
- Indolestes gracilis davenporti - from South India
- Indolestes gracilis expressior - from Cambodia

Indolestes gracilis birmanus (Selys, 1891) described from Myanmar is now considered as a distinct species, Indolestes birmanus.

== Description and habitat ==
It is a medium sized damselfly with blue eyes. Its thorax is black on dorsum with a narrow blue mid-dorsal and broad ante-humeral stripes. The lower edge of the black is like a saw-tooth, followed by azure blue on the base of the lateral sides. Wings are transparent with black or dark reddish-brown pterostigma. Abdomen is azure blue on the sides, broadly black on dorsum up to the basal half of segment 9. The apical half of segment 9 and whole of segment 10 are azure blue. There is a black spot on each side of segment 10. Anal appendages are blue; black on old males.

Female is similar to the male; differs only in the eye color and color of the last segments. Segment 9 is black.

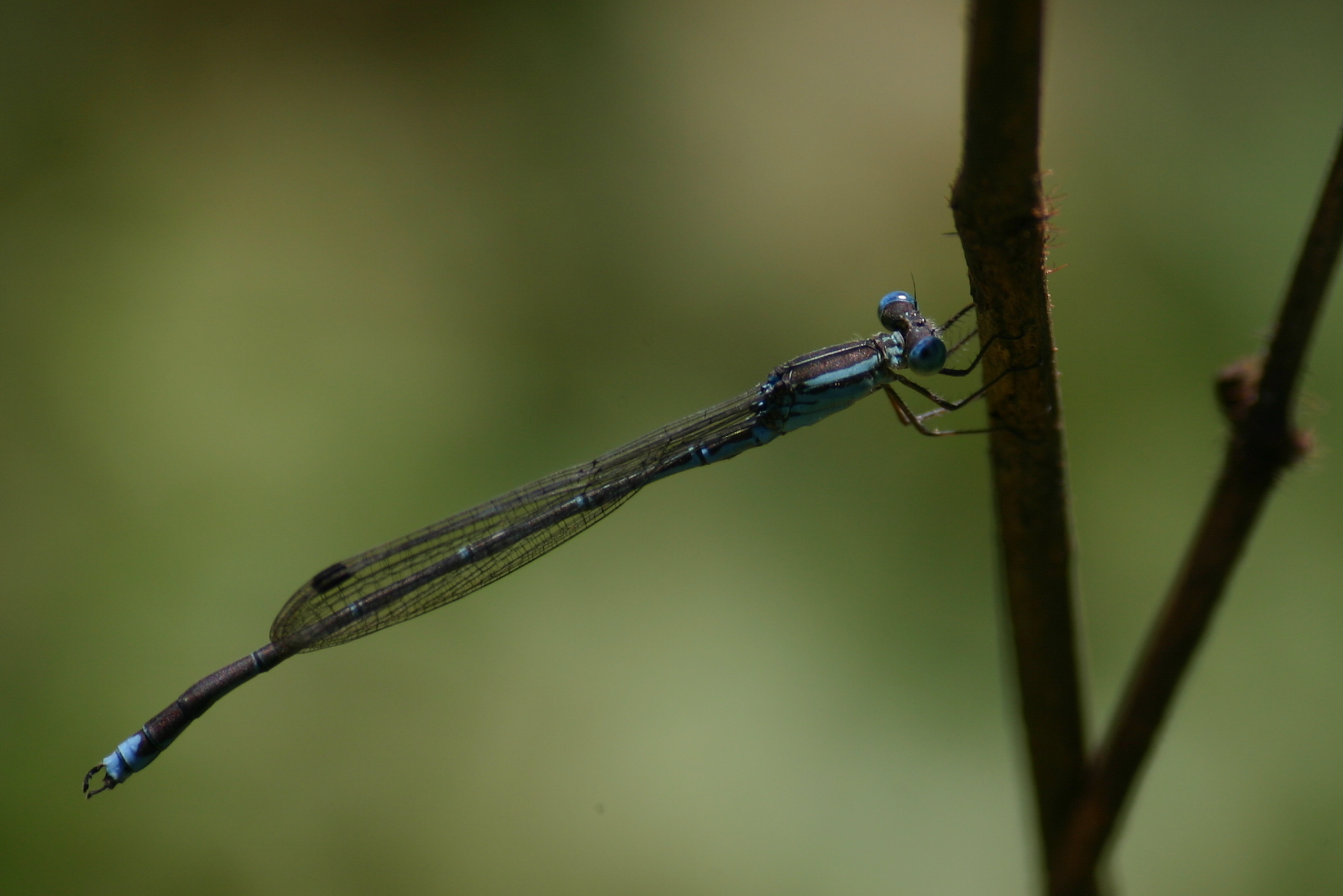
Male

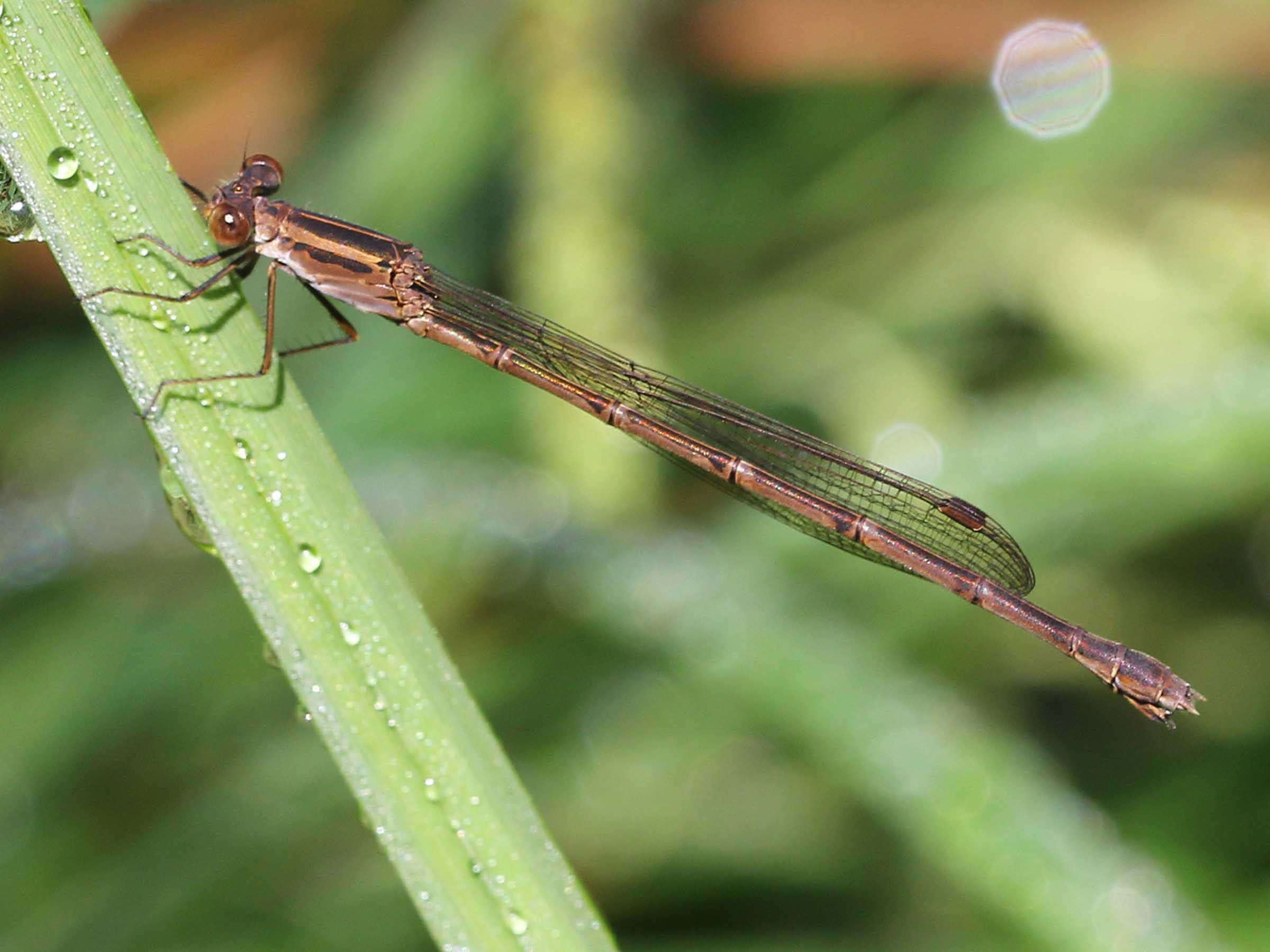
Female

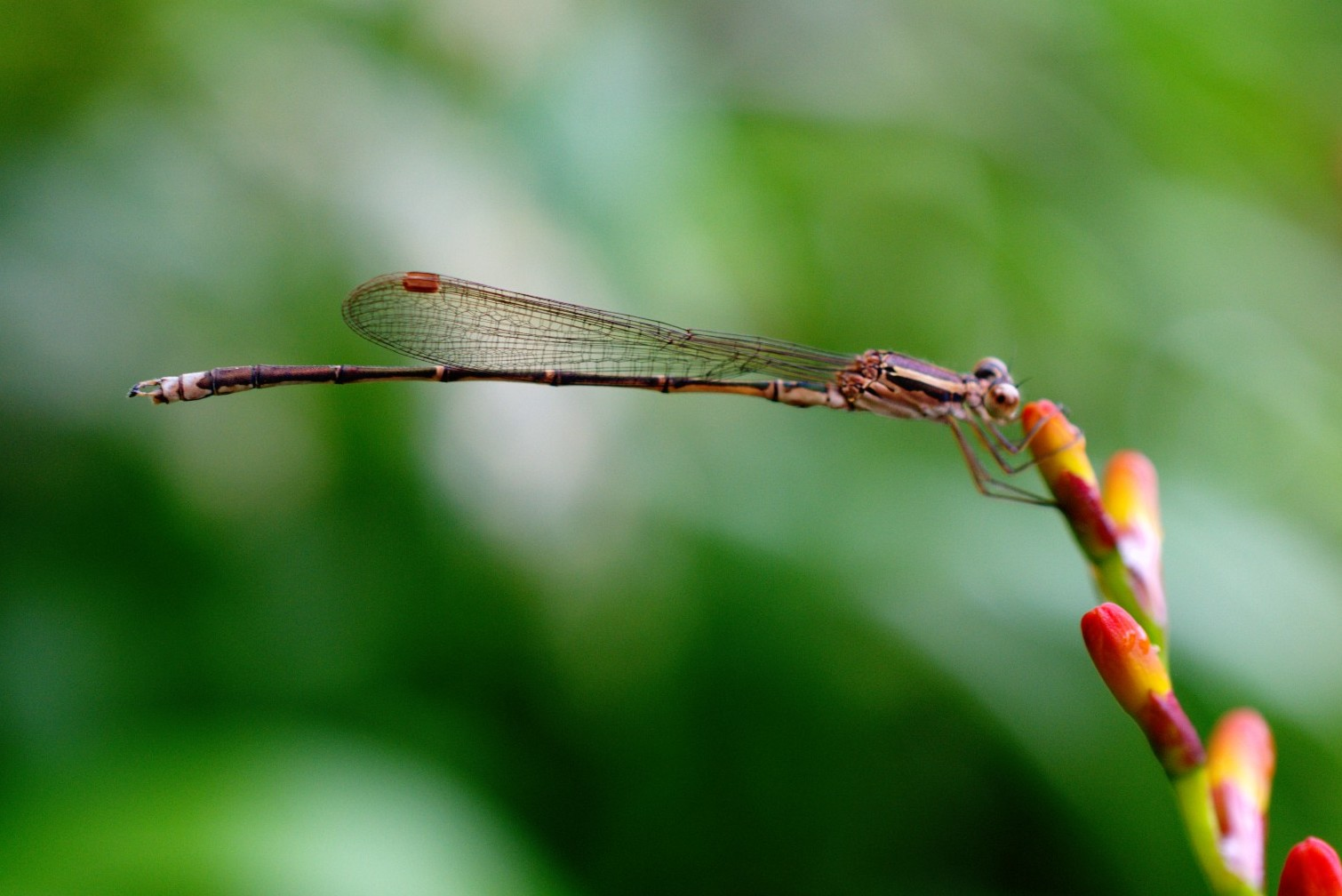
Young male

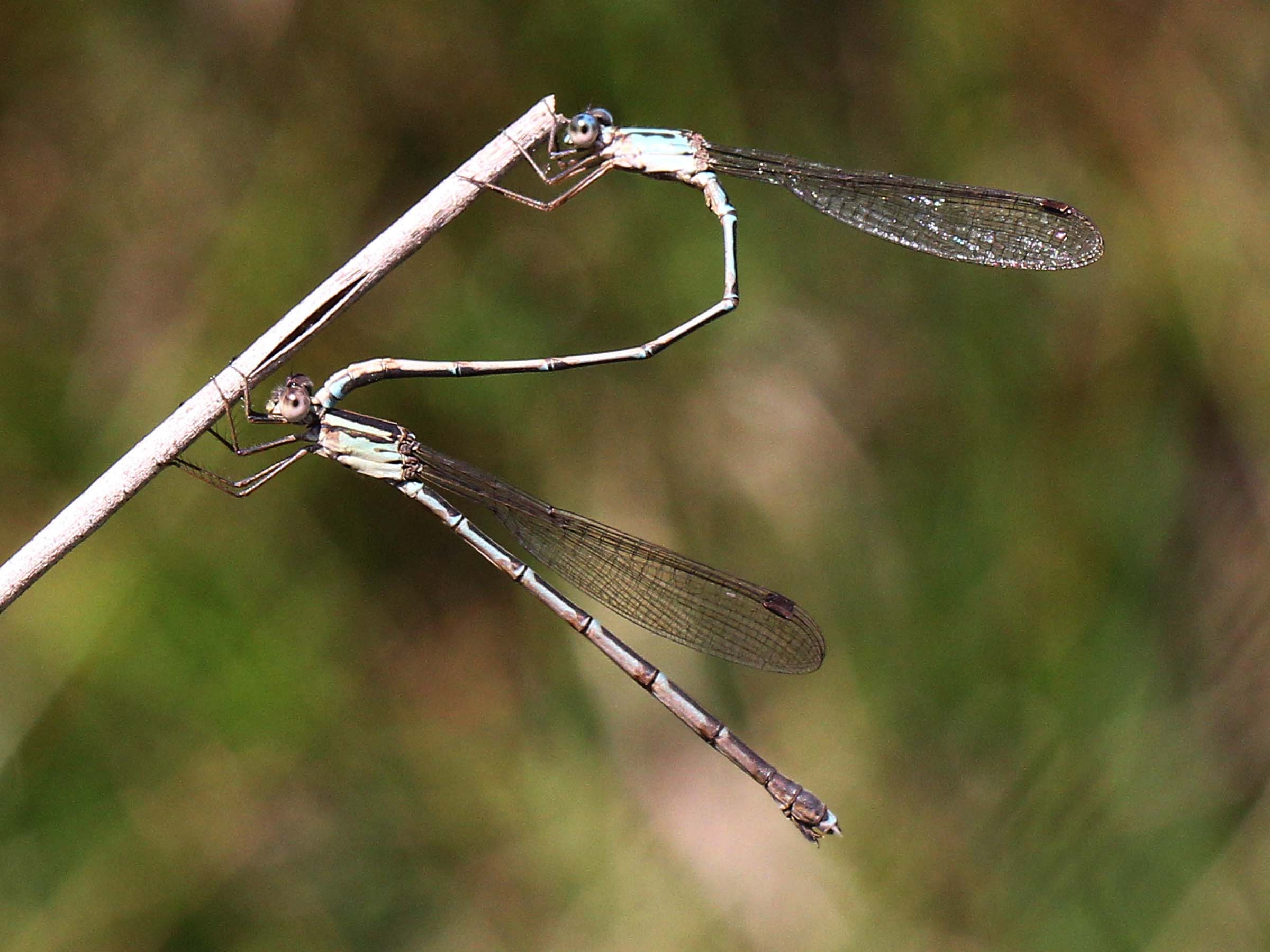
Tandem pair

== Habitat ==
Indolestes gracilis gracilis is found in hill tracts up to 6,000 feet in Sri Lanka. Indolestes gracilis davenporti is found south of the Palakkad Gap, from 4,000 to 6,000 feet in Western Ghats. Indolestes gracilis expressior is found from 1600 to 4500 feet in evergreen forest in eastern Cambodia.

== See also ==
- List of odonates of Sri Lanka
- List of odonates of India
- List of odonata of Kerala
