= Indolestes aruanus =

Scientific classification
- Kingdom: Animalia
- Phylum: Arthropoda
- Clade: Pancrustacea
- Class: Insecta
- Order: Odonata
- Suborder: Zygoptera
- Family: Lestidae
- Genus: Indolestes
- Species: I. aruanus

Binomial name
- Indolestes aruanus Lieftinck, 1951

Species of damselfly

Indolestes aruanus is a species of spreadwing in the damselfly family Lestidae.
