= Indolestes dajakanus =

Scientific classification
- Kingdom: Animalia
- Phylum: Arthropoda
- Clade: Pancrustacea
- Class: Insecta
- Order: Odonata
- Suborder: Zygoptera
- Family: Lestidae
- Genus: Indolestes
- Species: I. dajakanus

Binomial name
- Indolestes dajakanus (Lieftinck, 1948)

Species of damselfly

Indolestes dajakanus is a species of spreadwing in the damselfly family Lestidae.
