= Indolestes luxatus =

Scientific classification
- Kingdom: Animalia
- Phylum: Arthropoda
- Clade: Pancrustacea
- Class: Insecta
- Order: Odonata
- Suborder: Zygoptera
- Family: Lestidae
- Genus: Indolestes
- Species: I. luxatus

Binomial name
- Indolestes luxatus (Lieftinck, 1932)

Species of damselfly

Indolestes luxatus is a species of spreadwing in the damselfly family Lestidae.
