= Indolestes bellax =

Conservation status
- Near Threatened (IUCN 3.1)

Scientific classification
- Kingdom: Animalia
- Phylum: Arthropoda
- Clade: Pancrustacea
- Class: Insecta
- Order: Odonata
- Suborder: Zygoptera
- Family: Lestidae
- Genus: Indolestes
- Species: I. bellax

Binomial name
- Indolestes bellax (Lieftinck, 1930)

Species of damselfly

Indolestes bellax is a species of spreadwing in the damselfly family Lestidae.

The IUCN conservation status of Indolestes bellax is "NT", near threatened. The species may be considered threatened in the near future. The population is decreasing. The IUCN status was reviewed in 2009.
