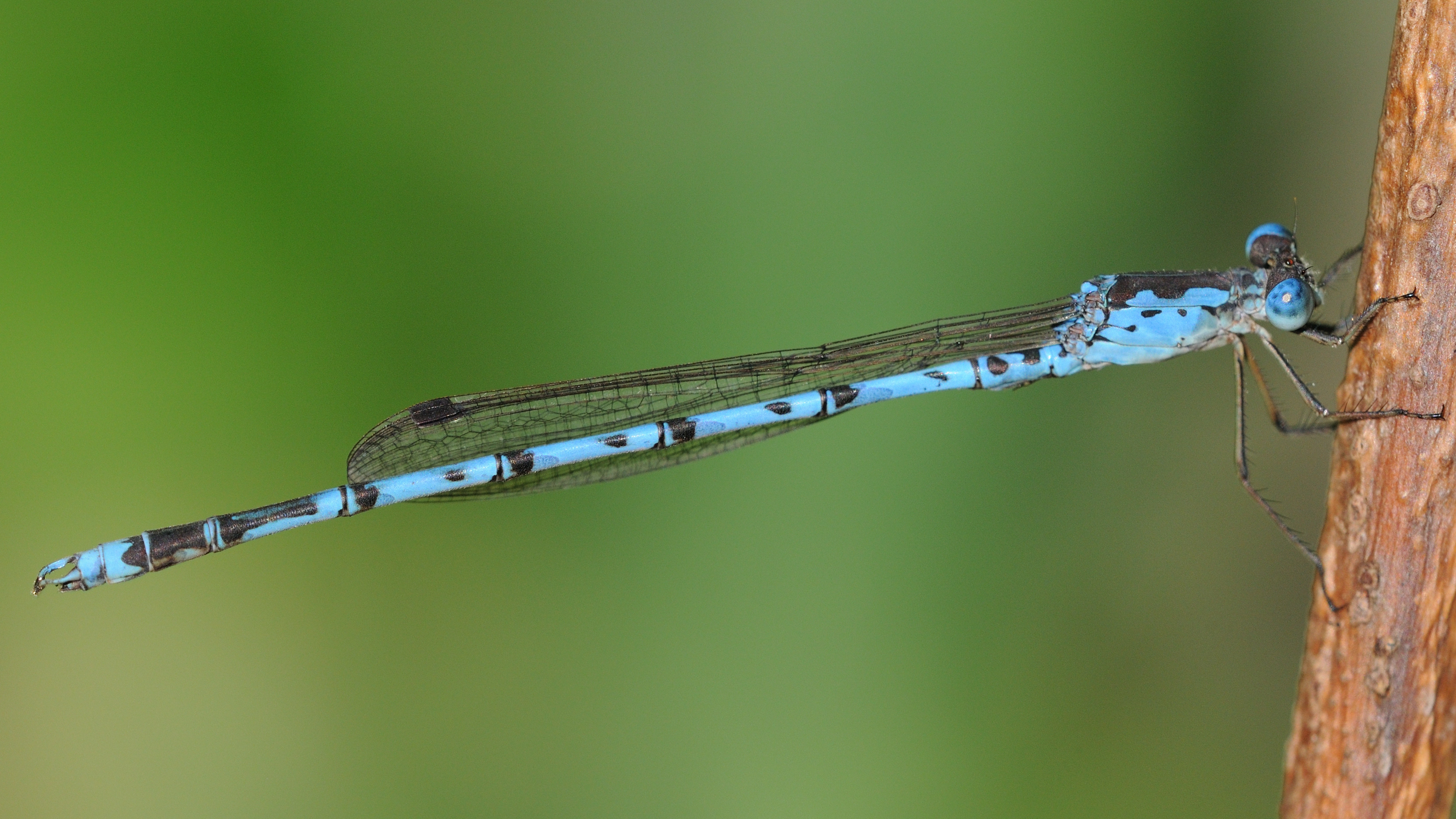
- Male
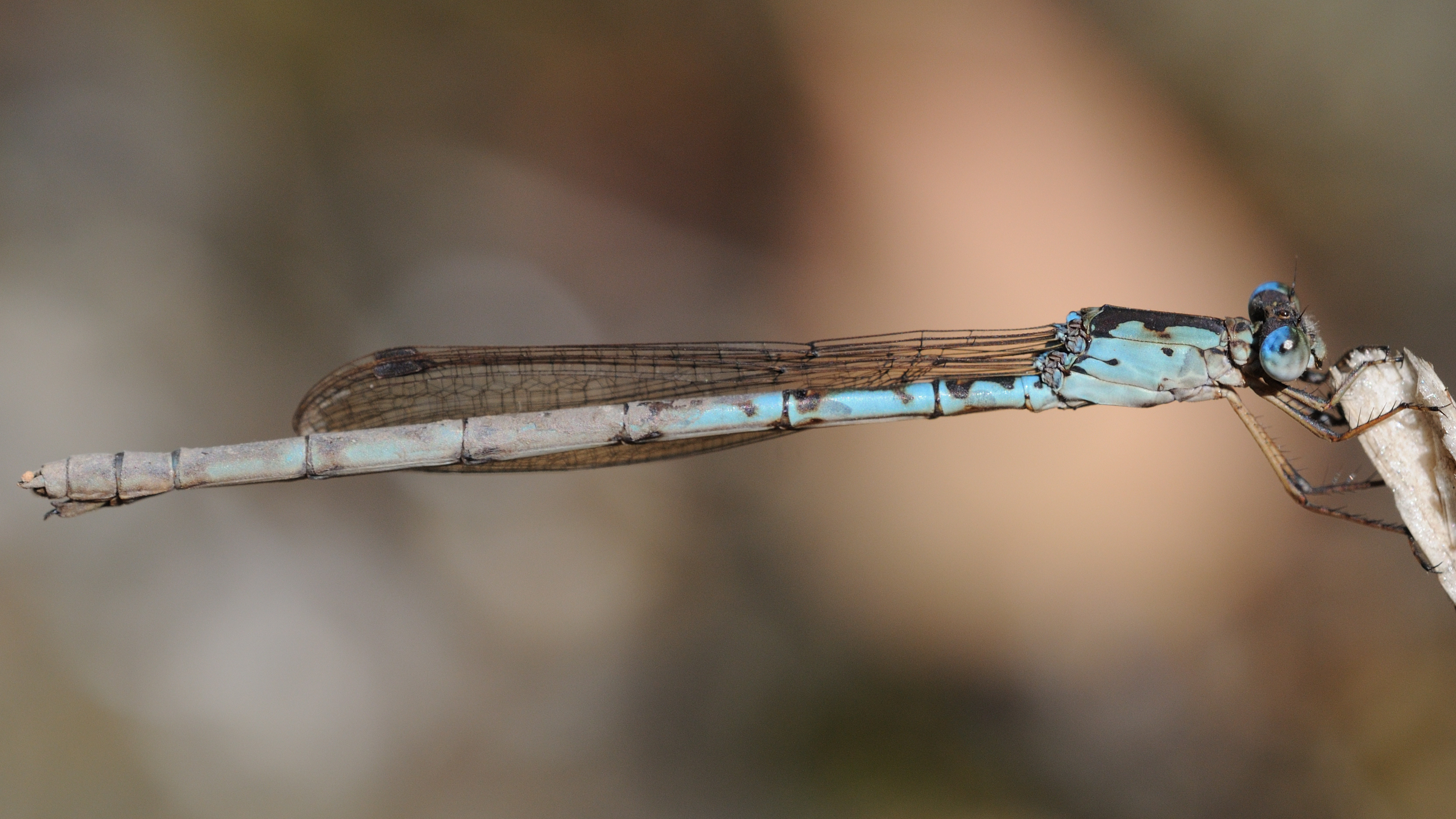
- Female

Conservation status
- Least Concern (IUCN 3.1)

Scientific classification
- Kingdom: Animalia
- Phylum: Arthropoda
- Clade: Pancrustacea
- Class: Insecta
- Order: Odonata
- Suborder: Zygoptera
- Family: Lestidae
- Genus: Indolestes
- Species: I. peregrinus

Binomial name
- Indolestes peregrinus (Ris, 1916)

= Indolestes peregrinus =

Species of damselfly

Indolestes peregrinus is a species of spreadwing in the damselfly family Lestidae.

The IUCN conservation status of Indolestes peregrinus is "LC", least concern, with no immediate threat to the species' survival. The population is stable. The IUCN status was reviewed in 2009.
