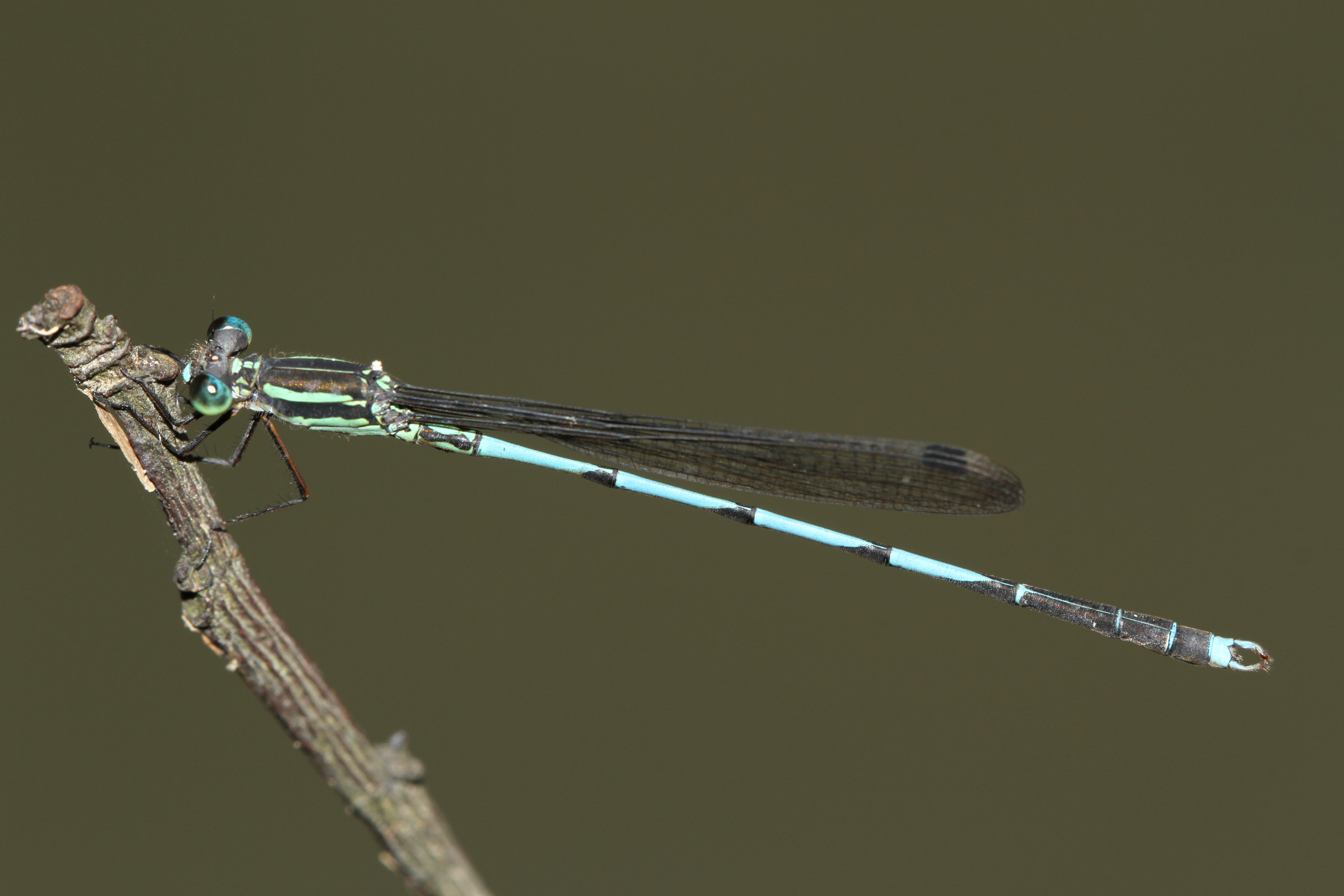

Conservation status
- Least Concern (IUCN 3.1)

Scientific classification
- Kingdom: Animalia
- Phylum: Arthropoda
- Clade: Pancrustacea
- Class: Insecta
- Order: Odonata
- Suborder: Zygoptera
- Family: Lestidae
- Genus: Indolestes
- Species: I. cyaneus

Binomial name
- Indolestes cyaneus (Selys, 1862)

= Indolestes cyaneus =

Species of damselfly

Indolestes cyaneus is a species of spreadwing in the damselfly family Lestidae.

The IUCN conservation status of Indolestes cyaneus is "LC", least concern, with no immediate threat to the species' survival. The IUCN status was reviewed in 2009.
