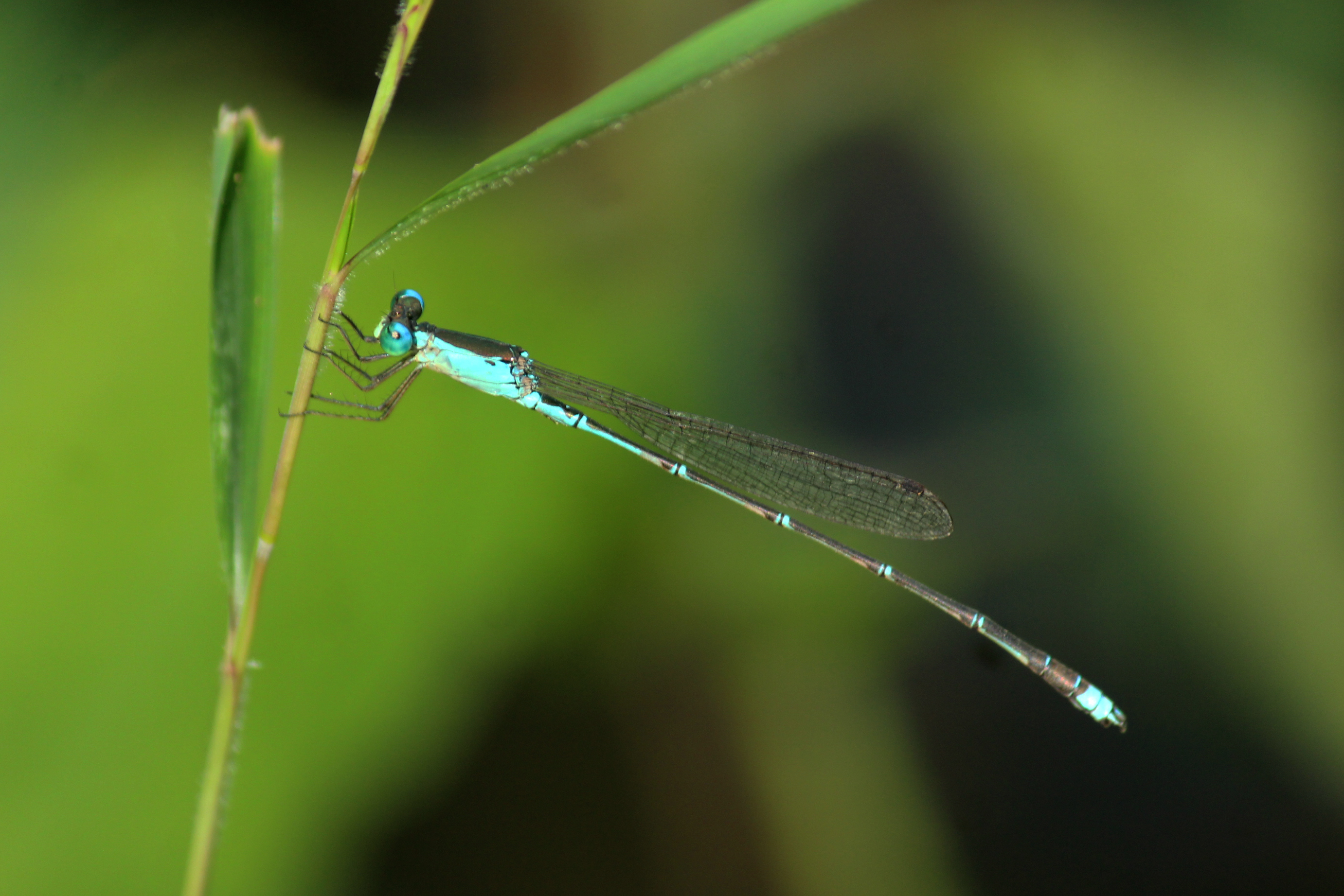

Conservation status
- Data Deficient (IUCN 3.1)

Scientific classification
- Kingdom: Animalia
- Phylum: Arthropoda
- Clade: Pancrustacea
- Class: Insecta
- Order: Odonata
- Suborder: Zygoptera
- Family: Lestidae
- Genus: Indolestes
- Species: I. pulcherrimus

Binomial name
- Indolestes pulcherrimus (Fraser, 1924)

Synonyms
- Ceylonlestes pulcherrima Fraser, 1924

= Indolestes pulcherrimus =

Species of damselfly

Indolestes pulcherrimus is a species of spreadwing in the damselfly family Lestidae. The species was known only from in Kodagu district, Karnataka. Later it is found in forest swamps in Wayanad district, Kerala too.

== Description and habitat ==
It is a medium-sized damselfly with blue eyes. Its prothorax is brownish above and bluish on the sides. Its thorax is dark metallic green on dorsum with a narrow blue mid-dorsal stripe. Sides are blue, marked with a large black spot behind the lateral suture, followed by a smaller one in the middle. Wings are transparent with blackish-brown pterostigma. Abdomen is azure blue on the sides, marked with black on dorsum. The mark on segment 2 looks like a thistle head. Segments 8 is black. The apical half of segment 9 and whole of segment 10 are azure blue.

Female is similar to the male; differs only in the colors. Segment 8-10 are dark brown.

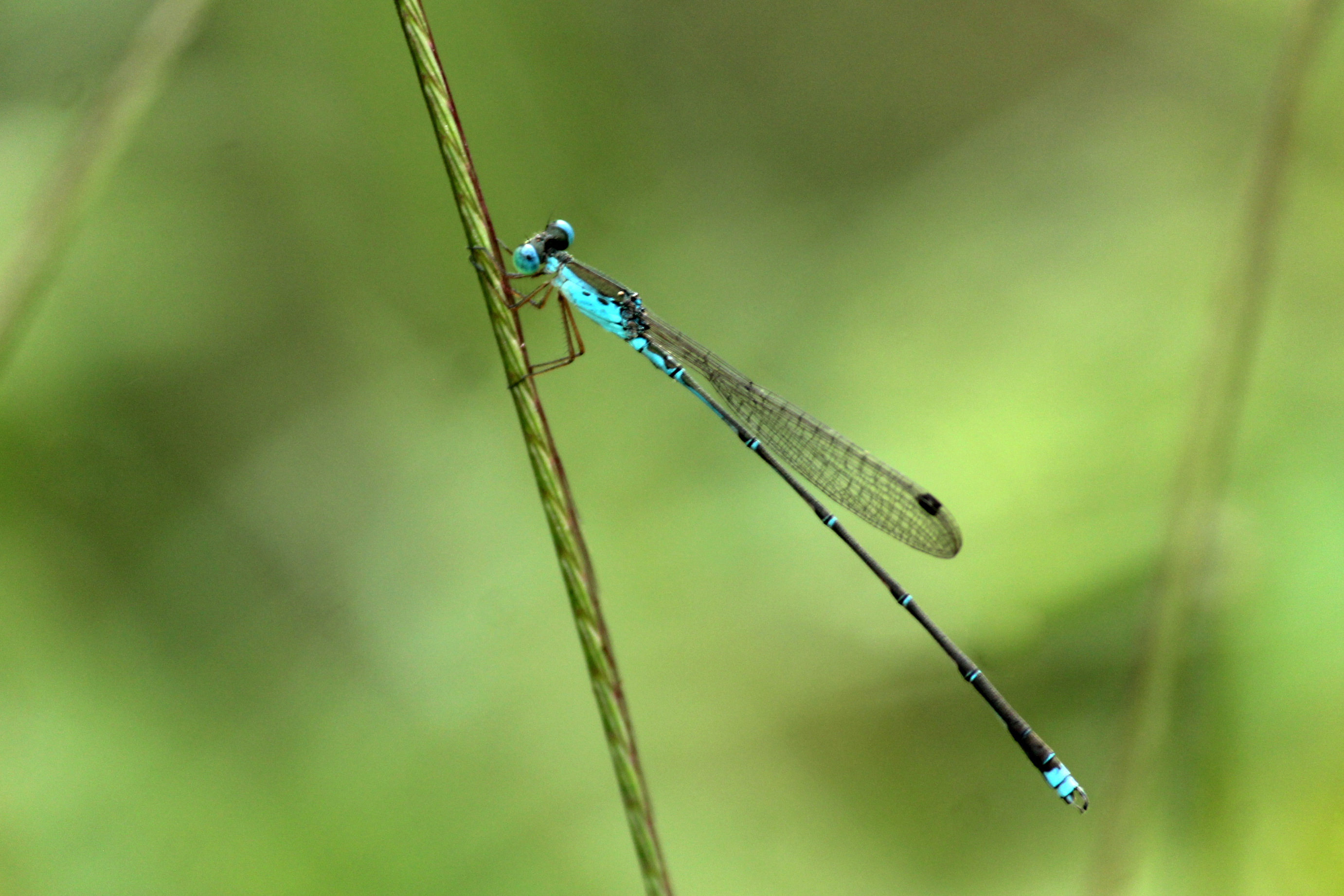
male

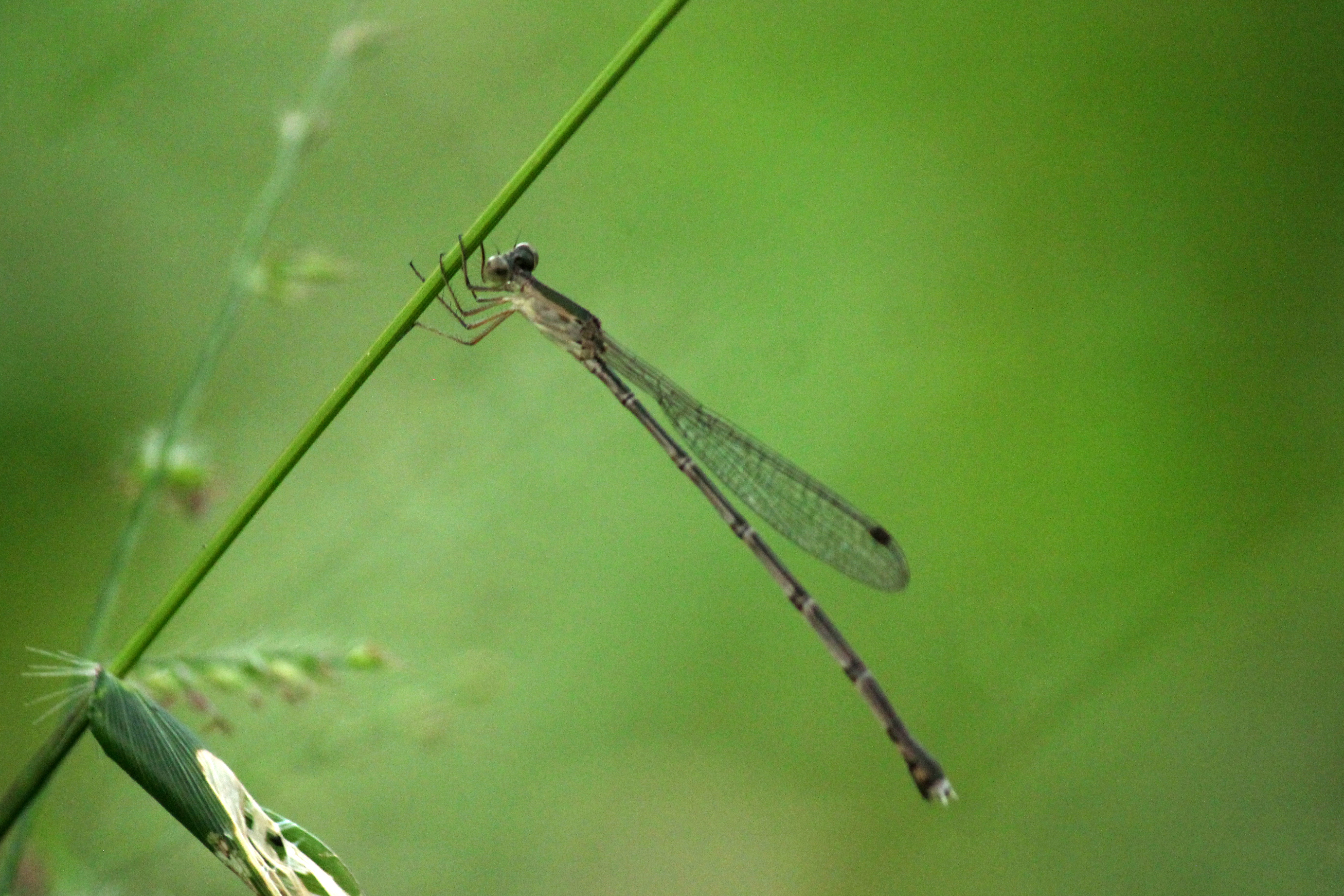
female

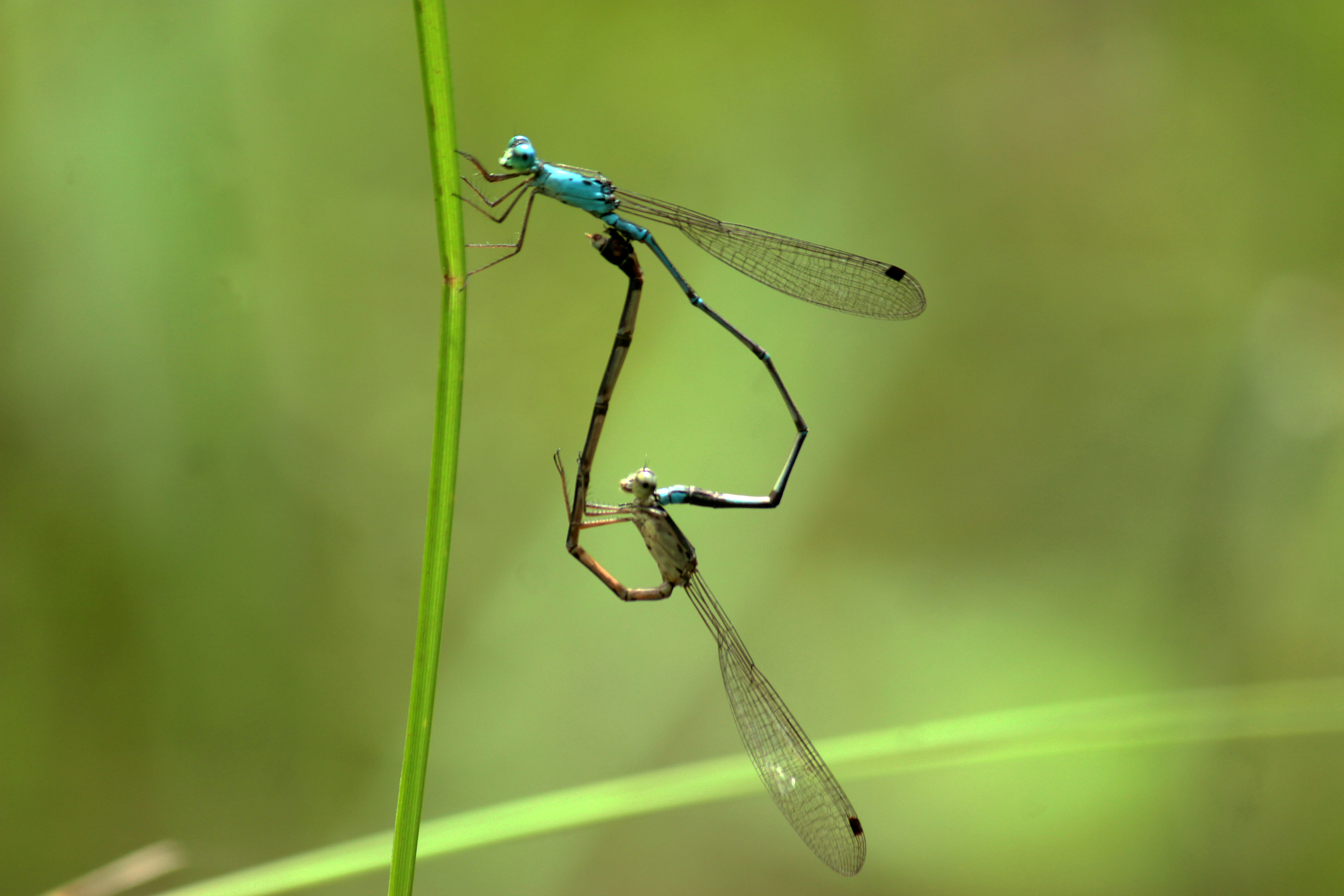
mating pair

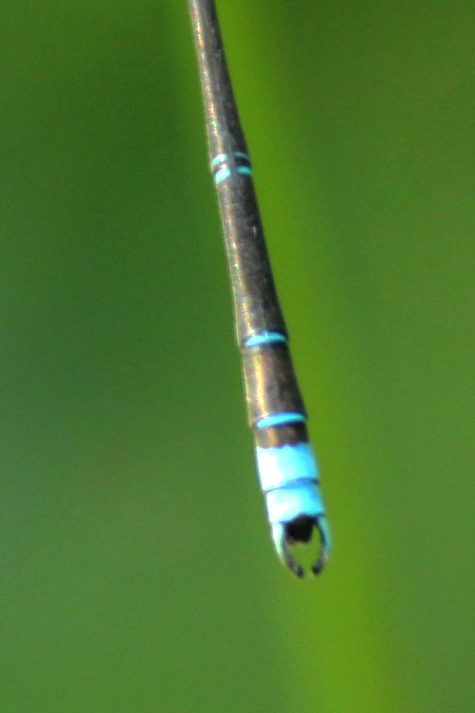
anal appendages (male)

== See also ==
- List of odonates of India
- List of odonata of Kerala
