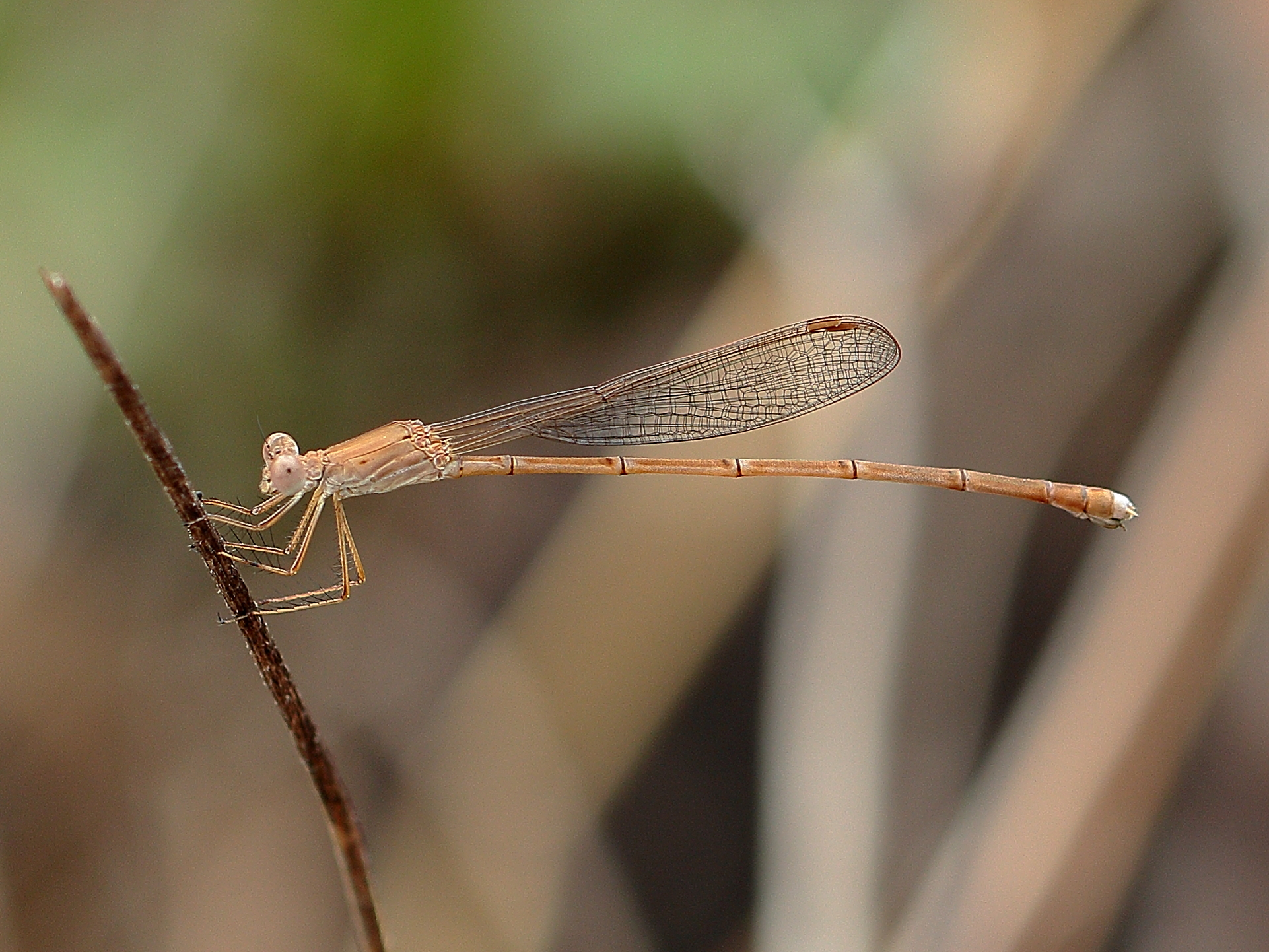
- Immature female

Conservation status
- Least Concern (IUCN 3.1)

Scientific classification
- Kingdom: Animalia
- Phylum: Arthropoda
- Clade: Pancrustacea
- Class: Insecta
- Order: Odonata
- Suborder: Zygoptera
- Family: Lestidae
- Genus: Indolestes
- Species: I. insularis

Binomial name
- Indolestes insularis (Tillyard, 1913)

Synonyms
- Austrolestes insularis Tillyard, 1913

= Indolestes insularis =

Northern ringtail

Species of damselfly

Indolestes insularis is an Australian species of damselfly in the family Lestidae, commonly known as a northern ringtail. It is widespread across northern Australia, where it inhabits streams, pools, and ponds.

Indolestes insularis is a medium-sized to large damselfly, the male is light blue and brown.

== Etymology ==
The genus name Indolestes combines the Latin Indus ("India") with Lestes, a genus name derived from the Greek λῃστής (lēstēs, "robber"). Original members of this genus were from India.

The species name insularis is Latin for "pertaining to an island", referring to Banks Island in Torres Strait, where the original specimens of this species were collected.

== Gallery ==
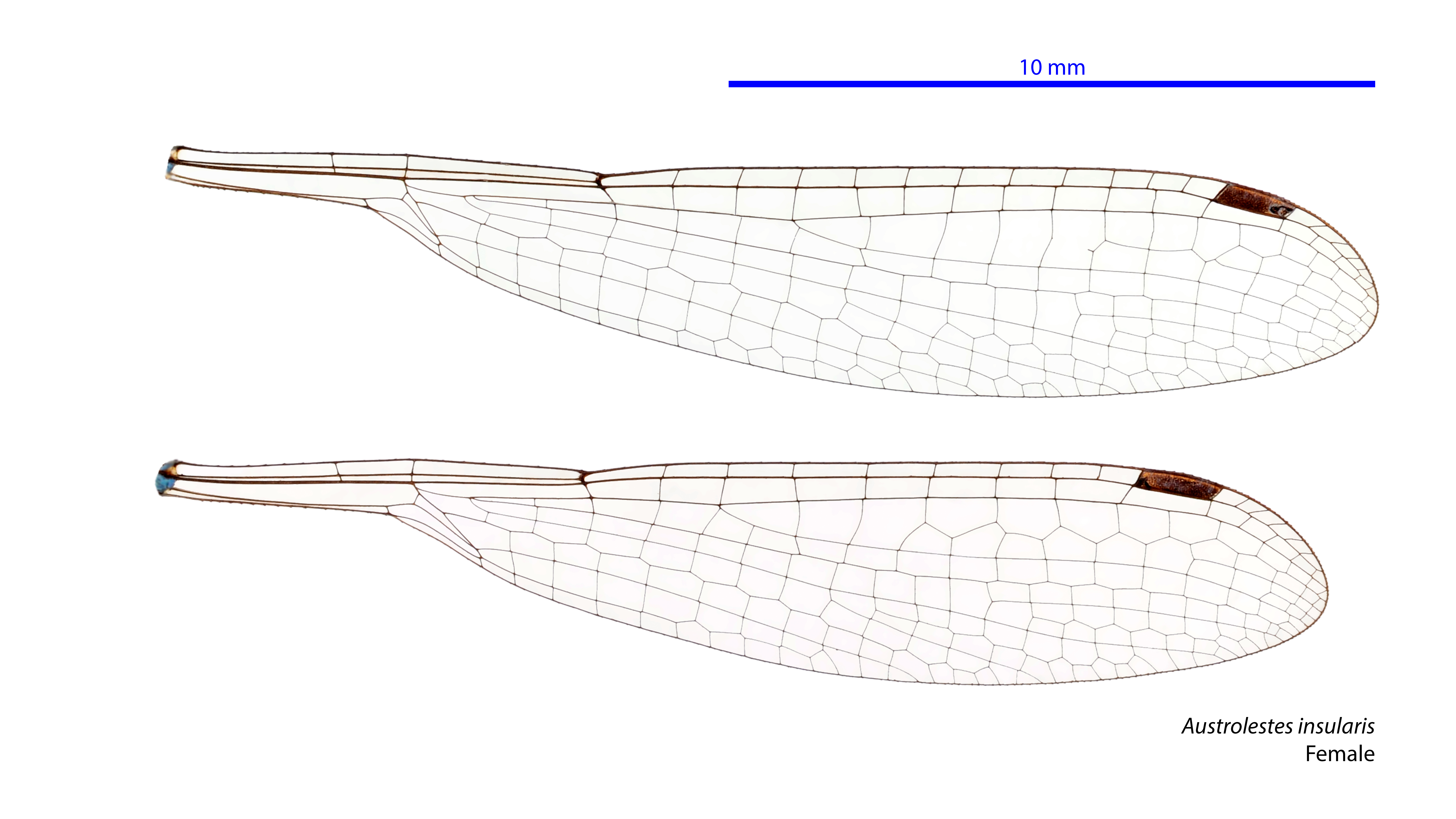
Female wings

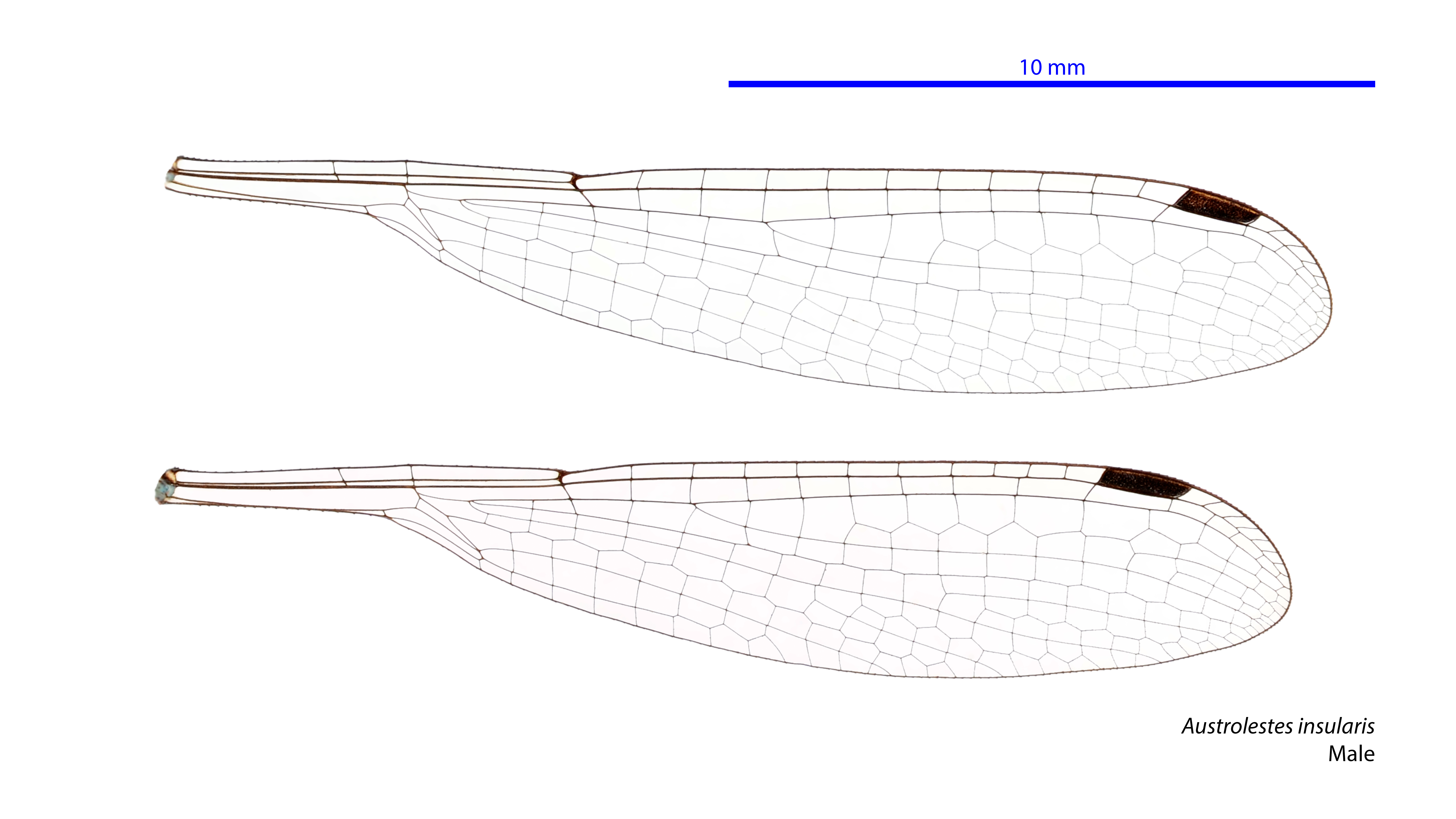
Male wings

== See also ==
- List of Odonata species of Australia
