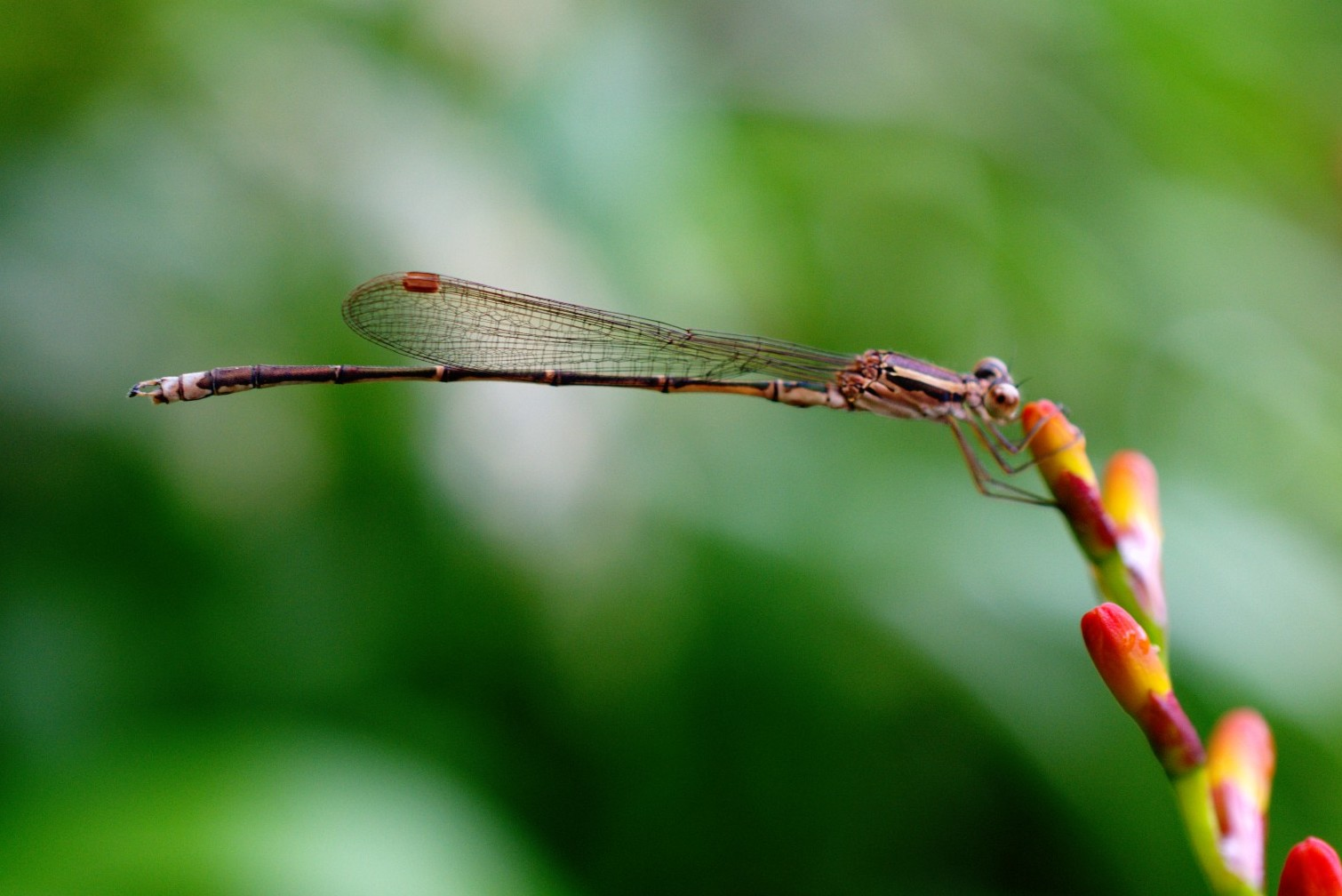
- Indolestes gracilis Tamil Nadu

Scientific classification
- Kingdom: Animalia
- Phylum: Arthropoda
- Clade: Pancrustacea
- Class: Insecta
- Order: Odonata
- Suborder: Zygoptera
- Family: Lestidae
- Genus: Indolestes; Fraser, 1922

= Indolestes =

Genus of damselflies

Indolestes is a genus of damselflies in the family Lestidae. Species of Indolestes can be medium-sized, dull coloured dragonflies. They are found from India through Asia, Australia and the Pacific.

== Etymology ==
The genus name Indolestes combines the Latin Indus ("India") with Lestes, a genus name derived from the Greek λῃστής (lēstēs, "robber"). Original members of this genus were from India.

== Species ==
The genus Indolestes includes the following species:

- Indolestes albicaudus (McLachlan, 1895)
- Indolestes alfurus Lieftinck, 1960
- Indolestes alleni (Tillyard, 1913) - Small Reedling
- Indolestes anomalus Fraser, 1946
- Indolestes aruanus Lieftinck, 1951
- Indolestes assamicus Fraser, 1930
- Indolestes bellax (Lieftinck, 1930)
- Indolestes bilineatus (Selys, 1891)
- Indolestes birmanus (Selys, 1891)
- Indolestes boninensis (Asahina, 1952)
- Indolestes cheesmanae Kimmins, 1936
- Indolestes coeruleus Fraser, 1924
- Indolestes cyaneus (Selys, 1862)
- Indolestes dajakanus (Lieftinck, 1948)
- Indolestes davenporti (Fraser, 1930)
- Indolestes divisus (Hagen in Selys, 1862)
- Indolestes extraneus (Needham, 1930)
- Indolestes floresianus Lieftinck, 1960
- Indolestes goniocercus Lieftinck, 1960
- Indolestes gracilis (Hagen in Selys, 1862)
- Indolestes guizhouensis Zhou & Zhou, 2005
- Indolestes indicus Fraser, 1922
- Indolestes inflatus (Fraser, 1933)
- Indolestes insularis (Tillyard, 1913)
- Indolestes linsleyi Lieftinck, 1960
- Indolestes lundquisti (Lieftinck, 1949)
- Indolestes luxatus (Lieftinck, 1932)
- Indolestes lygisticercus (Lieftinck, 1932)
- Indolestes obiri Watson, 1979 - Cave Reedling
- Indolestes peregrinus (Ris, 1916)
- Indolestes pulcherrimus Fraser, 1924
- Indolestes risi (Van der Weele, 1909)
- Indolestes sutteri Lieftinck, 1953
- Indolestes tenuissimus Tillyard, 1906 - Slender Reedling
- Indolestes vitiensis (Tillyard, 1924)
