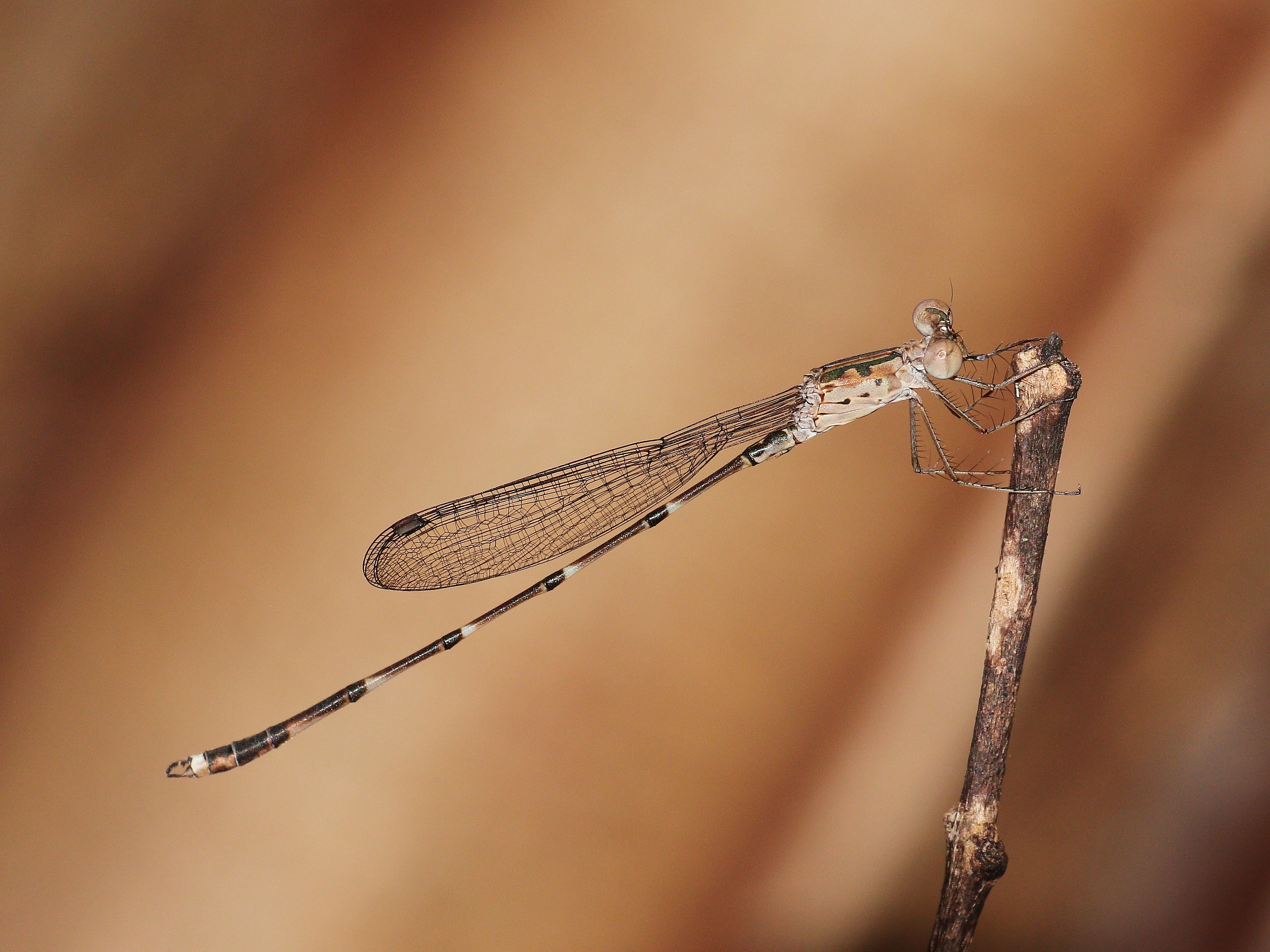
- Male small reedling, Darwin
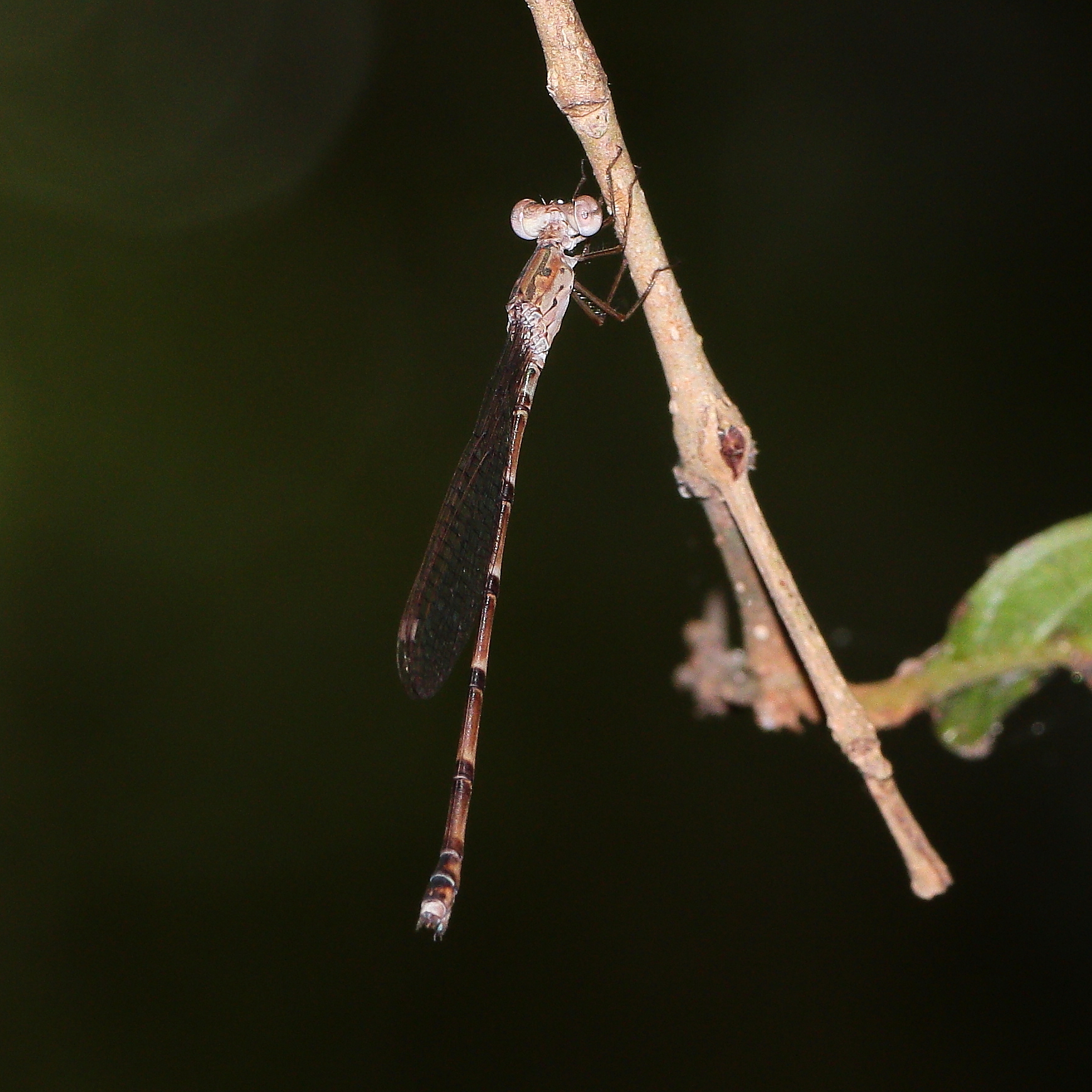
- Female, Darwin

Conservation status
- Least Concern (IUCN 3.1)

Scientific classification
- Kingdom: Animalia
- Phylum: Arthropoda
- Clade: Pancrustacea
- Class: Insecta
- Order: Odonata
- Suborder: Zygoptera
- Family: Lestidae
- Genus: Indolestes
- Species: I. alleni

Binomial name
- Indolestes alleni (Tillyard, 1913)

Synonyms
- Austrolestes alleni Tillyard, 1913; Austrolestes tindalei Tillyard, 1925

= Indolestes alleni =

Small reedling

Species of damselfly

Indolestes alleni is a species of damselfly in the family Lestidae, commonly known as a small reedling. It is found across northern Australia where it inhabits lagoons, ponds and swamps.

Indolestes alleni is a medium-sized, dull-coloured damselfly. The male superior anal appendages are forcipate.

== Etymology ==
The genus name Indolestes combines the Latin Indus ("India") with Lestes, a genus name derived from the Greek λῃστής (lēstēs, "robber"). Original members of this genus were from India.

In 1913, Robin Tillyard named this species alleni, an eponym honouring E. Allen of Cairns, Queensland, who collected the original specimen.

== Gallery ==
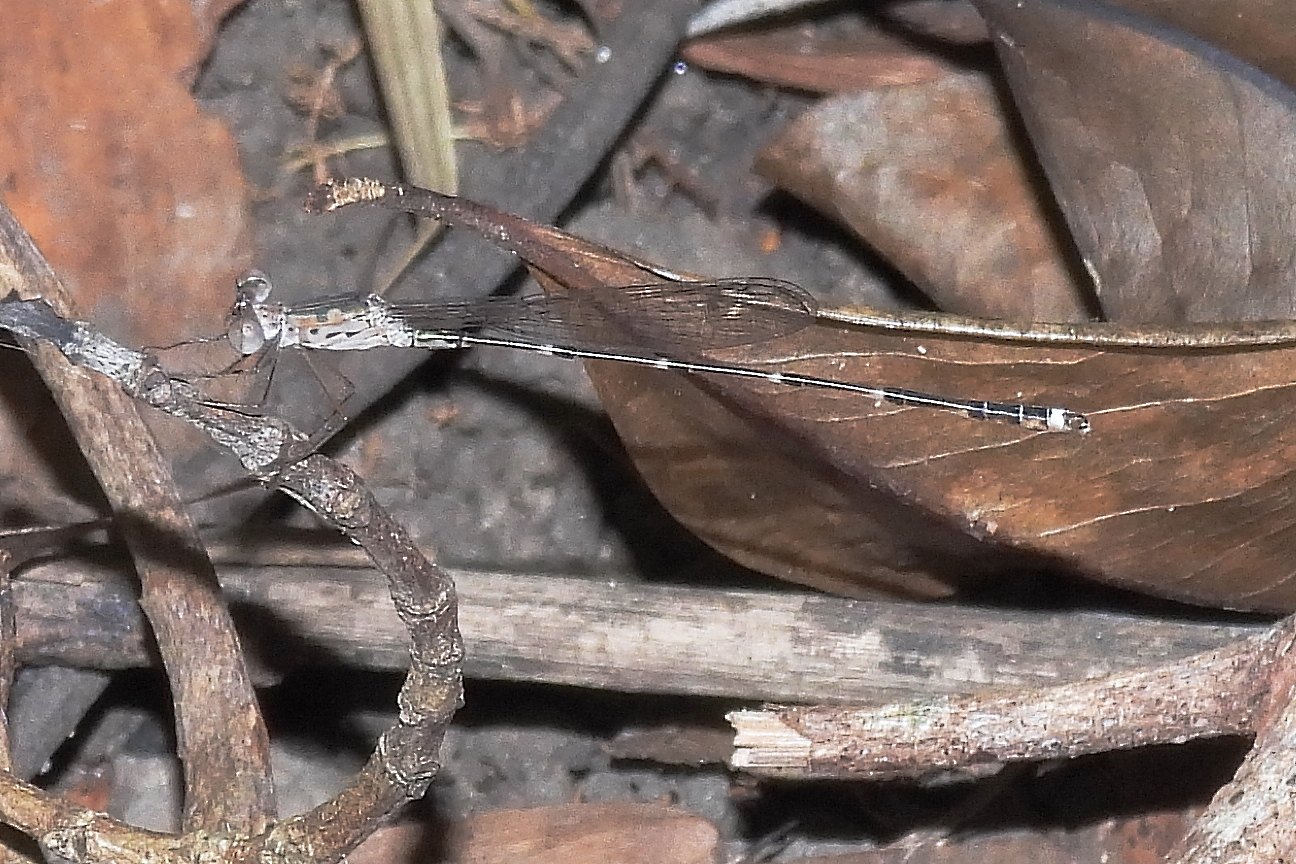
male

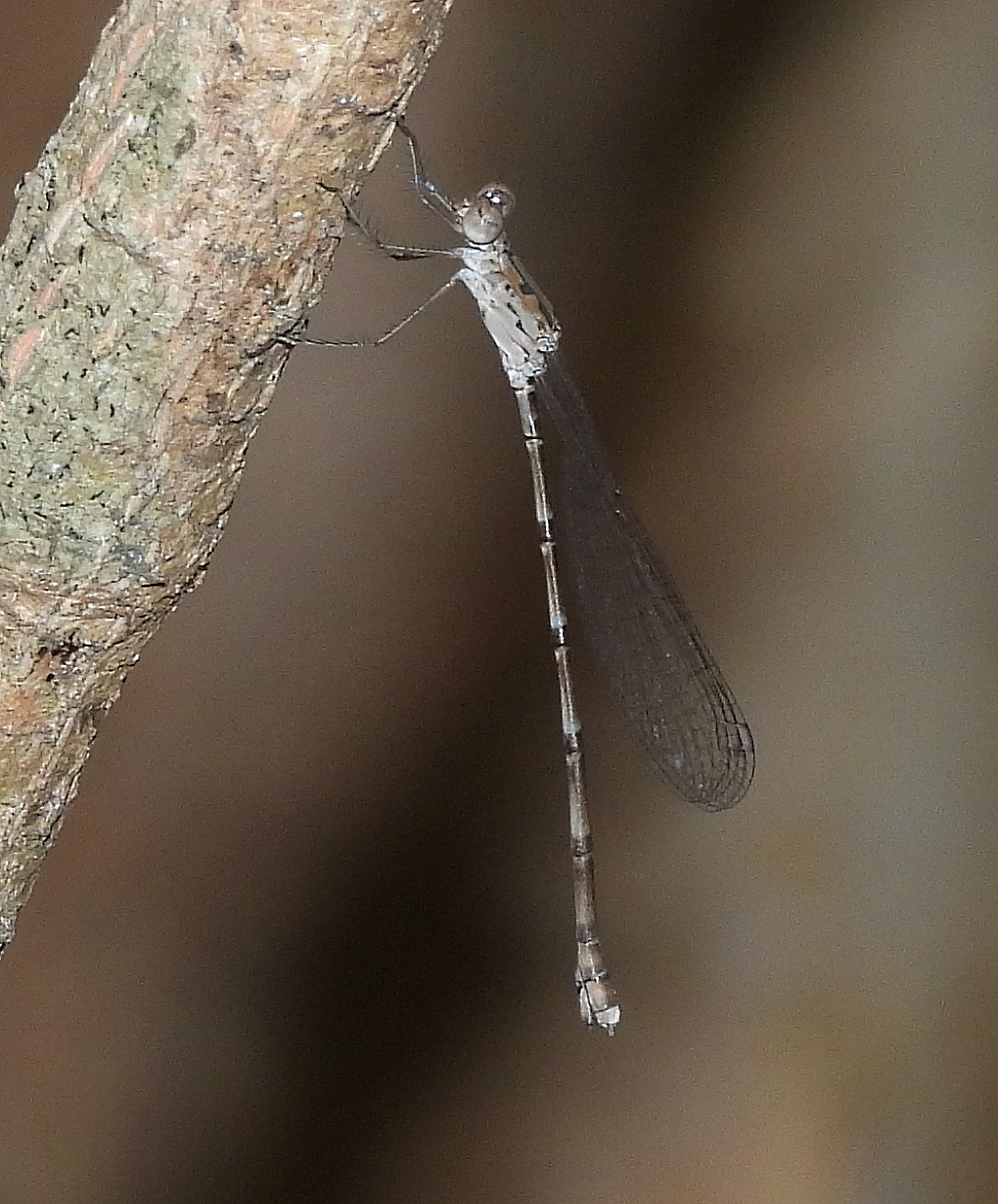
female

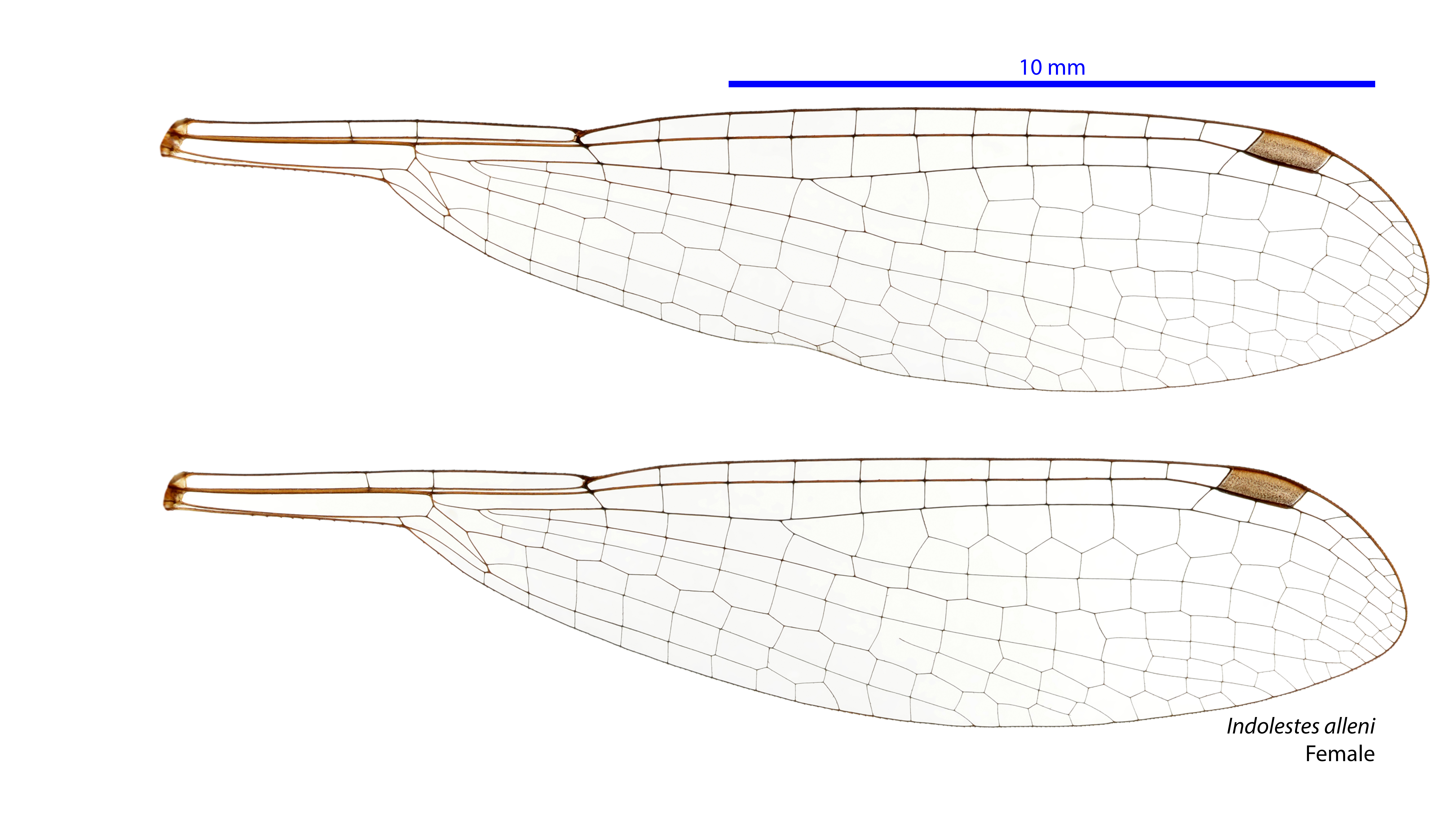
Female wings

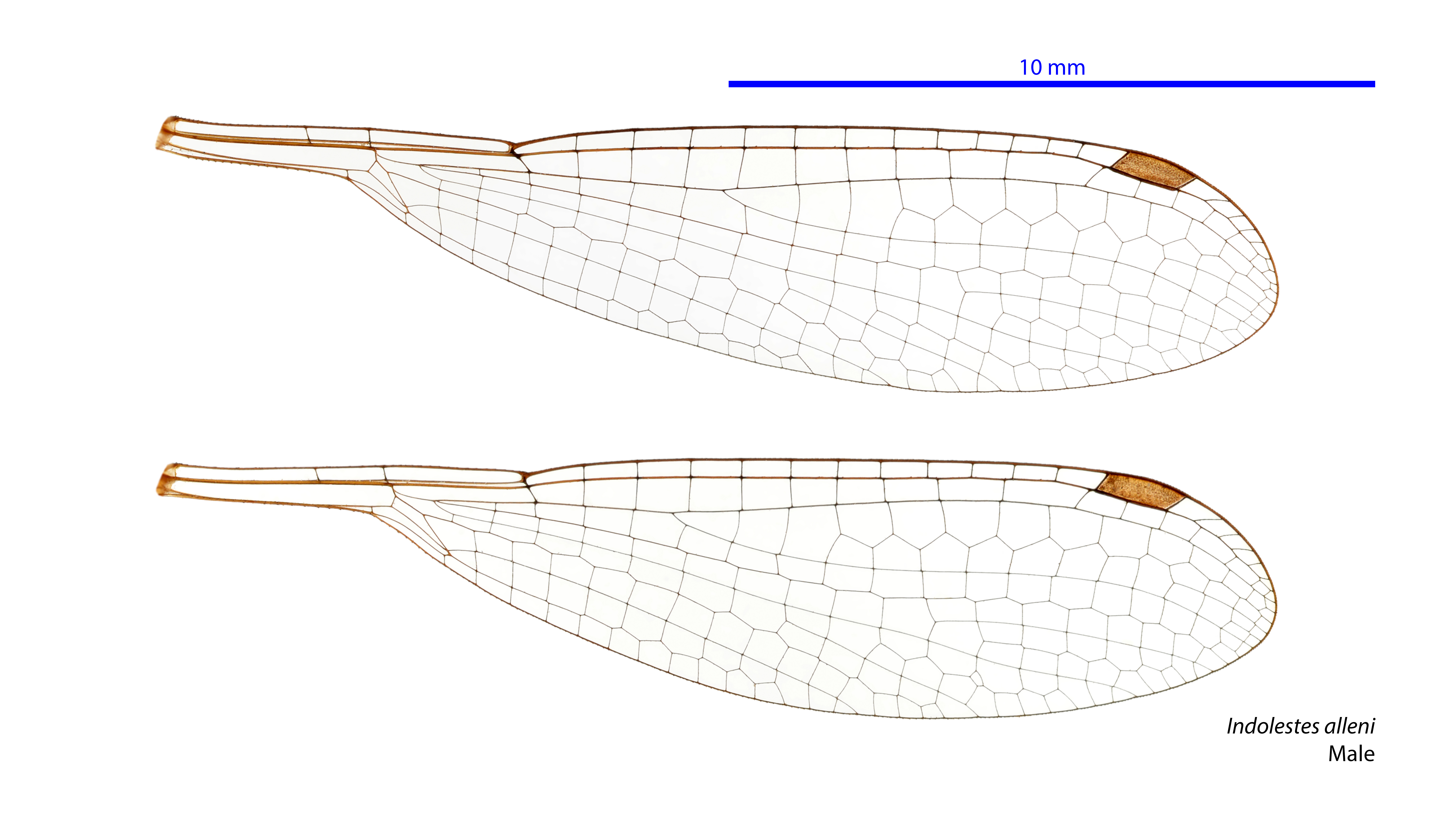
Male wings

== See also ==
- List of Odonata species of Australia
