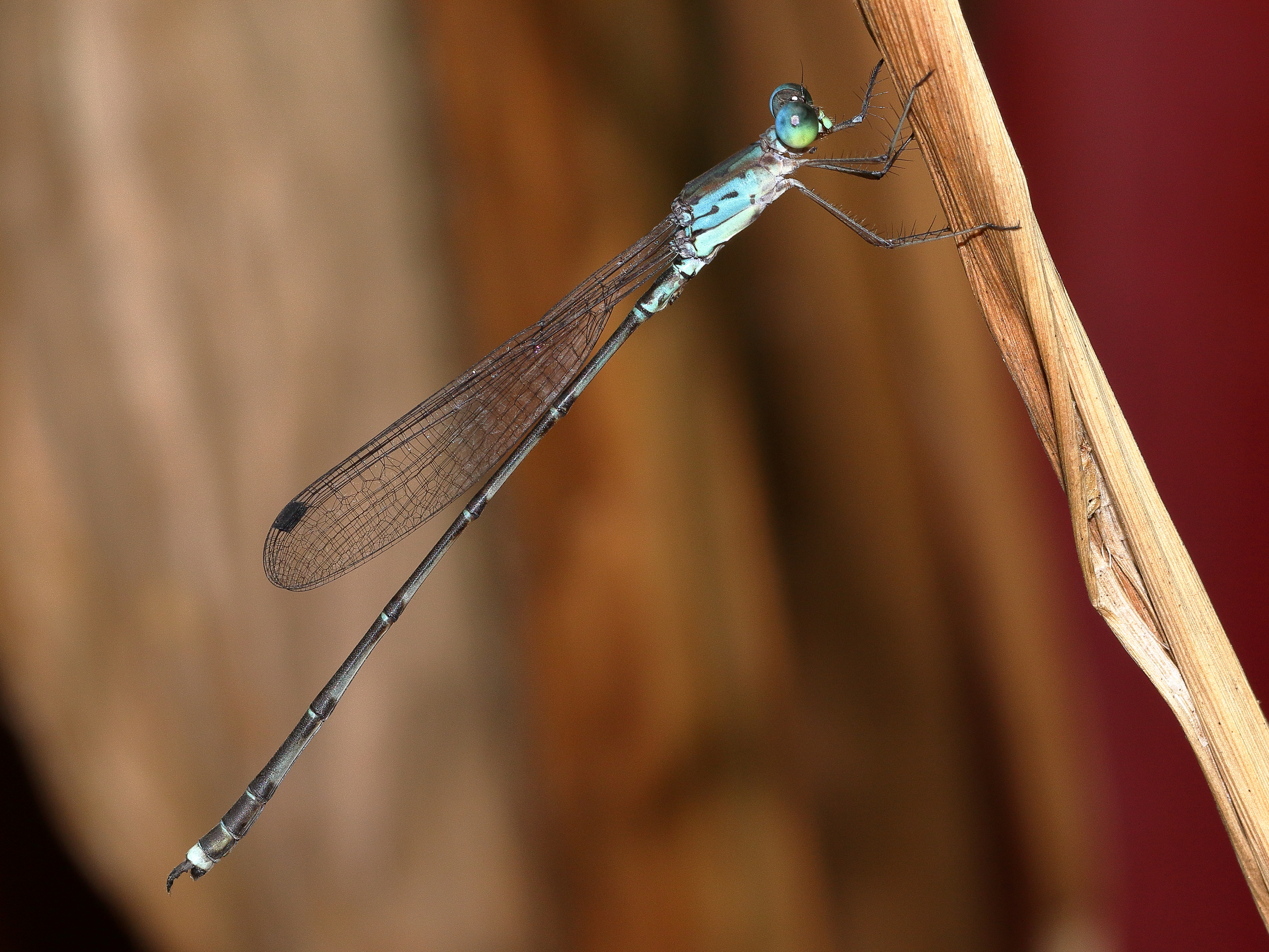
- Slender reedling, Cairns, Queensland

Conservation status
- Least Concern (IUCN 3.1)

Scientific classification
- Kingdom: Animalia
- Phylum: Arthropoda
- Clade: Pancrustacea
- Class: Insecta
- Order: Odonata
- Suborder: Zygoptera
- Family: Lestidae
- Genus: Indolestes
- Species: I. tenuissimus

Binomial name
- Indolestes tenuissimus (Tillyard, 1906)

Synonyms
- Lestes tenuissimus Tillyard, 1906

= Indolestes tenuissimus =

Slender reedling

Species of damselfly

Indolestes tenuissimus is a species of damselfly in the family Lestidae, commonly known as the slender reedling. It is found in north-eastern Australia, New Guinea and on Aru.

Its natural habitats are freshwater swamps, ponds and pools. The adult is a medium-sized damselfly (wingspan 50mm, length 45mm) with the thorax being mainly pale blue with darker patches. The abdomen is mid to dark grey on dorsal surfaces, lighter below, with segment ten forming a distinct pale band. The male superior anal appendages are sinuate. In Australia, the distribution is in suitable habitat in the north-eastern part of the continent from the tip of Cape York Peninsula to central Queensland. The taxon has been assessed in the IUCN Red List as being of least concern, and it appears in the Catalogue of Life.

== Etymology ==
The genus name Indolestes combines the Latin Indus ("India") with Lestes, a genus name derived from the Greek λῃστής (lēstēs, "robber"). Original members of this genus were from India.

The species name tenuissimus is the superlative form of the Latin tenuis ("thin"), meaning "thinnest", referring to its extremely long and slender abdomen.

== Gallery ==
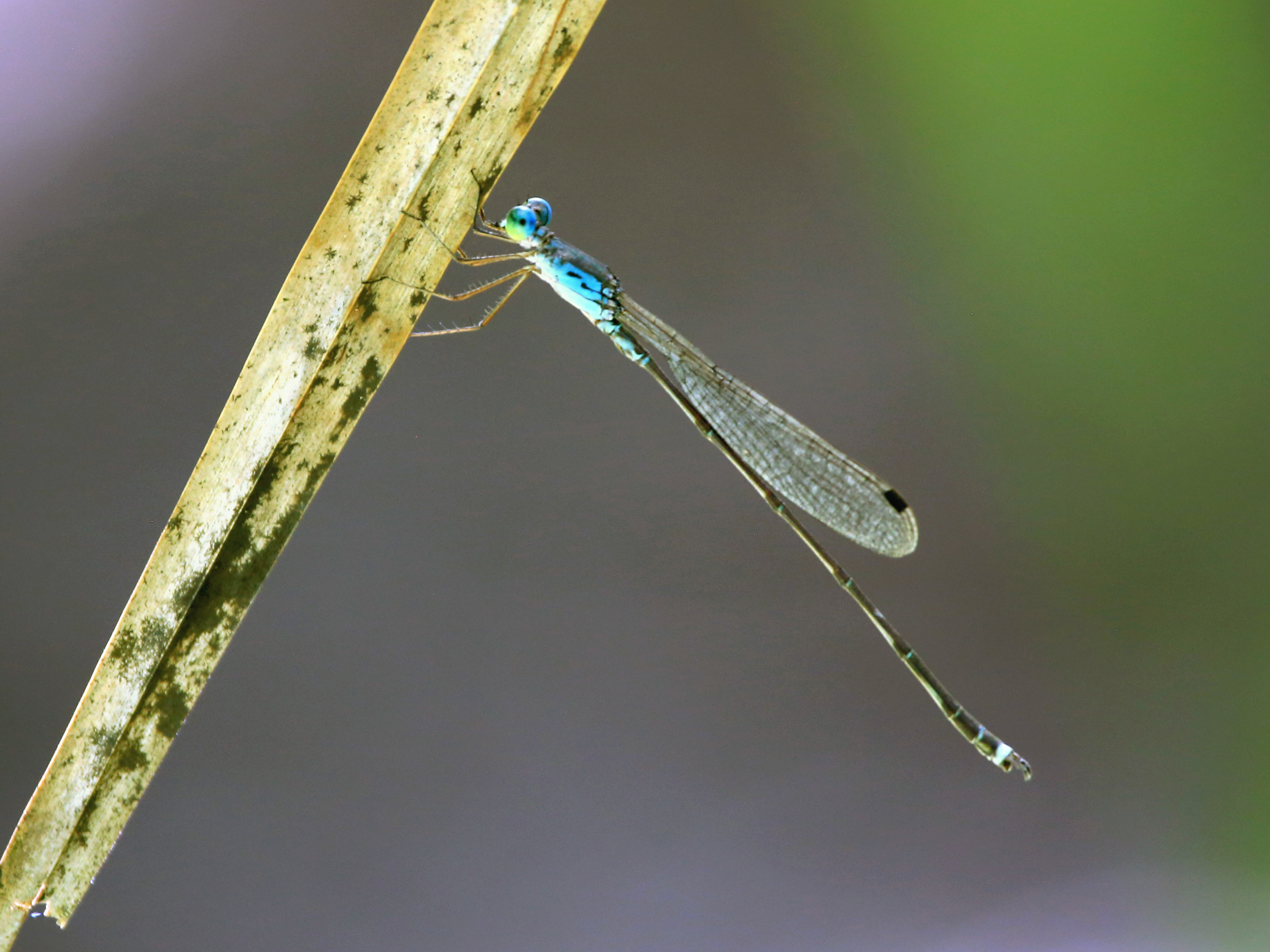
Lateral view, male

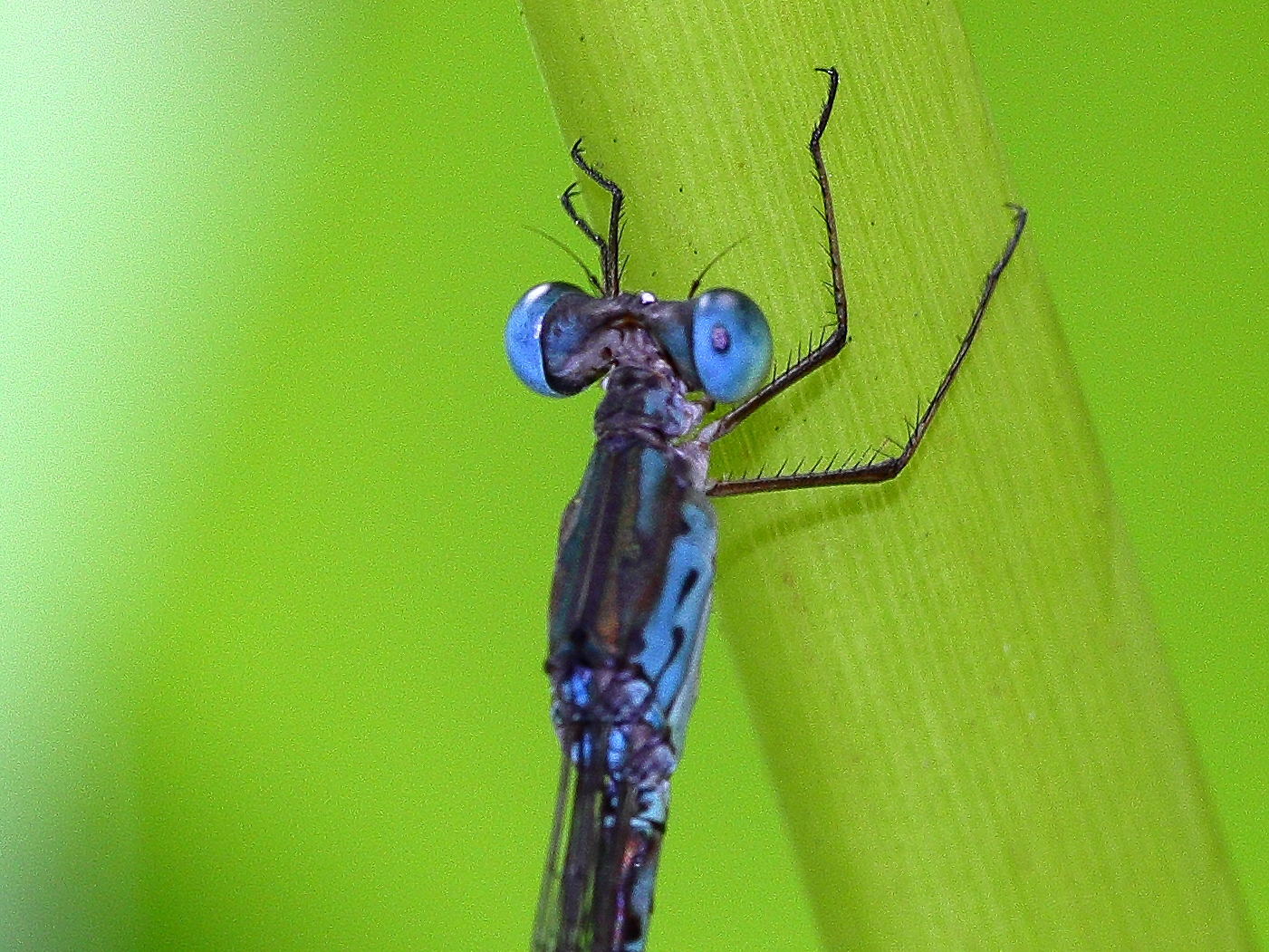
Close-up of head and thorax

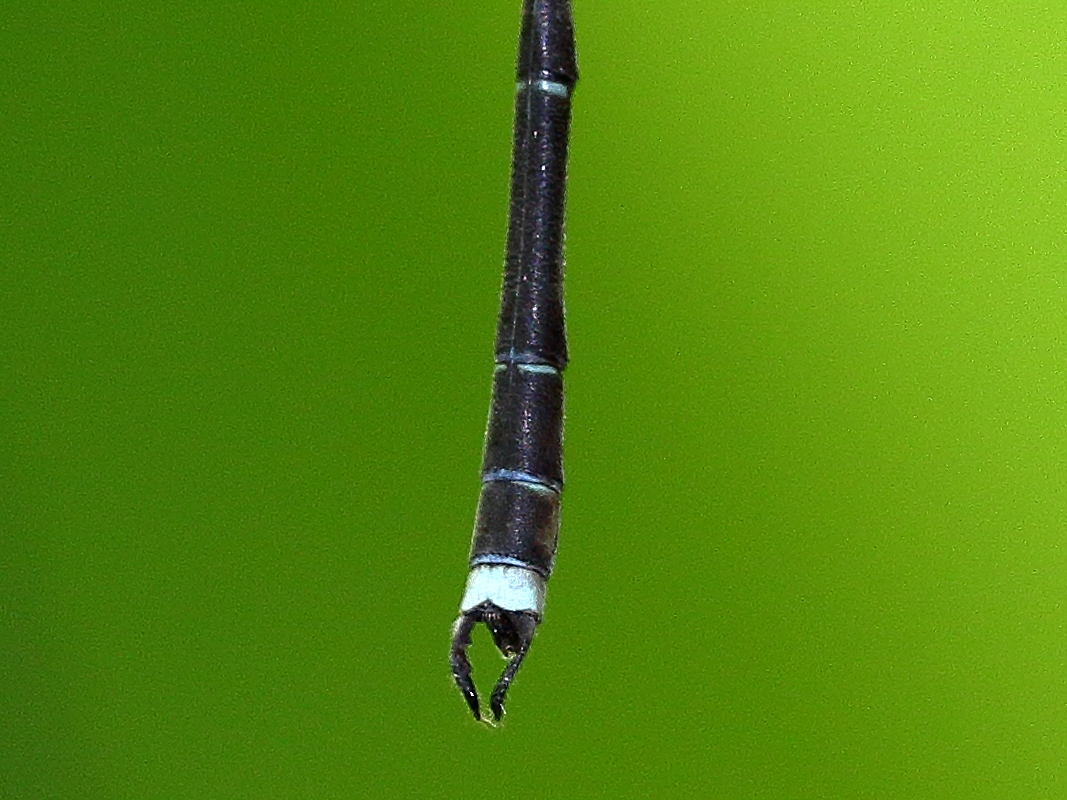
Close-up of male tail with sinuate appendages

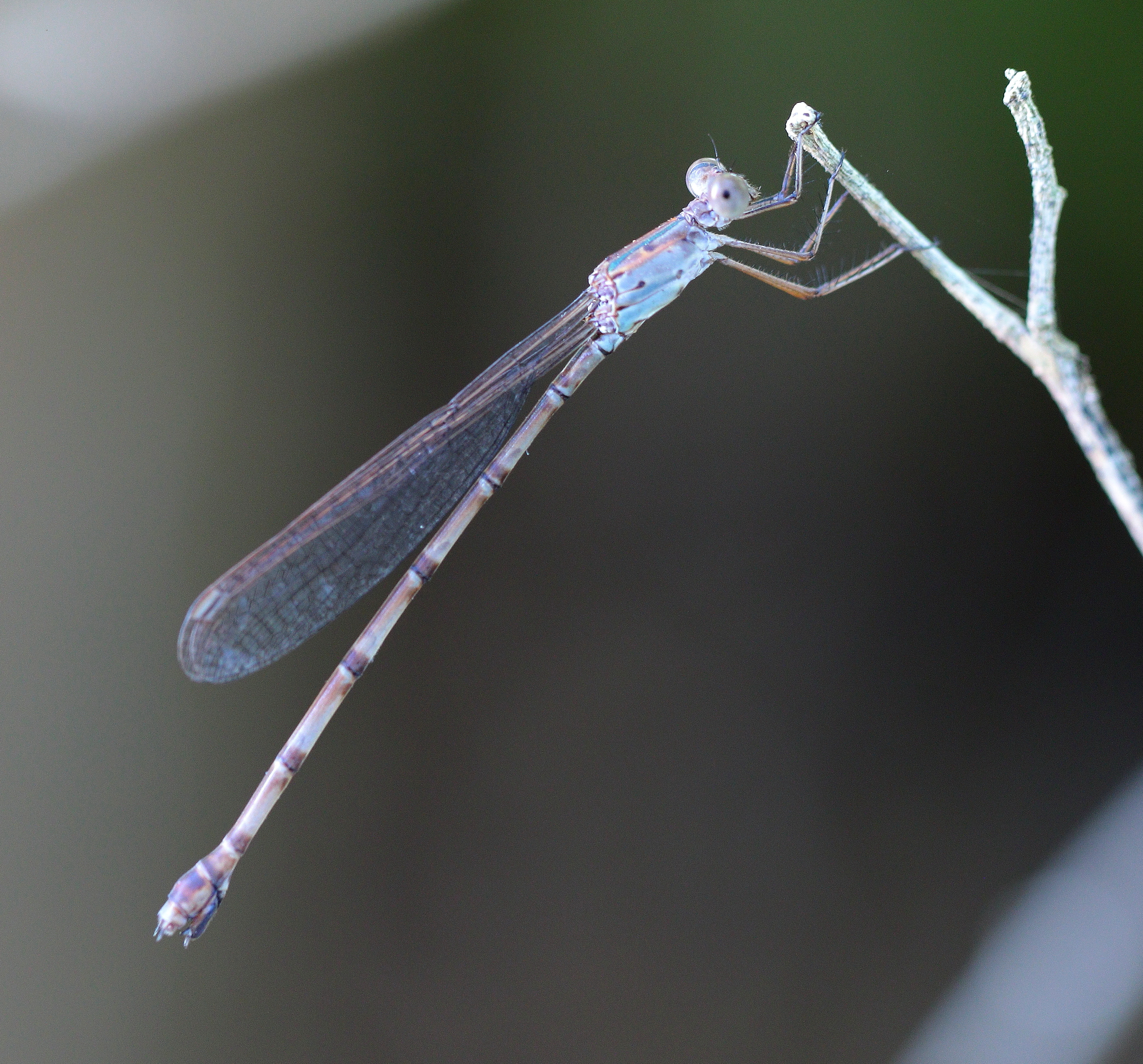
Female

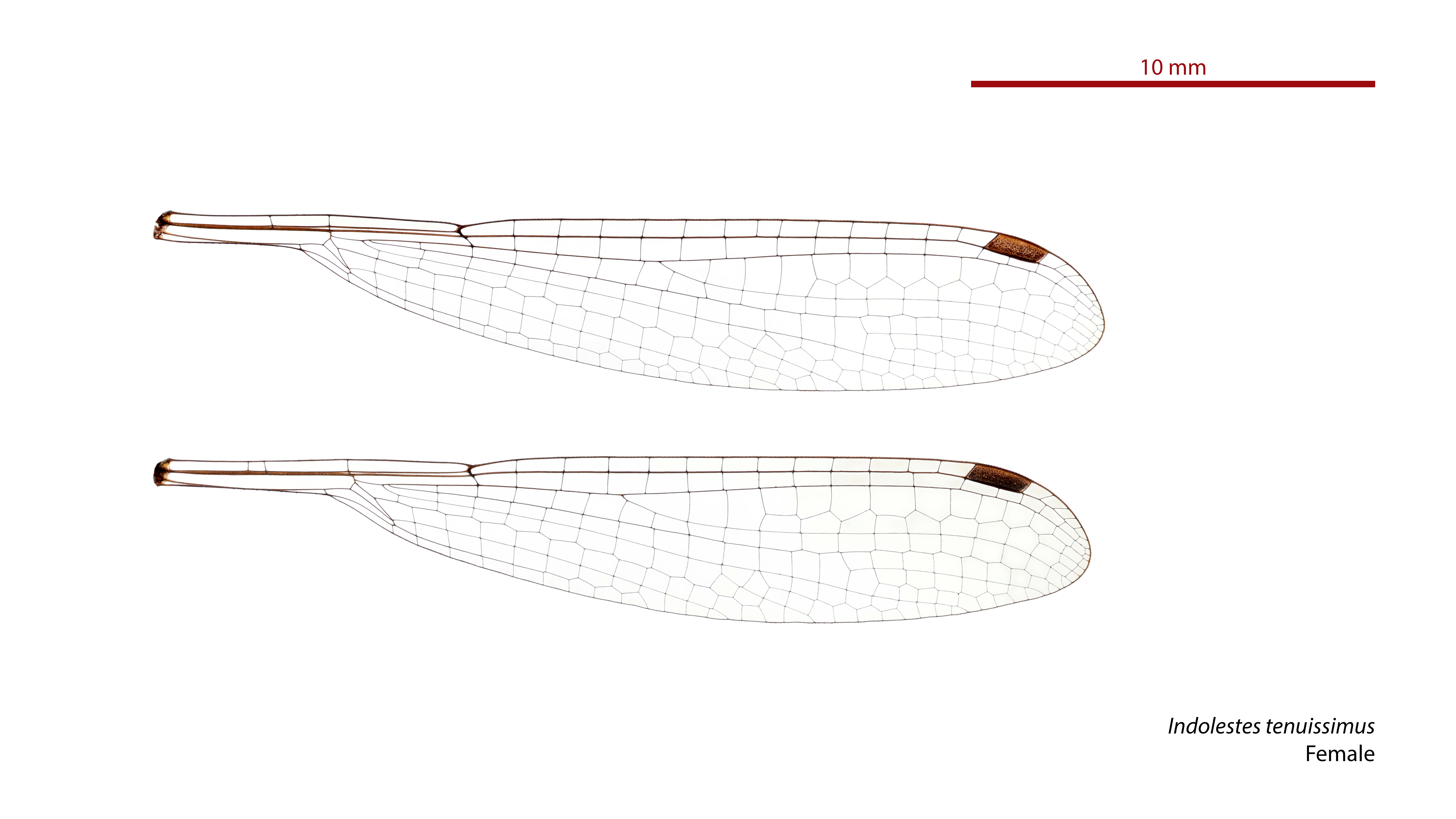
Female wings

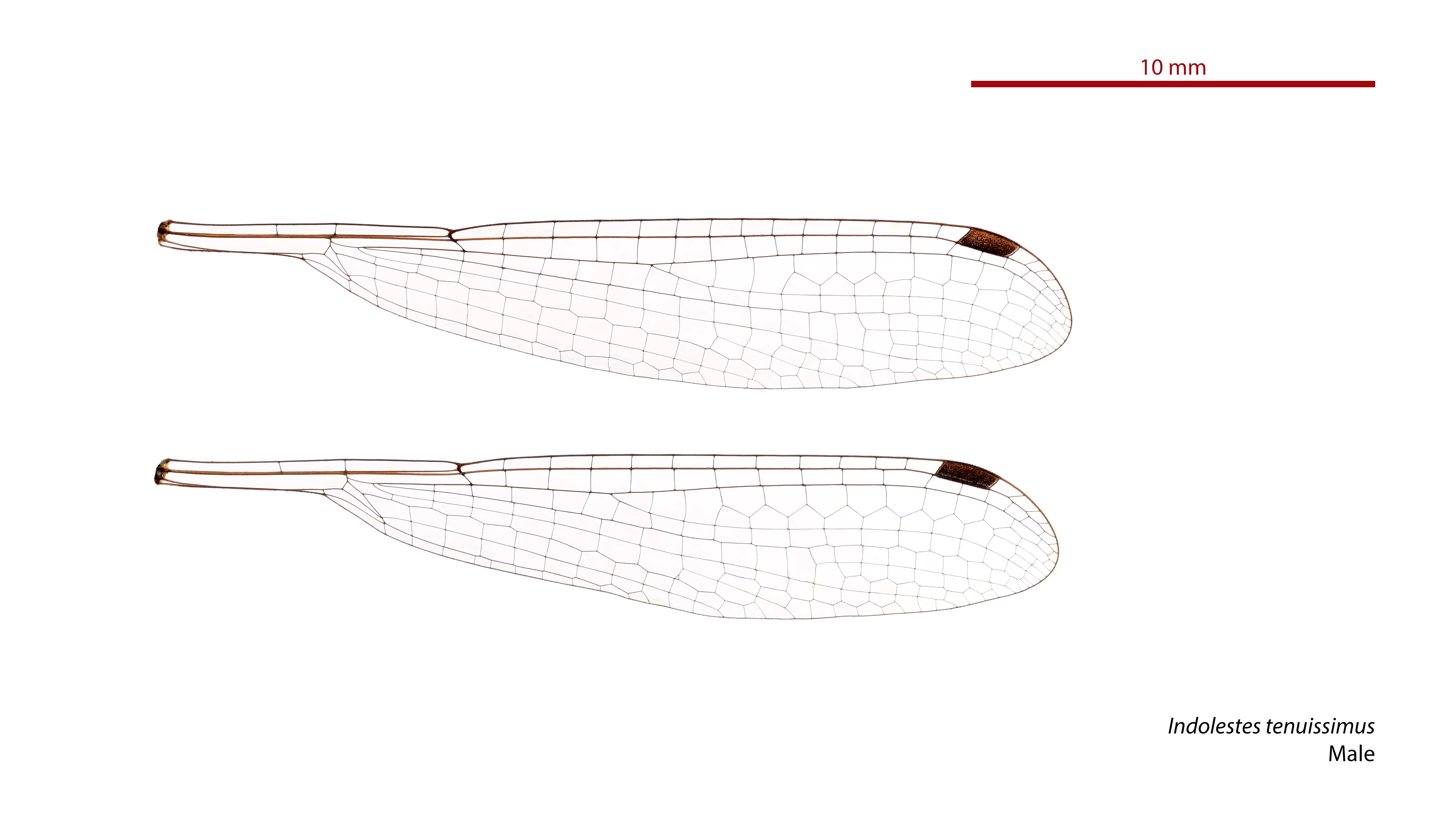
Male wings
