= Indolestes indicus =

Conservation status
- Near Threatened (IUCN 3.1)

Scientific classification
- Kingdom: Animalia
- Phylum: Arthropoda
- Clade: Pancrustacea
- Class: Insecta
- Order: Odonata
- Suborder: Zygoptera
- Family: Lestidae
- Genus: Indolestes
- Species: I. indicus

Binomial name
- Indolestes indicus Fraser, 1922

Species of damselfly

Indolestes indicus is a species of spreadwing in the damselfly family Lestidae.

The IUCN conservation status of Indolestes indicus is "NT", near threatened. The species may be considered threatened in the near future. The IUCN status was reviewed in 2010.
