= Indolestes boninensis =

Conservation status
- Critically Endangered (IUCN 3.1)

Scientific classification
- Kingdom: Animalia
- Phylum: Arthropoda
- Clade: Pancrustacea
- Class: Insecta
- Order: Odonata
- Suborder: Zygoptera
- Family: Lestidae
- Genus: Indolestes
- Species: I. boninensis

Binomial name
- Indolestes boninensis (Asahina, 1952)

Species of damselfly

Indolestes boninensis is a species of damselfly in the family Lestidae. It is endemic to Japan.
