= Indolestes divisus =

Scientific classification
- Kingdom: Animalia
- Phylum: Arthropoda
- Clade: Pancrustacea
- Class: Insecta
- Order: Odonata
- Suborder: Zygoptera
- Family: Lestidae
- Genus: Indolestes
- Species: I. divisus

Binomial name
- Indolestes divisus (Hagen in Selys, 1862)

Species of damselfly

Indolestes divisus, is a species of damselfly in the family Lestidae. It is endemic to Sri Lanka.
