= Indolestes inflatus =

Conservation status
- Data Deficient (IUCN 3.1)

Scientific classification
- Kingdom: Animalia
- Phylum: Arthropoda
- Clade: Pancrustacea
- Class: Insecta
- Order: Odonata
- Suborder: Zygoptera
- Family: Lestidae
- Genus: Indolestes
- Species: I. inflatus

Binomial name
- Indolestes inflatus (Fraser, 1933)

Species of damselfly

Indolestes inflatus is a species of spreadwing in the damselfly family Lestidae.
