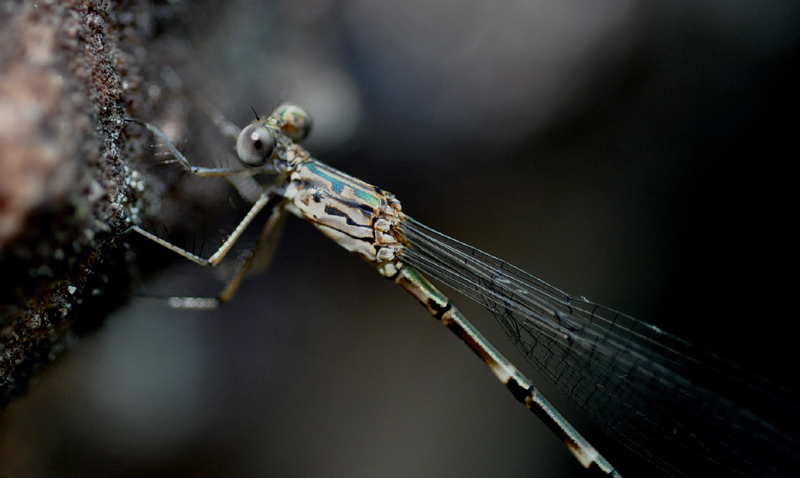
- Female, Northern Territory, Australia

Conservation status
- Vulnerable (IUCN 3.1)

Scientific classification
- Kingdom: Animalia
- Phylum: Arthropoda
- Clade: Pancrustacea
- Class: Insecta
- Order: Odonata
- Suborder: Zygoptera
- Family: Lestidae
- Genus: Indolestes
- Species: I. obiri

Binomial name
- Indolestes obiri Watson, 1979

= Indolestes obiri =

Cave reedling

Species of damselfly

Indolestes obiri is a species of damselfly in the family Lestidae, commonly known as a cave reedling. It is endemic to Arnhem Land, in Northern Territory, Australia, where it inhabits shallow, rocky pools.

Indolestes obiri is a medium-sized, dull-coloured damselfly.

== Etymology ==
The genus name Indolestes combines the Latin Indus ("India") with Lestes, a genus name derived from the Greek λῃστής (lēstēs, "robber"). Original members of this genus were from India.

The species name obiri is for Obiri Rock in Northern Territory, habitat of this cave-dwelling damselfly.

== Gallery ==
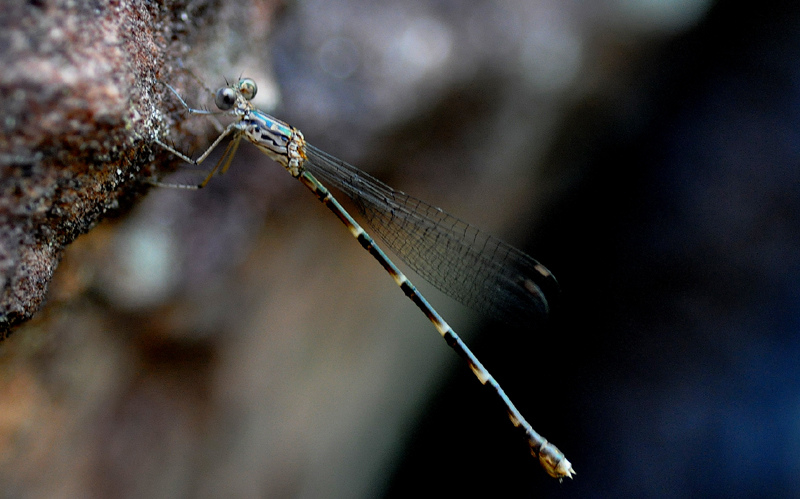
Female

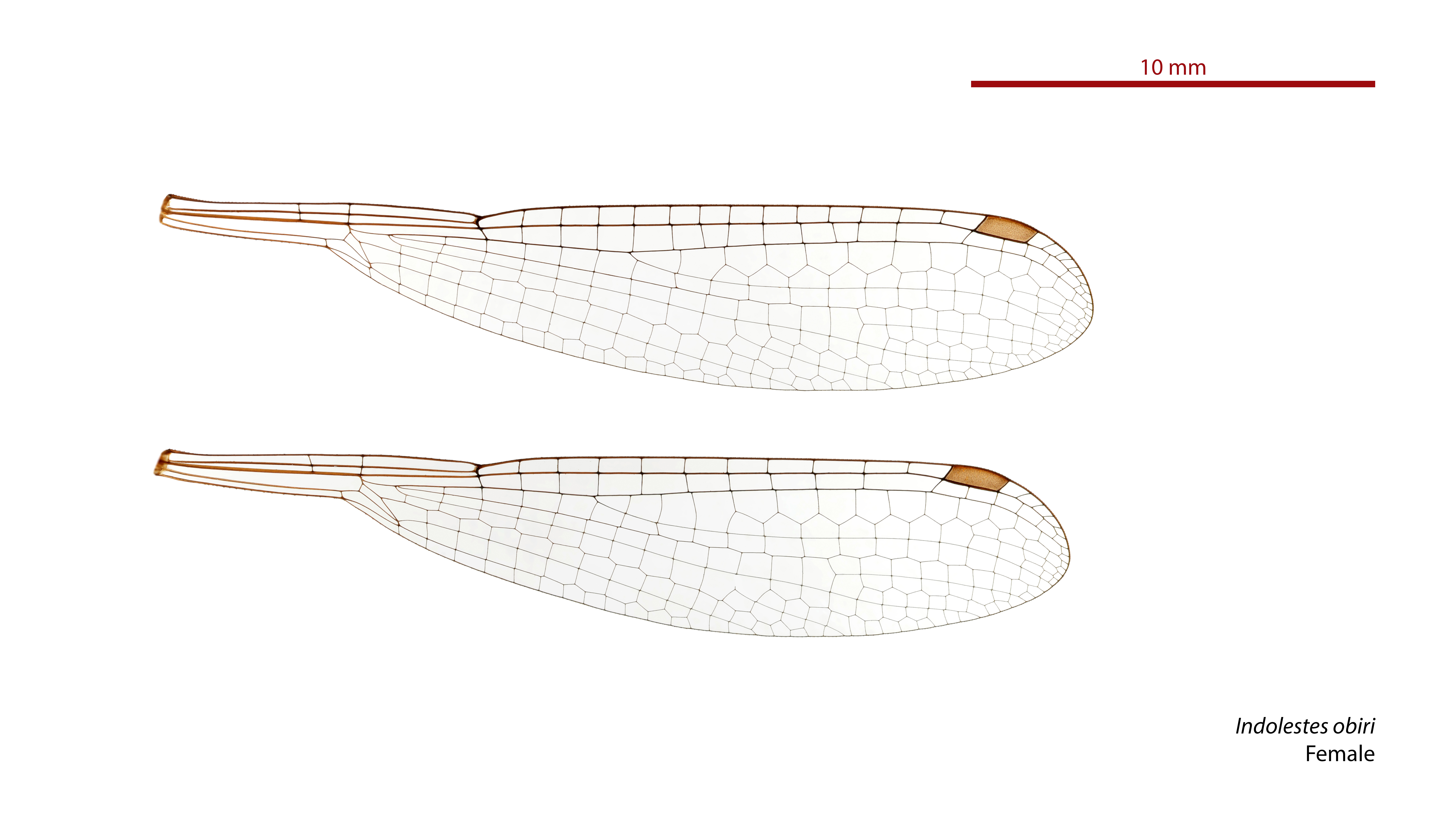
Female wings

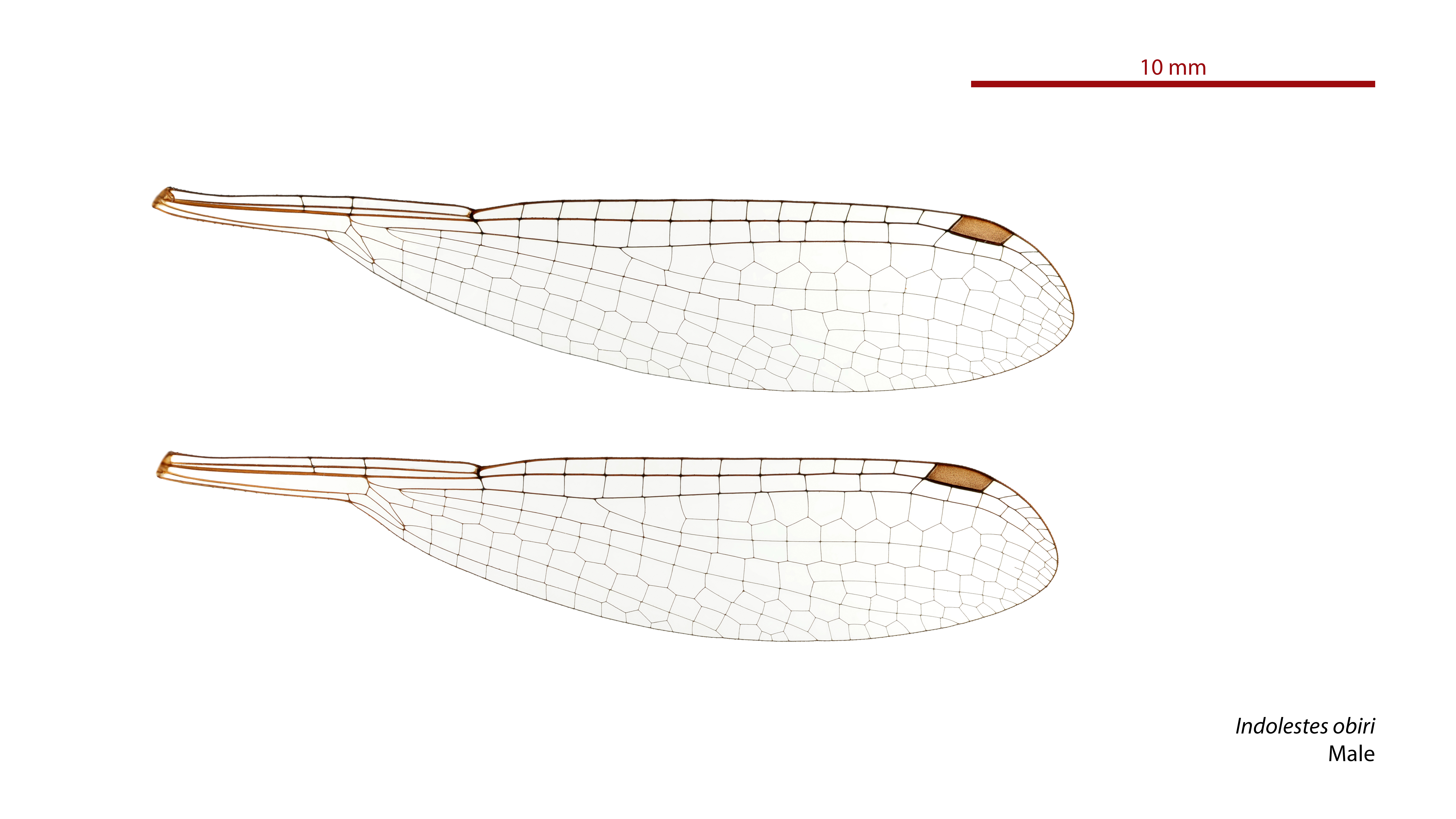
Male wings

== See also ==
- List of Odonata species of Australia
