= Indolestes birmanus =

Scientific classification
- Kingdom: Animalia
- Phylum: Arthropoda
- Clade: Pancrustacea
- Class: Insecta
- Order: Odonata
- Suborder: Zygoptera
- Family: Lestidae
- Genus: Indolestes
- Species: I. birmanus

Binomial name
- Indolestes birmanus (Selys, 1891)

Species of damselfly

Indolestes birmanus is a species of spreadwing in the damselfly family Lestidae.
