= Maurits Lieftinck =

Dutch curator and biologist

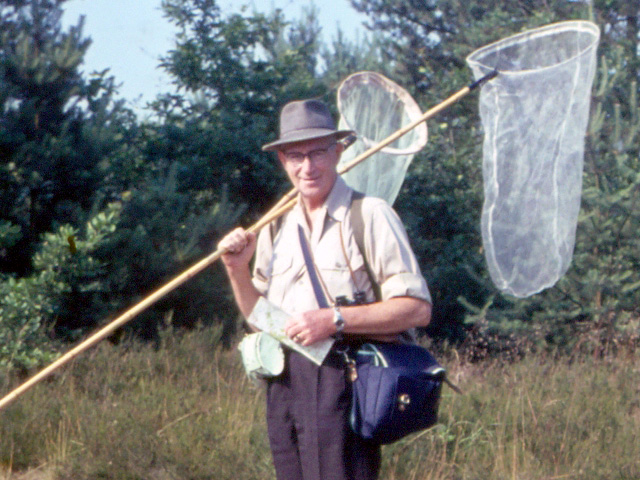
On a collection trip

Maurits Anne Lieftinck informally Maus Lieftinck (18 February 1904 – 13 April 1985) was a Dutch entomologist who specialized in the Odonata, particularly in Southeast Asia, working from the Bogor Museum where he worked for a significant period.

== Life ==
Lieftinck was born in Amsterdam, the second son of tobacco-importer Gerrard and Elsabet née Esser. He was educated at the Amsterdam Lycaeum and at the University of Amsterdam (graduating in 1929). He became interested in natural history and joined the Netherlands Entomological Society in 1919 serving as the editor of Amoeba, the periodical of the Netherlands Youth Federation for Nature Study that he founded in 1921. He published on the dragonflies and damselflies of the Netherlands and left his collections to the Amsterdam Museum in 1929.

He moved to the Buitenzorg Museum in Dutch Java and served as in-charge of the Laboratory of Marine Research in Batavia. He became a head of the Buitenzorg Museum in 1939 and worked there until 1954. He was taken prisoner from 1942 to 1946 by invading Japanese forces. He then took leave to travel around Europe before returning to the Museum, now called the Bogor Museum. He collected insect specimens across Southeast Asia and described many new species.

In 1954 he moved back to Europe and became a curator at the Leiden Museum. He retired in 1969 and was appointed Officer in the Order of Oranje-Nassau. He went to live in Rhenen with his wife Cornelia Maria van Veen and continued to research and publish.
