= List of damselflies of the world (Platycnemididae) =

- Allocnemis leucosticta
- Allocnemis mitwabae
- Arabicnemis caerulea
- Asthenocnemis linnaei
- Asthenocnemis stephanodera
- Calicnemia carminea
- Calicnemia chaoi
- Calicnemia chaseni
- Calicnemia erythromelas
- Calicnemia eximia
- Calicnemia haksik
- Calicnemia imitans
- Calicnemia miles
- Calicnemia miniata
- Calicnemia mortoni
- Calicnemia mukherjeei
- Calicnemia nipalica
- Calicnemia pulverulans
- Calicnemia rectangulata
- Calicnemia sinenis
- Calicnemia sudhaae
- Calicnemia uenoi
- Calicnemia zhuae
- Coeliccia acco
- Coeliccia albicauda
- Coeliccia ambigua
- Coeliccia arcuata
- Coeliccia axinocercus
- Coeliccia bimaculata
- Coeliccia boecttcheri
- Coeliccia borneensis
- Coeliccia brachysticta
- Coeliccia campioni
- Coeliccia chromothorox
- Coeliccia coomansi
- Coeliccia cyaneothorax
- Coeliccia cyanomelas
- Coeliccia ddidyma
- Coeliccia dierli
- Coeliccia dinoceras
- Coeliccia doisuthepensi
- Coeliccia dorothea
- Coeliccia erici
- Coeliccia exoleta
- Coeliccia flavicauda
- Coeliccia flavostriata
- Coeliccia fraseri
- Coeliccia furcata
- Coeliccia galbina
- Coeliccia kazukaoe
- Coeliccia kimurai
- Coeliccia lieftincki
- Coeliccia loogali
- Coeliccia marcostigma
- Coeliccia megumii
- Coeliccia membranipes
- Coeliccia mingxiensis
- Coeliccia montona
- Coeliccia nemoricola
- Coeliccia nigrescens
- Coeliccia nigrohamata
- Coeliccia octogesima
- Coeliccia onoi
- Coeliccia palawana
- Coeliccia poungyi
- Coeliccia pracritii
- Coeliccia pyriformis
- Coeliccia renifera
- Coeliccia resecta
- Coeliccia rossi
- Coeliccia rotundata
- Coeliccia ryukyuensis
- Coeliccia sarbottama
- Coeliccia satoi
- Coeliccia schmidti
- Coeliccia scutellum
- Coeliccia sexmaculata
- Coeliccia svihleri
- Coeliccia tomokunii
- Coeliccia uenoi
- Coeliccia vacca
- Coeliccia werneri
- Coeliccia yamasakii
- Copera annulata
- Copera chantaburii
- Copera ciliata
- Copera imbricata
- Copera marginipes
- Copera rubripes
- Copera superplatypes
- Copera tokyoensis
- Copera vittata
- Cyanocnemis aureofrons
- Denticnemis bicolor
- Idiocnemis adelbertensis
- Idiocnemis australis
- Idiocnemis bidentata
- Idiocnemis chloropleura
- Idiocnemis dagnyae
- Idiocnemis fissidens
- Idiocnemis huonensis
- Idiocnmeis inaequidens
- Idiocnemis inornata
- Idiocnemis kimminsi
- Idiocnemis leonardi
- Idiocnemis louisidensis
- Idiocnemis mertoni
- Idiocnemis nigriventris
- Idiocnemis obliterata
- Idiocnemis polhemi
- Idiocnmeis pruinescens
- Idiocnemis strumidens
- Idiocnemis zebrina
- Indocnemis orang
- Leptocnemis cyanops
- Lieftinckia isabellae
- Lieftinckia kimminsi
- Lieftinckia lairdi
- Lieftinckia malaitae
- Lieftinckia ramosa
- Lieftinckia salomonis
- Lochmaeocnemis malacodora
- Mesocnemis dupuyi
- Mesocnemis robusta
- Mesocnemis singularis
- Mesocnemis tisi
- Metacnemis angusta
- Metacnmeis secundaris
- Metacnemis valida
- Oreocnemis phoenix
- Palaiargia alcedo
- Palaiargia arses
- Palaiargia carnifex
- Palaiargia ceyx
- Palaiargia charmosyna
- Palaiargia eclecta
- Palaiargia eos
- Palaiargia ernstmayri
- Palaiargia halcyon
- Palaiargia humida
- Palaiargia melidora
- Palaiargia micropsitta
- Palaiargia myzomela
- Palaiargia nasiterna
- Palaiargia obiensis
- Palaiargia optata
- Palaiargia perimecosoma
- Palaiargia rubropunctata
- Palaiargia stellata
- Palaiargia tanysiptera
- Paracnemis alluaudi
- Paramecocnemis erythrostigma
- Paramecocnemis stilla-cruoris
- Platycnemis acutipennis
- Platycnemis alatipes
- Platycnemis agrioides
- Platycnemis aurantipes
- Platycnemis bilineata
- Platycnemis brunneioctopunctata
- Platycnemis congolensis
- Platycnemis dealbata
- Platycnemis echigoana
- Platycnemis escherichi
- Platycnemis flavipes
- Platycnemis foliacea
- Platycnemis foliosa
- Platycnemis guttifera
- Platycnemis hova
- Platycnemis kervillei
- Platycnemis latipes
- Platycnemis longiventris
- Platycnemis malgassica
- Platycnemis mauriciana
- Platycnemis melanus
- Platycnemis nitidula
- Platycnemis nyansana
- Platycnemis pennipes
- Platycnemis phasmovolan
- Platycnemis phyllopoda
- Platycnemis pierrati
- Platycnemis protostictoides
- Platycnemis pseudalatipes
- Platycnemis rufipes
- Platycnemis sanguinipes
- Platycnemis sikassoensis
- Platycnemis subdilatata
- Platycnemis xanthopus
- Rhyacocnemis leonorae
- Rhyacocnemis prothoracica
- Rhyacocnemis sufficiens
- Risiocnemis antoniae
- Risiocnemis appendiculata
- Risiocnemis arator
- Risiocnemis ashaninai
- Risiocnemis atripes
- Risiocnemis atropurpurea
- Risiocnemis calceata
- Risiocnemis confusa
- Risiocnemis elegans
- Risiocnemis erythrura
- Risiocnemis flammea
- Risiocnemis fuligifrons
- Risiocnemis gracilis
- Risiocnemis haematopus
- Risiocnemis ignea
- Risiocnemis inisa
- Risiocnemis kraseri
- Risiocnemis kiautai
- Risiocnmeis laguna
- Risiocnemis melanops
- Risiocnemis moroensis
- Risiocnemis nigra
- Risiocnemis odobeni
- Risiocnemis pistor
- Risiocnemis plebeja
- Risiocnemis polilloensi
- Risiocnemis praeusta
- Risiocnemis pulchra
- Risiocnemis rolandmuelleri
- Risiocnemis rubricercus
- Risiocnemis rubripes
- Risiocnemis seidenschwarzi
- Risiocnemis serrata
- Risiocnemis siniae
- Risiocnemis tendipes
- Risiocnemis varians
- Salomoncnemis gerdae
- Sinocnemis dumonti
- Sinocnemis henanese
- Sinocnemis yangbingi
- Stenocnemis pachystigma
- Thaumatagrion funereum
- Torrenticnemis filicornis
