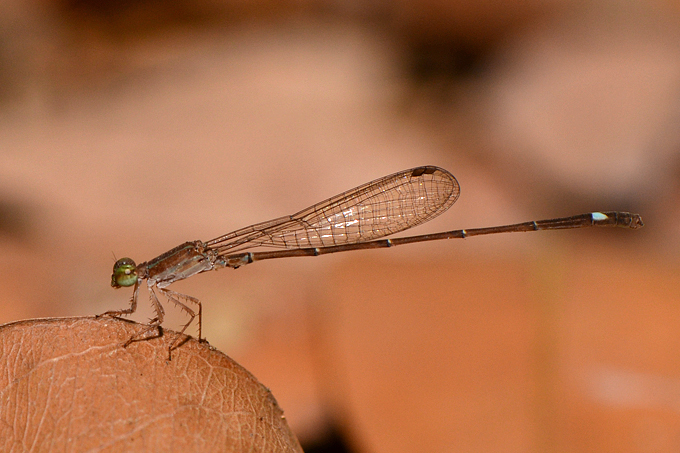
- Male
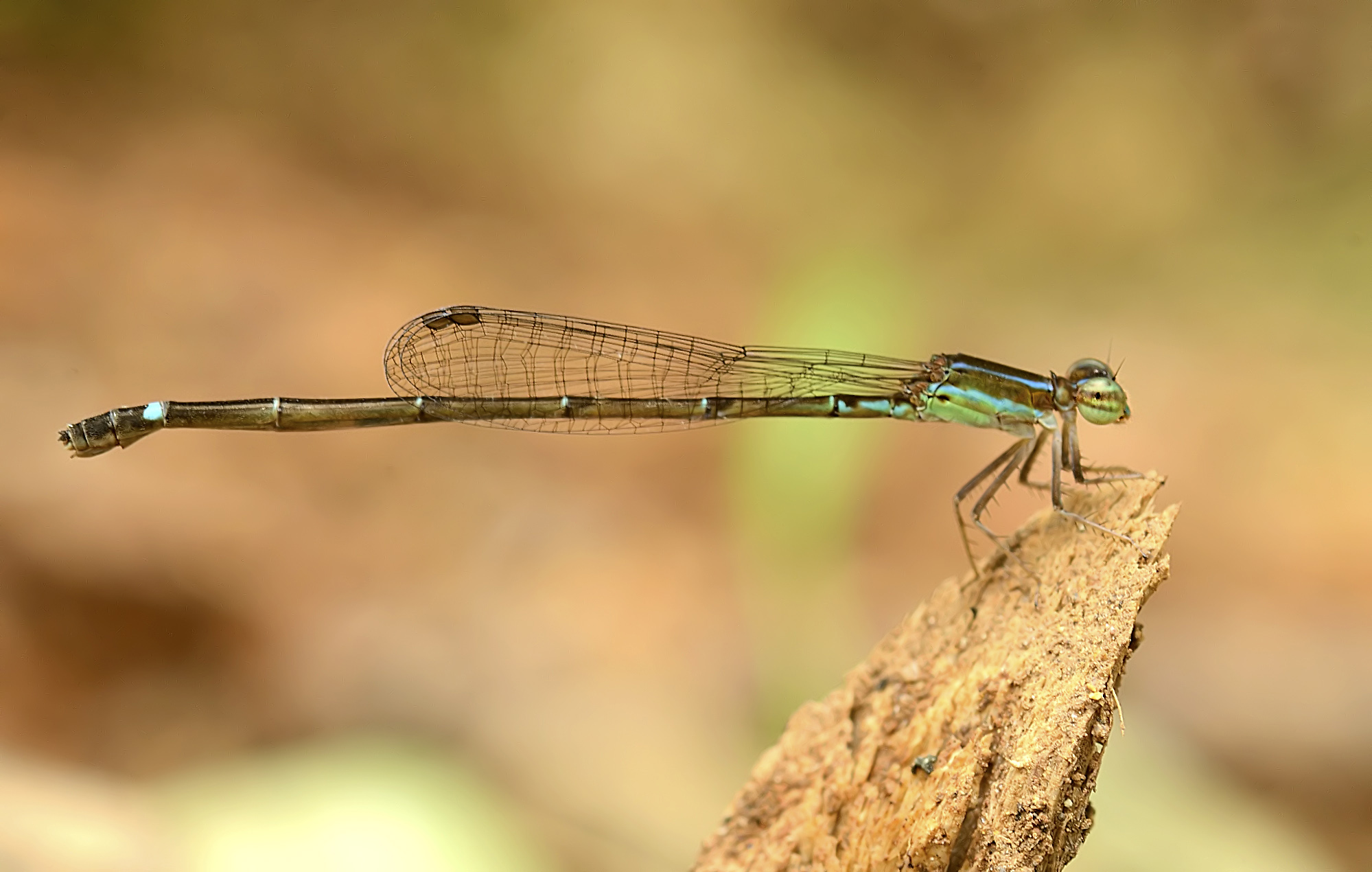
- Female

Conservation status
- Data Deficient (IUCN 3.1)

Scientific classification
- Kingdom: Animalia
- Phylum: Arthropoda
- Class: Insecta
- Order: Odonata
- Suborder: Zygoptera
- Family: Coenagrionidae
- Genus: Mortonagrion
- Species: M. varralli

Binomial name
- Mortonagrion varralli Fraser, 1920

= Mortonagrion varralli =

Species of damselfly

Mortonagrion varralli, the brown dartlet, is a species of damselfly in the family Coenagrionidae, endemic to India. The insect is named after Frederic Charles Fraser's wife, Ethel Grace Fraser (née Varrall) (1881–1960), a constant companion of his collecting trips in India.

== Description and habitat ==
It is a small damselfly with ground-colour head and brown capped grey eyes. Its thorax is pale brown with a narrow antehumeral pale blue stripe, followed by pale blue at base. Abdomen is reddish-brown; 8th segment has a broader pale sky-blue basal annule which extends apically on each side. Female is similar to the male.

The species is commonly found at sea-level or on the foothills of the Western Ghats. Similarly to species in the genus Copera, it prefers the dense undergrowth.

== See also ==
- List of odonates of India
- List of odonata of Kerala
