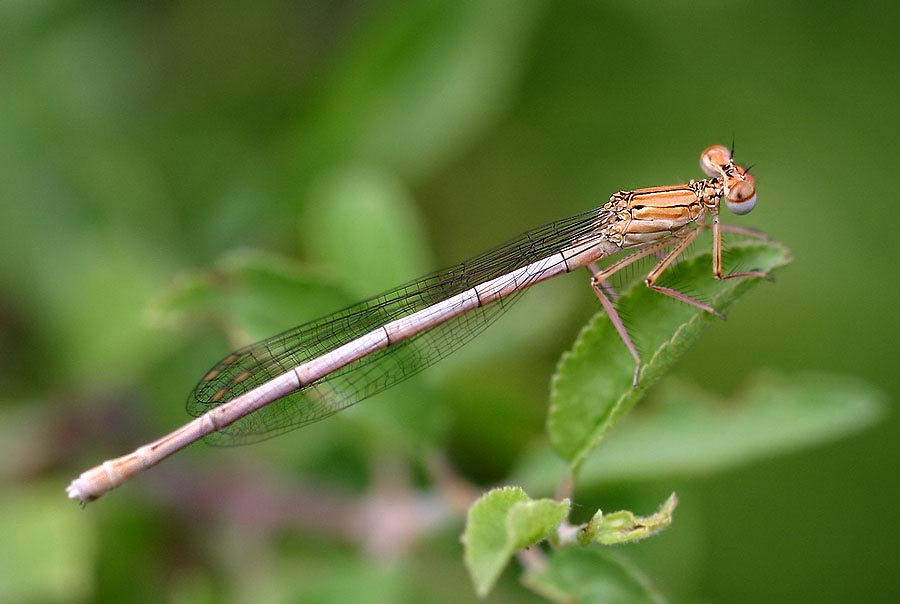
- Platycnemis pennipes

Scientific classification
- Kingdom: Animalia
- Phylum: Arthropoda
- Clade: Pancrustacea
- Class: Insecta
- Order: Odonata
- Suborder: Zygoptera
- Family: Platycnemididae
- Genus: Platycnemis; Burmeister, 1839

= Platycnemis =

Featherlegs

Genus of insects

Platycnemis is a genus of damselflies in the family Platycnemididae. Species of Platycnemis occur across the Palearctic region, extending from western Europe through Asia. Members of the genus are commonly known as featherlegs because of the distinctively broadened and often pale-coloured legs, especially in males.

== Description ==
Platycnemis are slender damselflies with relatively broad wings and conspicuously expanded tibiae on the middle and hind legs. In many species the tibiae are white or pale blue and are used in courtship displays. Adults are typically found along streams, rivers and other freshwater habitats.

== Taxonomic history ==
The genus was established by Burmeister in 1839 and subsequently diagnosed in detail by Charpentier (1840), who designated Platycnemis pennipes as the type species and derived the name from the Greek words for "broad" and "shin". Early classifications placed Platycnemis within a distinct group of damselflies characterised by broadened tibiae. In 1904, Bianchi recognised a subfamily Platycnemidinae containing Platycnemis and Psilocnemis.

Fraser (1957) treated Platycnemis as the type genus of the subfamily Platycnemininae and contrasted it with a more heterogeneous assemblage of genera placed in Calicneminae. Molecular studies later confirmed that Platycnemis belongs within the core lineage of Platycnemididae and remains the type genus of the family.

== Etymology ==
The genus name Platycnemis is derived from the Greek πλατύς (platys, "broad" or "flat") and κνημίς (knēmis, "leg" or "shin"), referring to the expanded tibiae characteristic of many species.

== Species ==
The following species are currently placed in Platycnemis:

- Platycnemis acutipennis Selys, 1841 – Orange Featherleg
- Platycnemis dealbata Selys in Selys & Hagen, 1850 – Ivory featherleg
- Platycnemis echigoana Asahina, 1955
- Platycnemis foliacea Selys, 1886
- Platycnemis kervillei (Martin, 1909) – Powdered featherleg, Kerville's featherleg
- Platycnemis latipes Rambur, 1842 – White featherleg
- Platycnemis oedipus (von Eichwald, 1830)
- Platycnemis pennipes (Pallas, 1771) – Blue featherleg, White-legged Damselfly
- Platycnemis phasmovolans Hämäläinen, 2003
- Platycnemis phyllopoda Djakonov, 1926
- Platycnemis sasakii Asahina, 1949
- Platycnemis subdilatata Selys, 1849 – Barbary featherleg

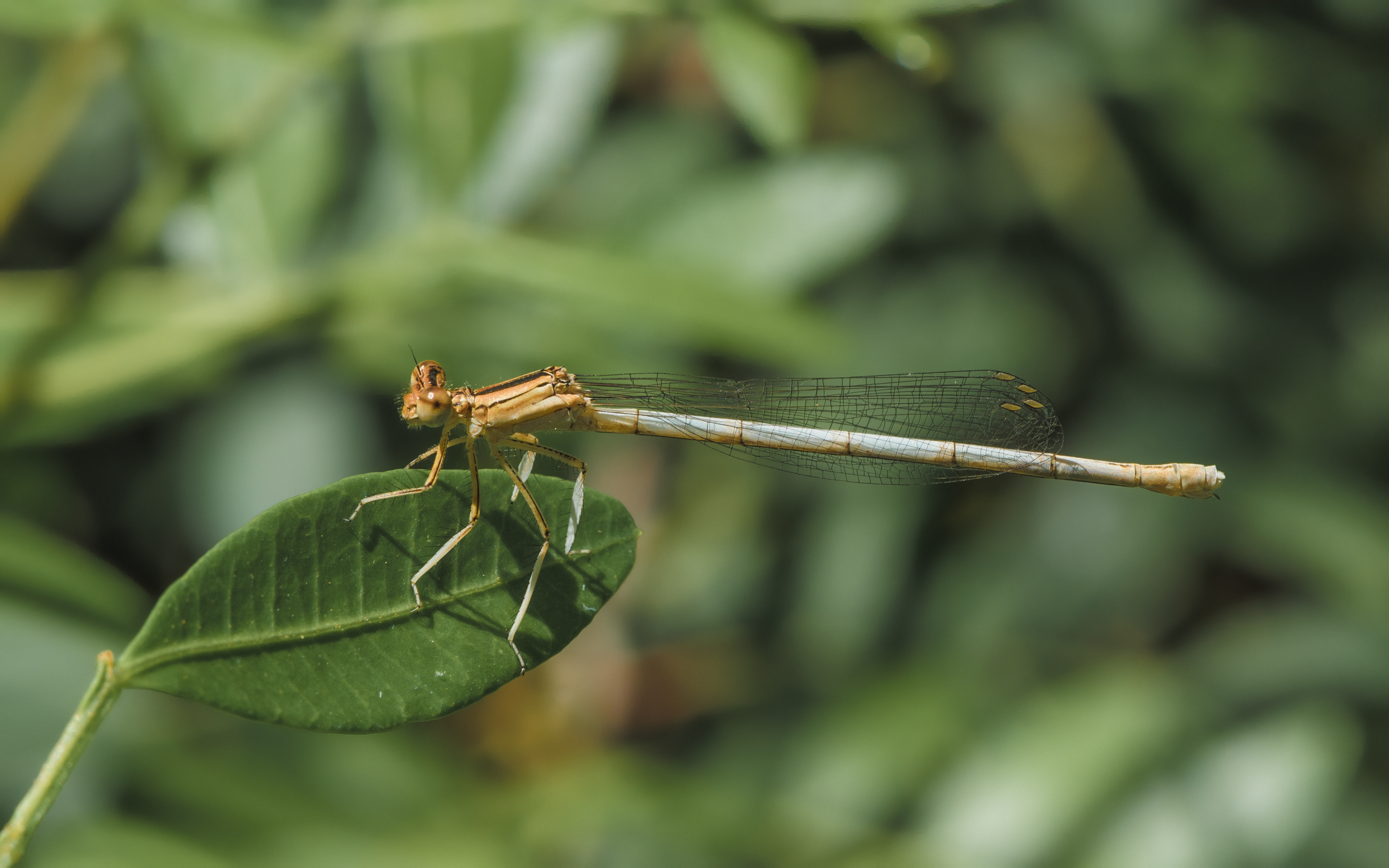
Platycnemis latipes
