= Mesocnemis saralisa =

Conservation status
- Least Concern (IUCN 3.1)

Scientific classification
- Kingdom: Animalia
- Phylum: Arthropoda
- Class: Insecta
- Order: Odonata
- Suborder: Zygoptera
- Family: Platycnemididae
- Genus: Mesocnemis
- Species: M. saralisa

Binomial name
- Mesocnemis saralisa Dijkstra, 2008

Species of damselfly

Mesocnemis saralisa is a species of white-legged damselfly in the family Platycnemididae.

The IUCN conservation status of Mesocnemis saralisa is "LC", least concern, with no immediate threat to the species' survival. The IUCN status was reviewed in 2017.
