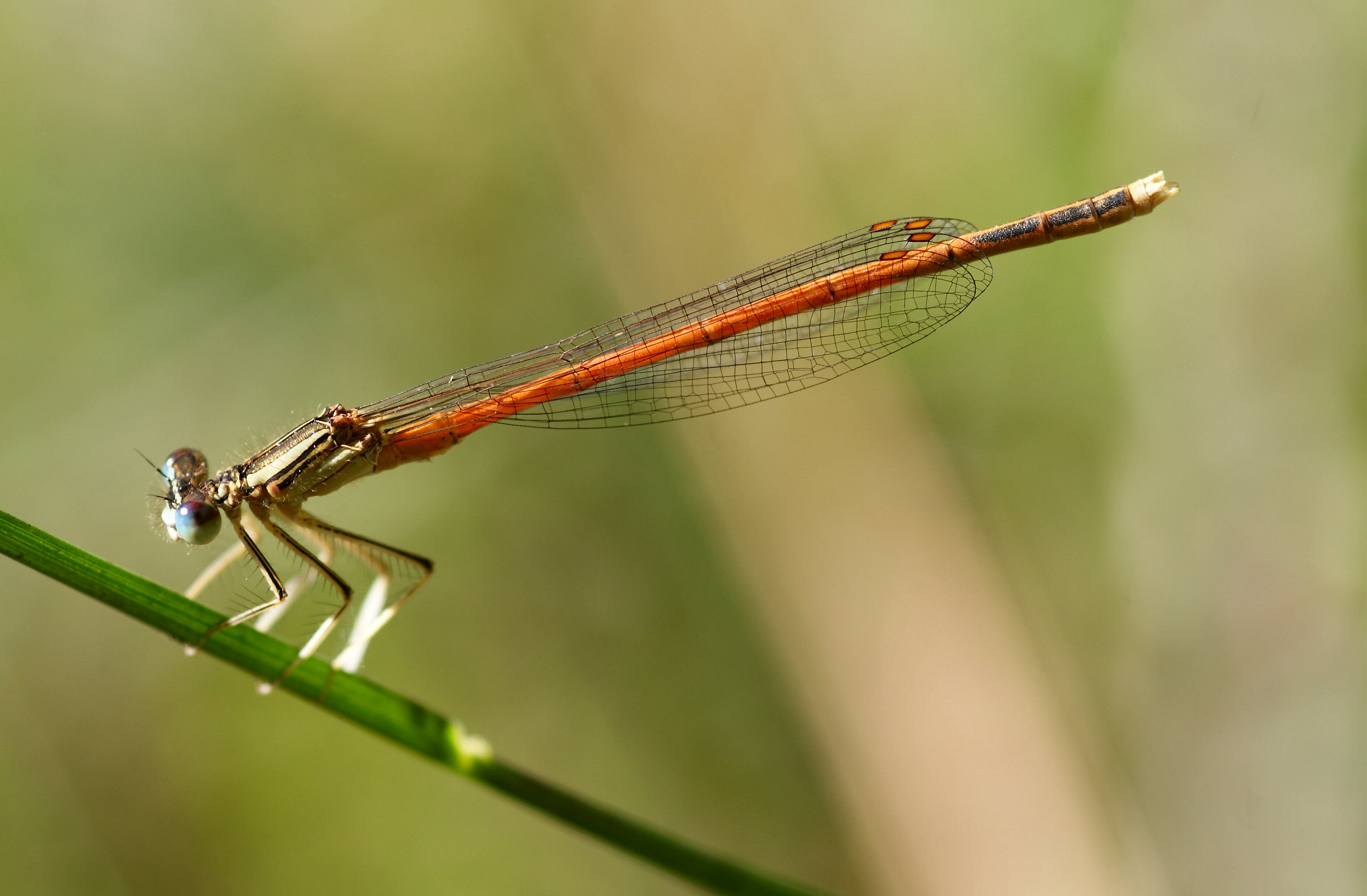

Scientific classification
- Kingdom: Animalia
- Phylum: Arthropoda
- Class: Insecta
- Order: Odonata
- Suborder: Zygoptera
- Family: Platycnemididae
- Genus: Platycnemis
- Species: P. acutipennis

Binomial name
- Platycnemis acutipennis Selys, 1841

= Platycnemis acutipennis =

Species of damselfly

Platycnemis acutipennis, known as the orange featherleg or the orange white-legged damselfly, is a species of damselfly in the family Platycnemididae.

== Description ==
Platycnemis acutipennis is the only European damselfly which combines an orange-red abdomen and blue eyes. The male has moderately wide hind tibias (wider in both P. pennipes and P. latipes; and the males of both those species have blue abdomens). The thorax is buff-coloured with black stripes. There is an orange spot near the tip of each wing. The sexes are similar.

== Behaviour ==
Platycnemis acutipennis lives in fresh water, either still or up to moderately fast-flowing.

== Distribution ==
Platycnemis acutipennis is common and widely distributed across the southwest of Europe including Portugal, Spain, and France; it is endemic to that area. There are however some recent records from Germany.
