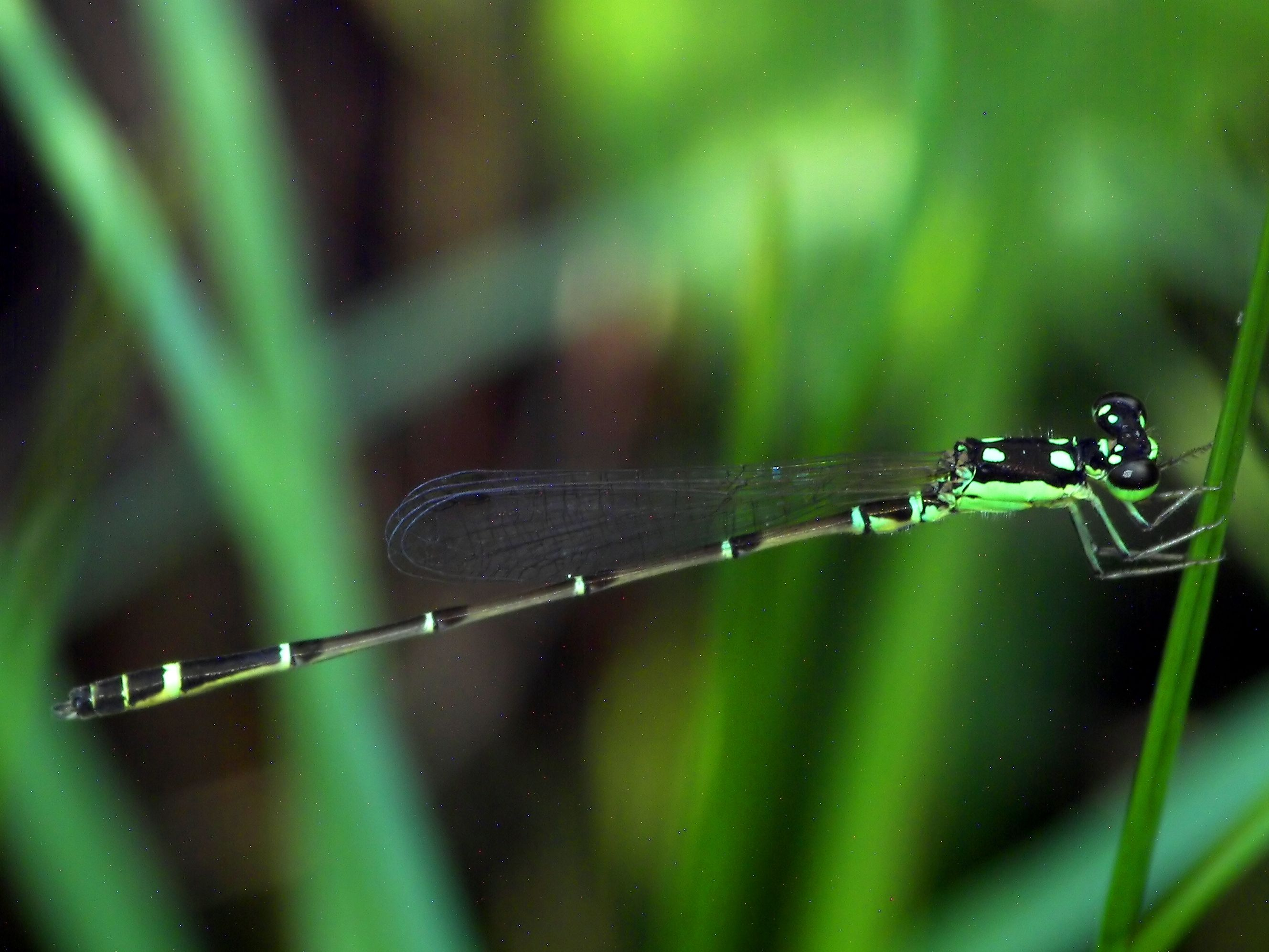
- M. hirosei

Scientific classification
- Kingdom: Animalia
- Phylum: Arthropoda
- Class: Insecta
- Order: Odonata
- Suborder: Zygoptera
- Family: Coenagrionidae
- Genus: Mortonagrion; Fraser, 1920

= Mortonagrion =

Genus of damselflies

Mortonagrion is a genus of damselfly in the family Coenagrionidae. It contains the following species:

- Mortonagrion aborense (Laidlaw, 1914)
- Mortonagrion amoenum (Ris, 1915)
- Mortonagrion appendiculatum Lieftinck, 1937
- Mortonagrion arthuri Fraser, 1942
- Mortonagrion ceylonicum Lieftinck, 1971 - Sri Lanka Midget
- Mortonagrion falcatum Lieftinck, 1934
- Mortonagrion forficulatum Lieftinck, 1953
- Mortonagrion hirosei Asahina, 1972 - Four-spot Midget
- Mortonagrion martini Ris, 1900
- Mortonagrion selenion (Ris, 1916)
- Mortonagrion stygium (Fraser, 1954)
- Mortonagrion varralli Fraser, 1920
