= Mortonagrion ceylonicum =

Conservation status
- Endangered (IUCN 3.1)

Scientific classification
- Kingdom: Animalia
- Phylum: Arthropoda
- Clade: Pancrustacea
- Class: Insecta
- Order: Odonata
- Suborder: Zygoptera
- Family: Coenagrionidae
- Genus: Mortonagrion
- Species: M. ceylonicum

Binomial name
- Mortonagrion ceylonicum Lieftinck, 1971

Species of damselfly

Mortonagrion ceylonicum, the Sri Lanka midget, is a species of damselfly in the family Coenagrionidae. it is endemic to Sri Lanka.

== See also ==
- List of odonates of Sri Lanka
