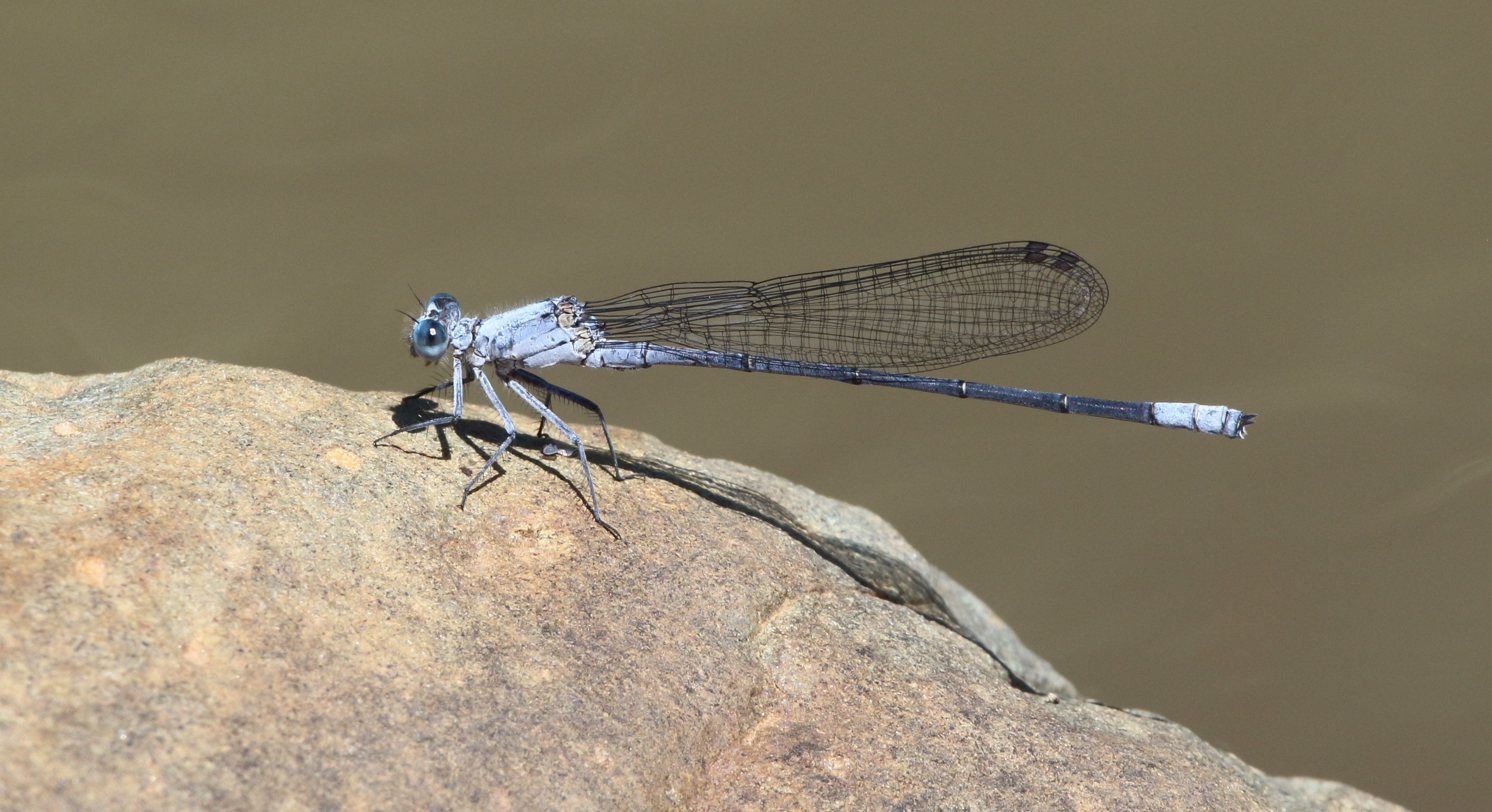
- Mesocnemis singularis

Scientific classification
- Kingdom: Animalia
- Phylum: Arthropoda
- Clade: Pancrustacea
- Class: Insecta
- Order: Odonata
- Suborder: Zygoptera
- Family: Platycnemididae
- Subfamily: Allocnemidinae
- Genus: Mesocnemis; Karsch, 1891

= Mesocnemis =

Genus of damselflies

Mesocnemis is a genus of African damselflies in the white-legged damselfly family (Platycnemididae). They are commonly known as Riverjacks.

The genus contains the following species:

- Mesocnemis dupuyi Legrand, 1982 - Gambia Riverjack
- Mesocnemis robusta (Selys, 1886)
- Mesocnemis saralisa Dijkstra, 2008
- Mesocnemis singularis Karsch, 1891 - Common Riverjack, Savanna Brook-damsel, Savanna Stream-damsel
- Mesocnemis tisi Lempert, 1992 - Liberian Riverjack
