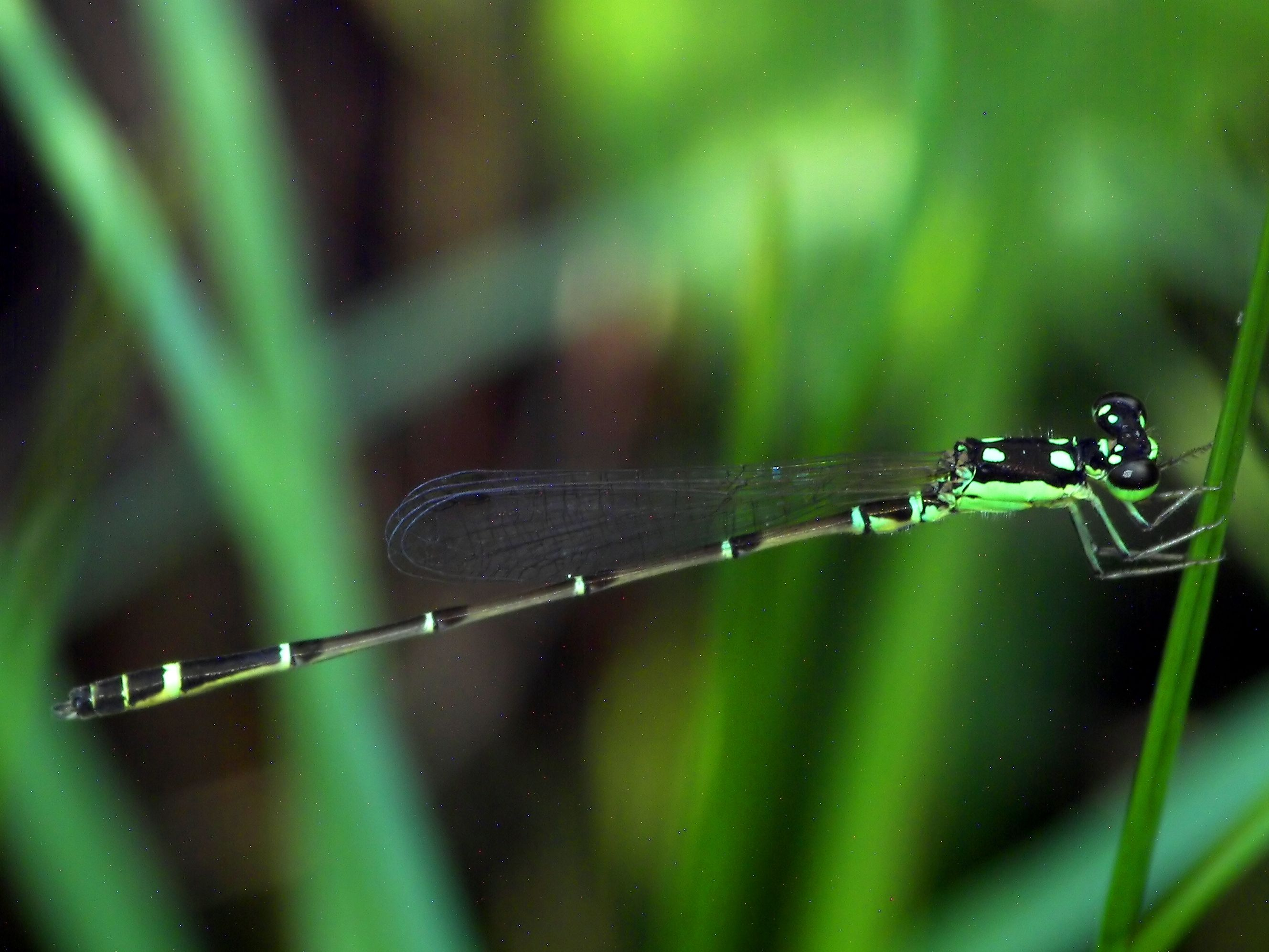

Conservation status
- Near Threatened (IUCN 3.1)

Scientific classification
- Kingdom: Animalia
- Phylum: Arthropoda
- Class: Insecta
- Order: Odonata
- Suborder: Zygoptera
- Family: Coenagrionidae
- Genus: Mortonagrion
- Species: M. hirosei

Binomial name
- Mortonagrion hirosei Asahina, 1972

= Mortonagrion hirosei =

Species of damselfly

Mortonagrion hirosei, the four-spot midget, is a species of damselfly in family Coenagrionidae. It is found in Hong Kong and Japan and northern Taiwan. Its natural habitats are rivers and saline marshes. It is threatened by habitat loss.

== Image ==
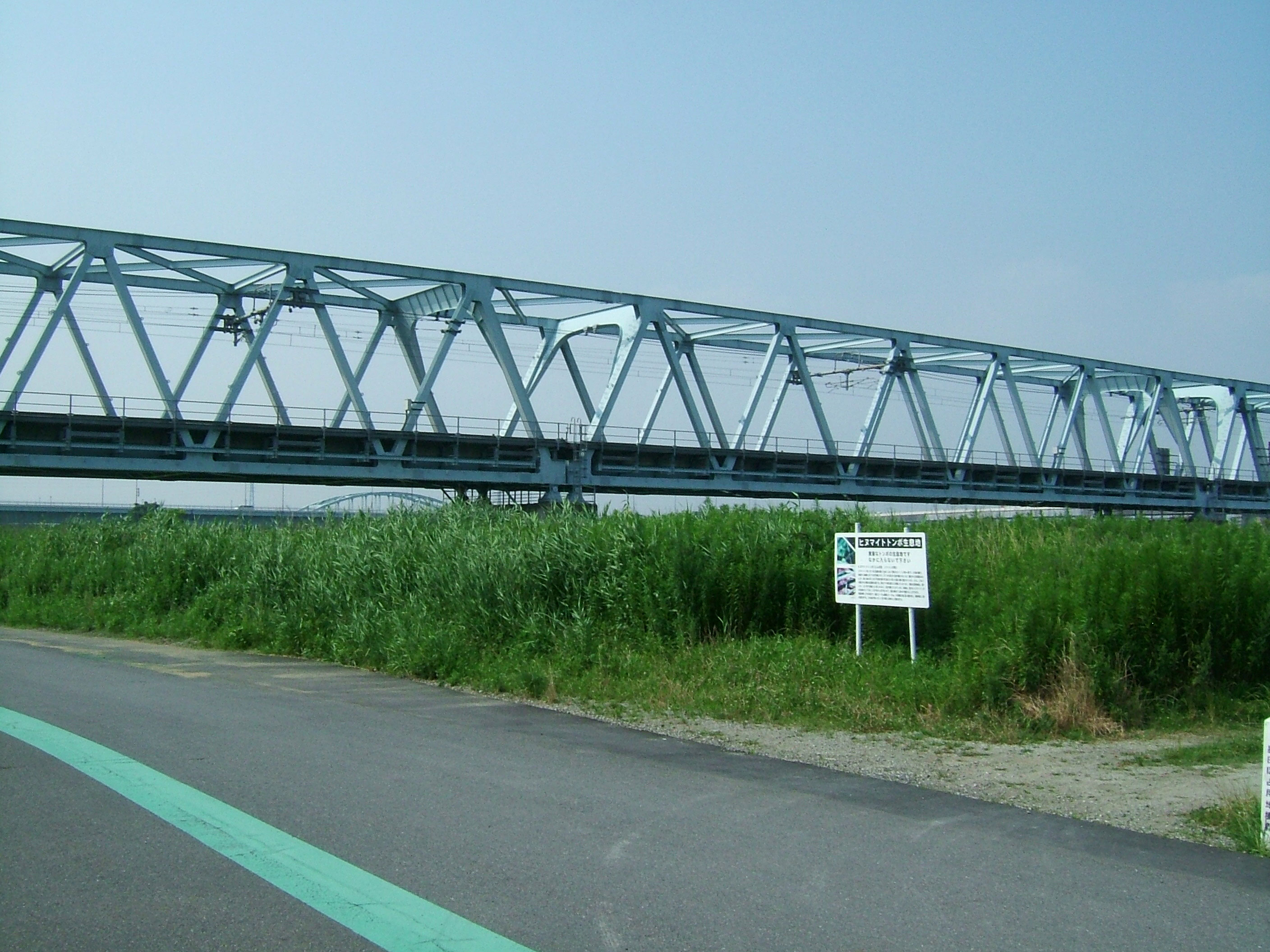
The habitat area of Mortonagrion hirosei on Sumida ward, Tokyo, Japan

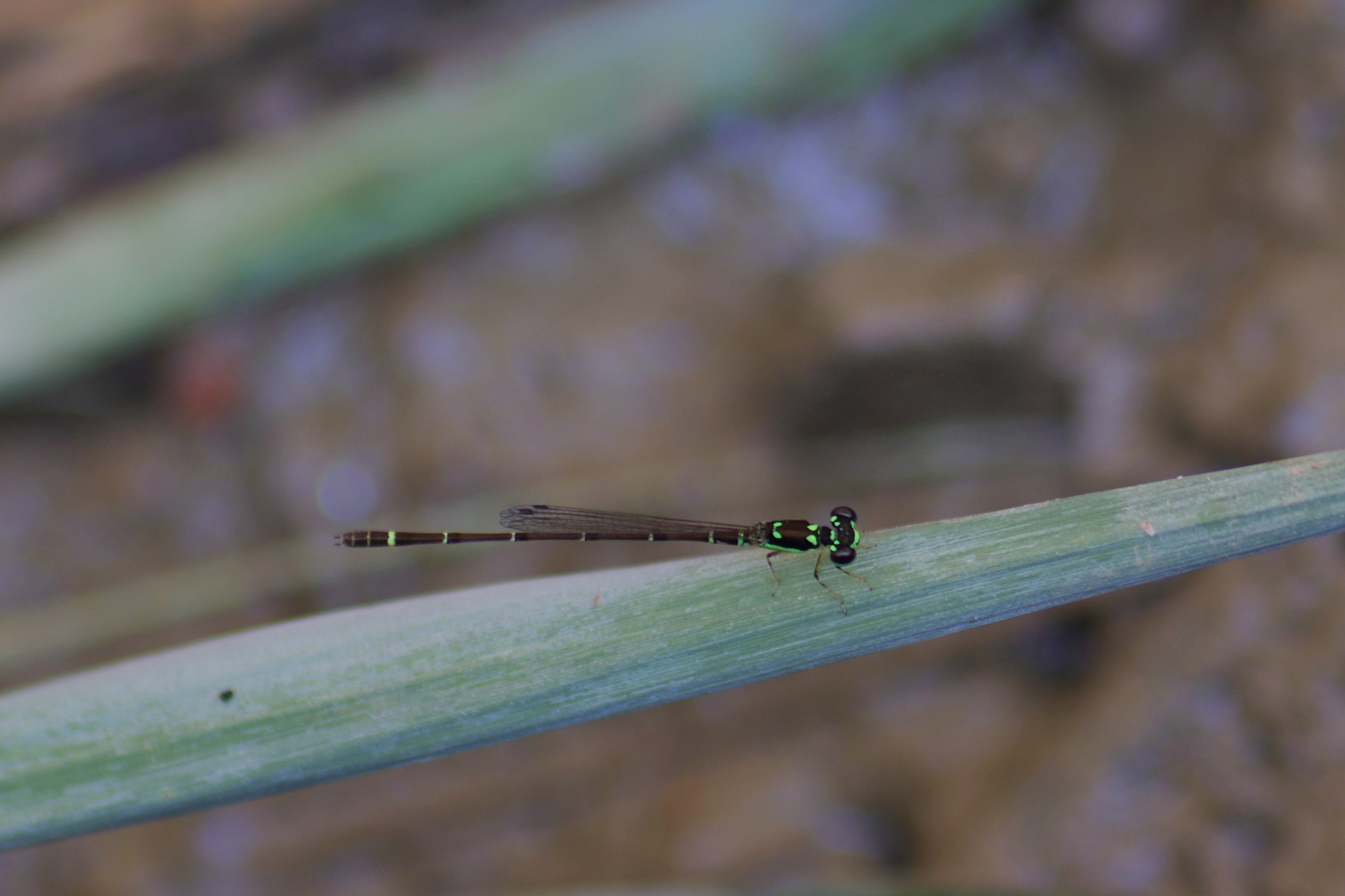
Taiwan Taipei (male)

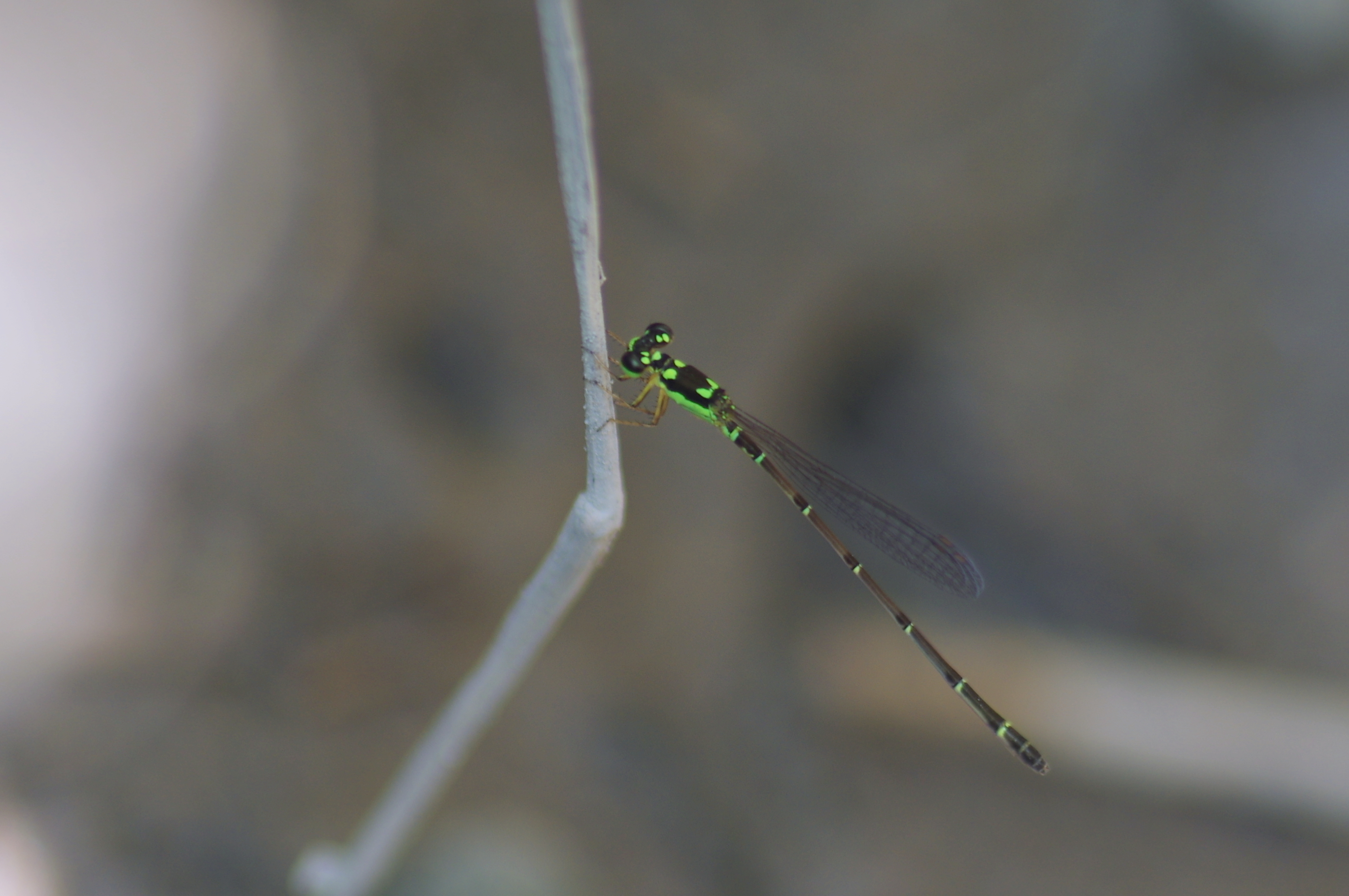
Taiwan Taipei (male)

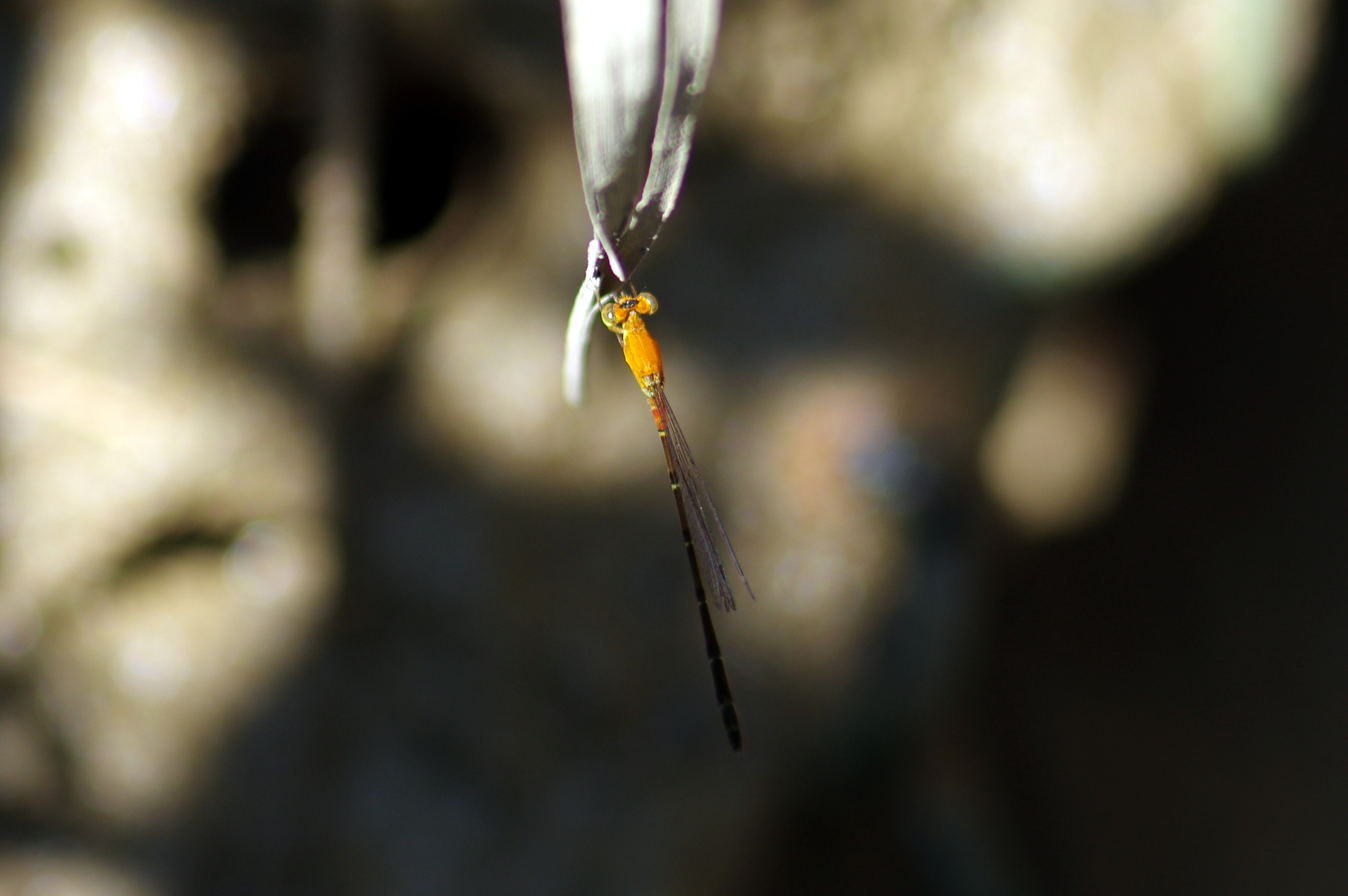
Taiwan Taipei (female)

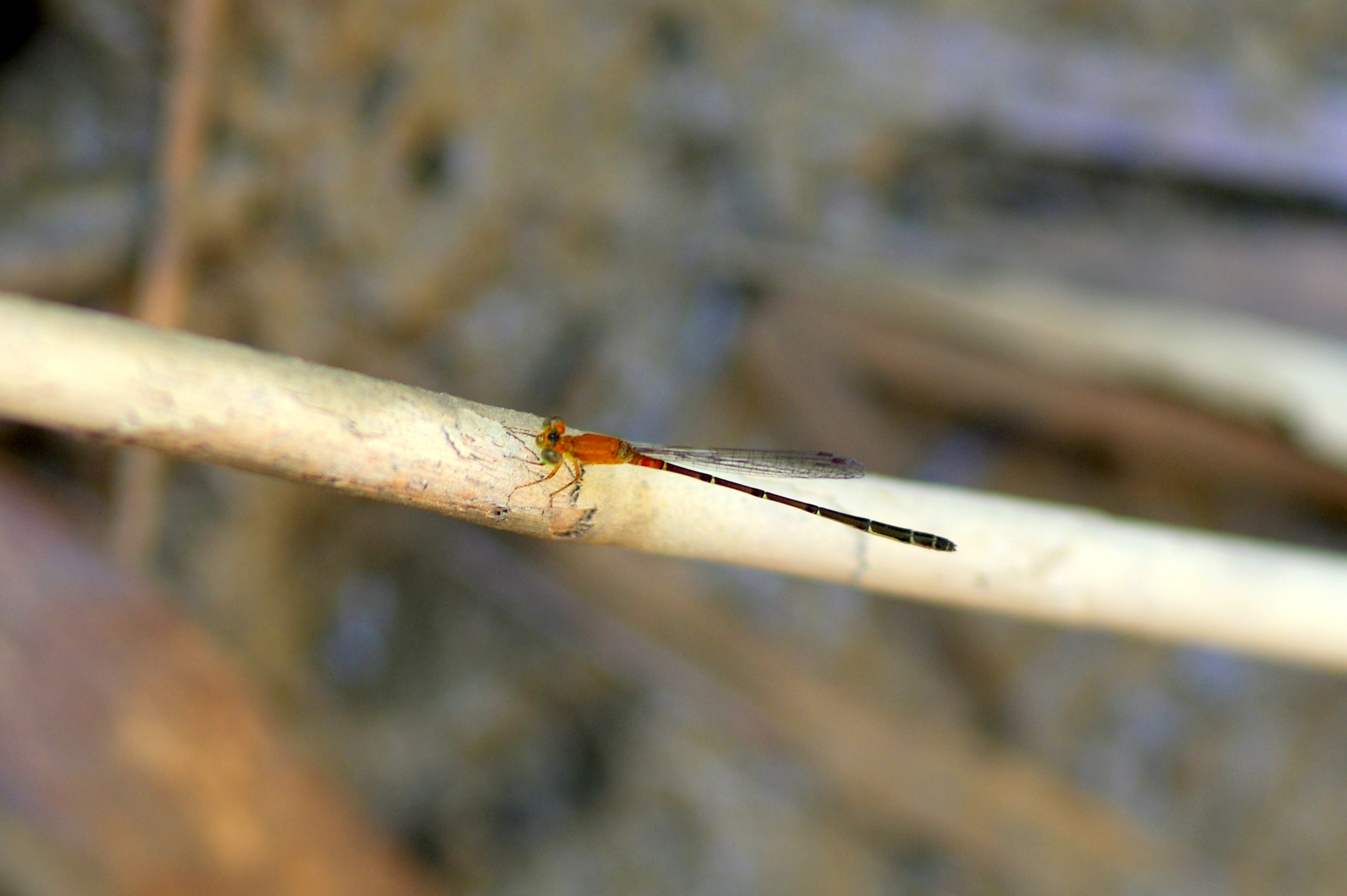
Taiwan Taipei (female)
