= Platycnemis phasmovolans =

Scientific classification
- Kingdom: Animalia
- Phylum: Arthropoda
- Clade: Pancrustacea
- Class: Insecta
- Order: Odonata
- Suborder: Zygoptera
- Family: Platycnemididae
- Genus: Platycnemis
- Species: P. phasmovolans

Binomial name
- Platycnemis phasmovolans Hämäläinen, 2003

Species of damselfly

Platycnemis phasmovolans is a species of damselfly found in Southeast Asia in the forests of Laos and southern China with extremely large and flattened tibiae on the middle and hind legs of adult males. The legs are bright white and are thought to reflect light in the dark shade of forests and used in courtship displays. The extent of tibial dilation is more than in a few other platycnemids such as Proplatycnemis alatipes of Madagascar and a few other palearctic species like Platycnemis foliacea and Platycnemis phyllopoda. Similar flattened tibia have been found in the fossil damselfly Yijenplatycnemis huangi.
