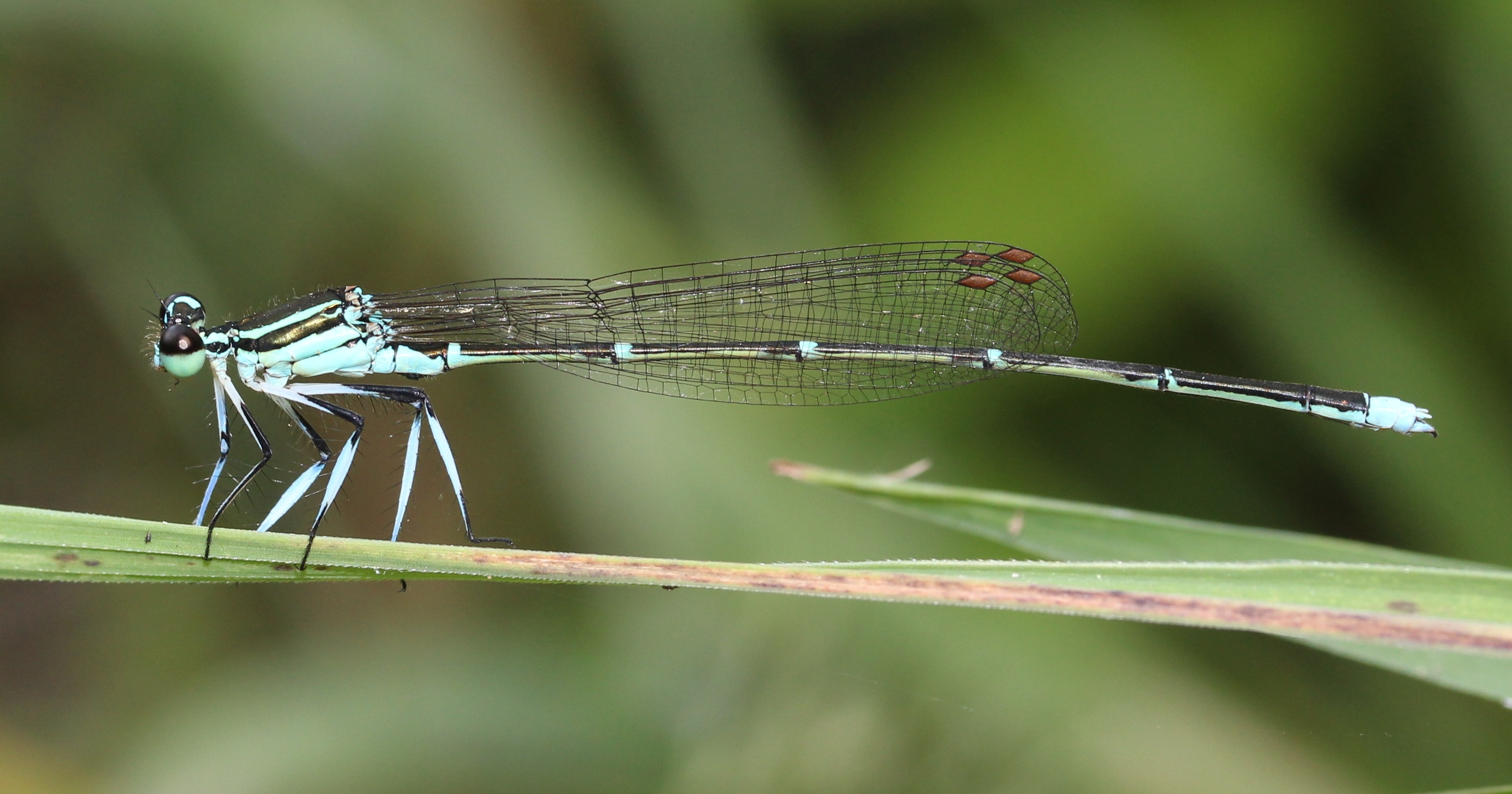

Scientific classification
- Domain: Eukaryota
- Kingdom: Animalia
- Phylum: Arthropoda
- Class: Insecta
- Order: Odonata
- Suborder: Zygoptera
- Family: Platycnemididae
- Genus: Copera
- Species: C. annulata

Binomial name
- Copera annulata Selys, 1863

= Copera annulata =

Species of damselfly

Copera annulata is a species of white-legged damselfly in the family Platycnemididae.
