= Copera nyansana =

Conservation status
- Least Concern (IUCN 3.1)

Scientific classification
- Kingdom: Animalia
- Phylum: Arthropoda
- Clade: Pancrustacea
- Class: Insecta
- Order: Odonata
- Suborder: Zygoptera
- Family: Platycnemididae
- Genus: Copera
- Species: C. nyansana

Binomial name
- Copera nyansana (Förster, 1916)

Synonyms
- Platycnemis flavipes Navás, 1924; Platycnemis nyansana Förster, 1916; Platycnemis xanthopus Navás, 1924

Species of damselfly

Copera nyansana is a species of damselfly in the family Platycnemididae. It is found in the Democratic Republic of the Congo and Uganda. Its natural habitats are subtropical or tropical moist lowland forests and freshwater marshes.
