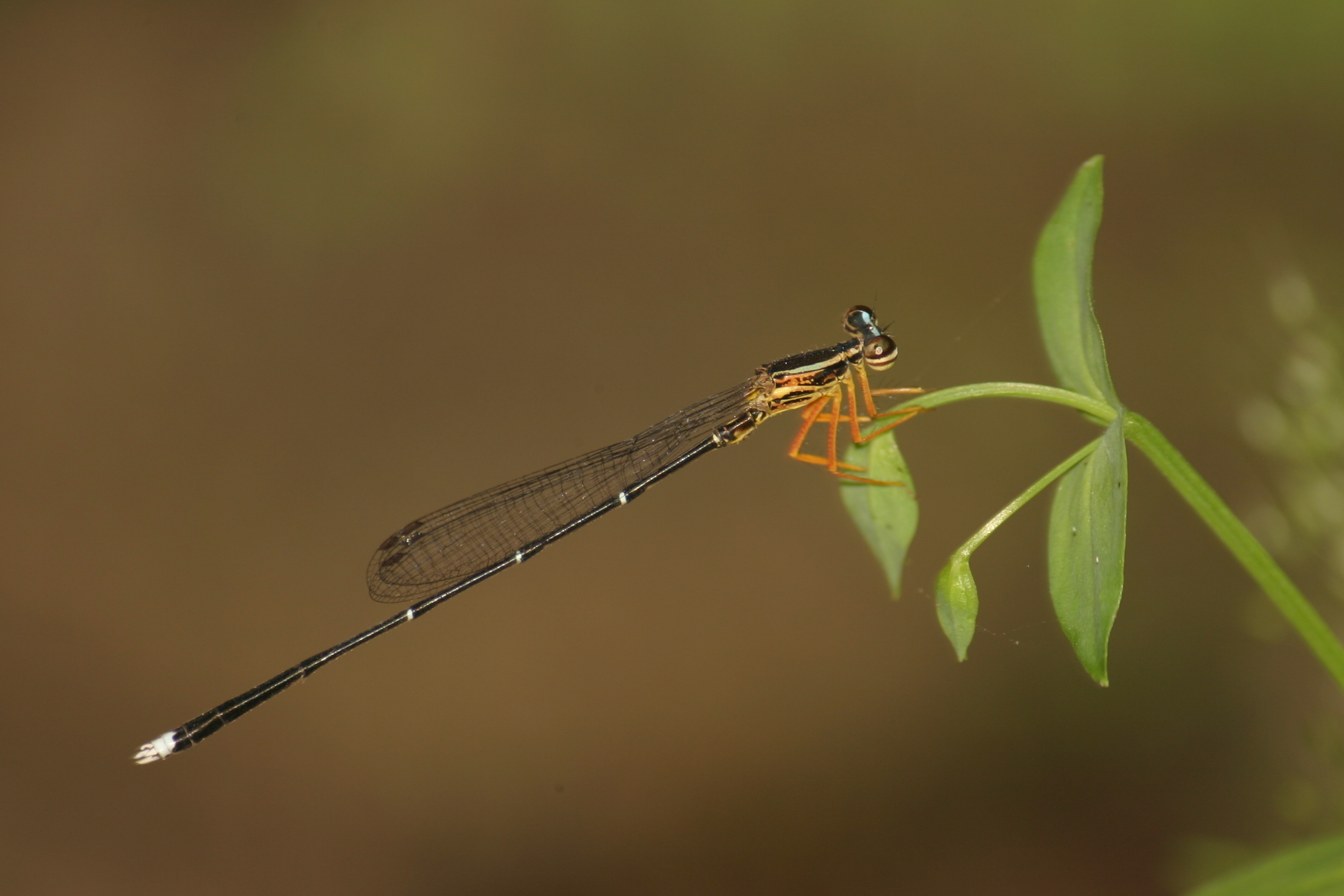
- Male
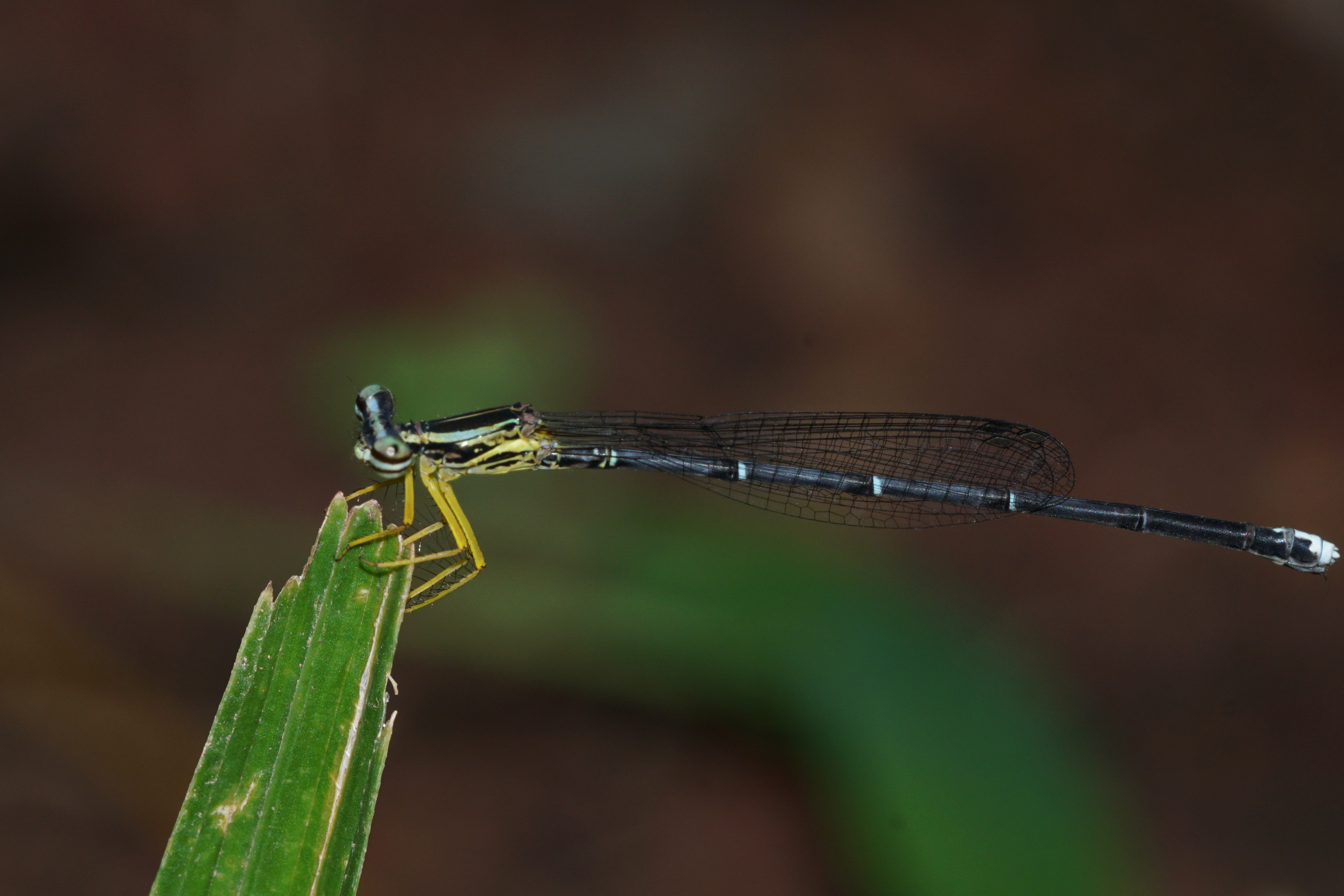
- Female

Conservation status
- Least Concern (IUCN 3.1)

Scientific classification
- Kingdom: Animalia
- Phylum: Arthropoda
- Class: Insecta
- Order: Odonata
- Suborder: Zygoptera
- Family: Platycnemididae
- Genus: Copera
- Species: C. vittata

Binomial name
- Copera vittata (Selys, 1863)

Synonyms
- Psilocnemis vittata Selys, 1863; Psilocnemis serapica Hagen in Selys, 1863; Psilocnemis atomaria Selys, 1886; Psilocnemis acutimargo Krüger, 1898

= Copera vittata =

Species of damselfly

Copera vittata is a species of damselfly in the family Platycnemididae. It is native to Asia, where it is widely distributed from India to Indonesia. It is known commonly as the blue bush dart. There are several subspecies and it may represent a species complex.

== Description and habitat ==
It is a medium-sized damselfly with brown-capped yellow eyes with a narrow equatorial black band encircling them. Its thorax is black on dorsum with a narrow bluish-yellow humeral stripe, split in two and overlap each other. This stripe is followed by a broad black fascia, on the middle of the lateral side of the thorax, peppered with small pale yellow spots. The lateral sides beyond this is yellow, marked with an irregular black stripe on the anterior border of postero-lateral suture, and another one on the middle portion of metepimeron. Abdomen is black on dorsal half up to segment 8; paler on ventral half and with bluish-white basal annules. Segment 9 is black on basal half and bluish-white on apical half. Segment 10 is bluish-white.

Anal appendages are pale blue or creamy white. The superiors are as long as segment 10, conical, and tapered at apices. The inferiors nearly twice the length of superiors. The inferiors are pale within, blackish-brown externally. In the related species, Copera marginipes, the superiors are half the length of segment 10 and inferiors are at least four times the length of superiors. The inferiors tipped with black beneath.

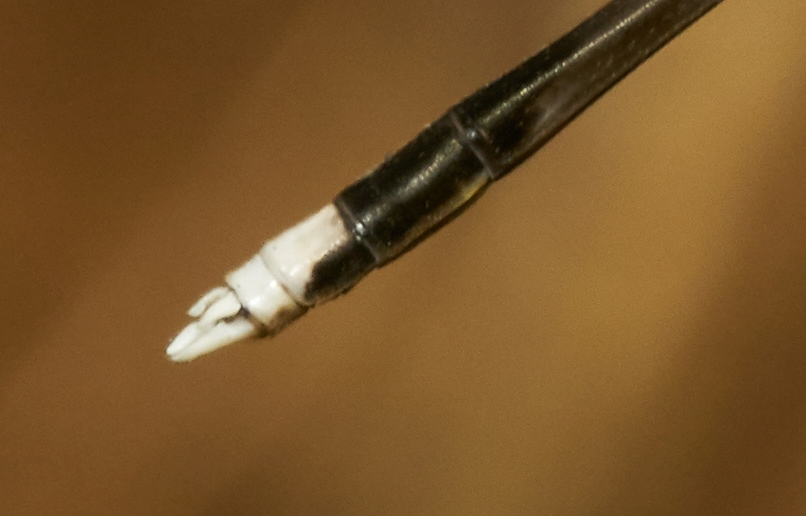
Male anal appendages (Copera vittata)

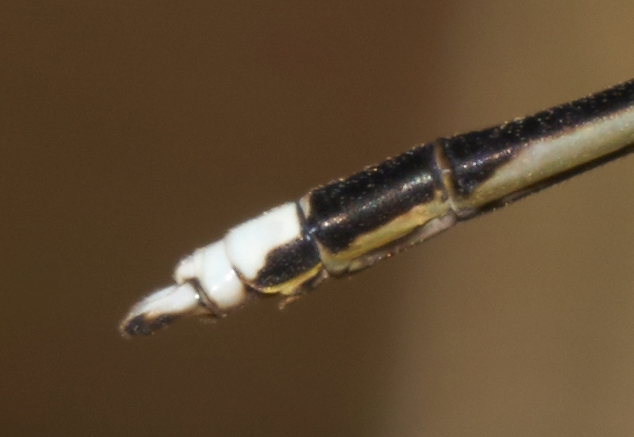
Male anal appendages (Copera marginipes)

The female is more robust compared to the male, dull in colors and marks less conspicuously defined. Tenerals of both sex can be whole white with few black markings.

Commonly found in among undergrowth along the banks of rivers and streams, often in the hills.

== See also ==
- List of odonates of India
- List of odonata of Kerala
