= Mesocnemis tisi =

Conservation status
- Endangered (IUCN 3.1)

Scientific classification
- Kingdom: Animalia
- Phylum: Arthropoda
- Class: Insecta
- Order: Odonata
- Suborder: Zygoptera
- Family: Platycnemididae
- Genus: Mesocnemis
- Species: M. tisi

Binomial name
- Mesocnemis tisi Lempert, 1992

Species of damselfly

Mesocnemis tisi is a species of white-legged damselfly in the family Platycnemididae.

The IUCN conservation status of Mesocnemis tisi is "EN", endangered. The species faces a high risk of extinction in the near future. The IUCN status was reviewed in 2010.
