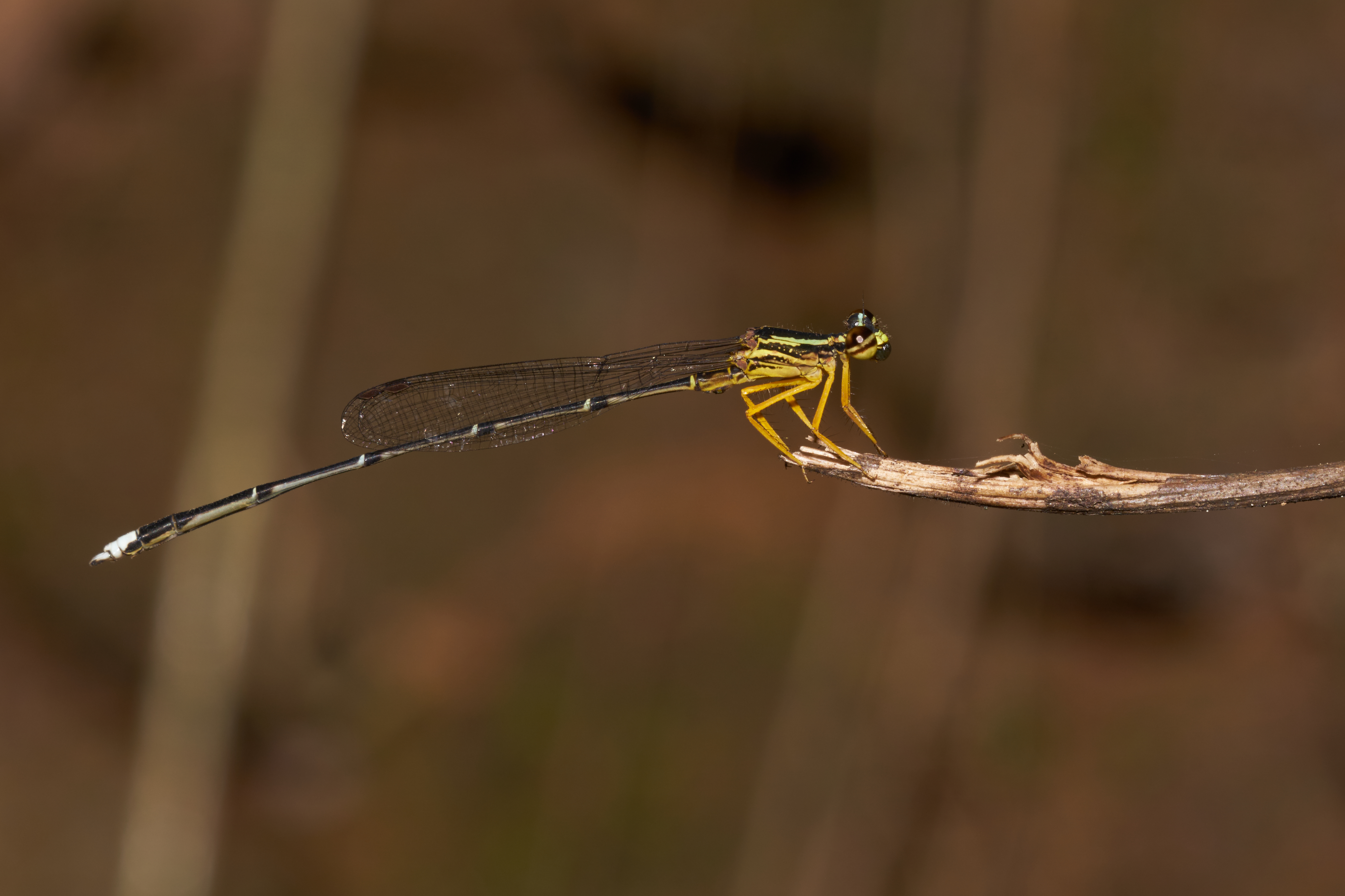

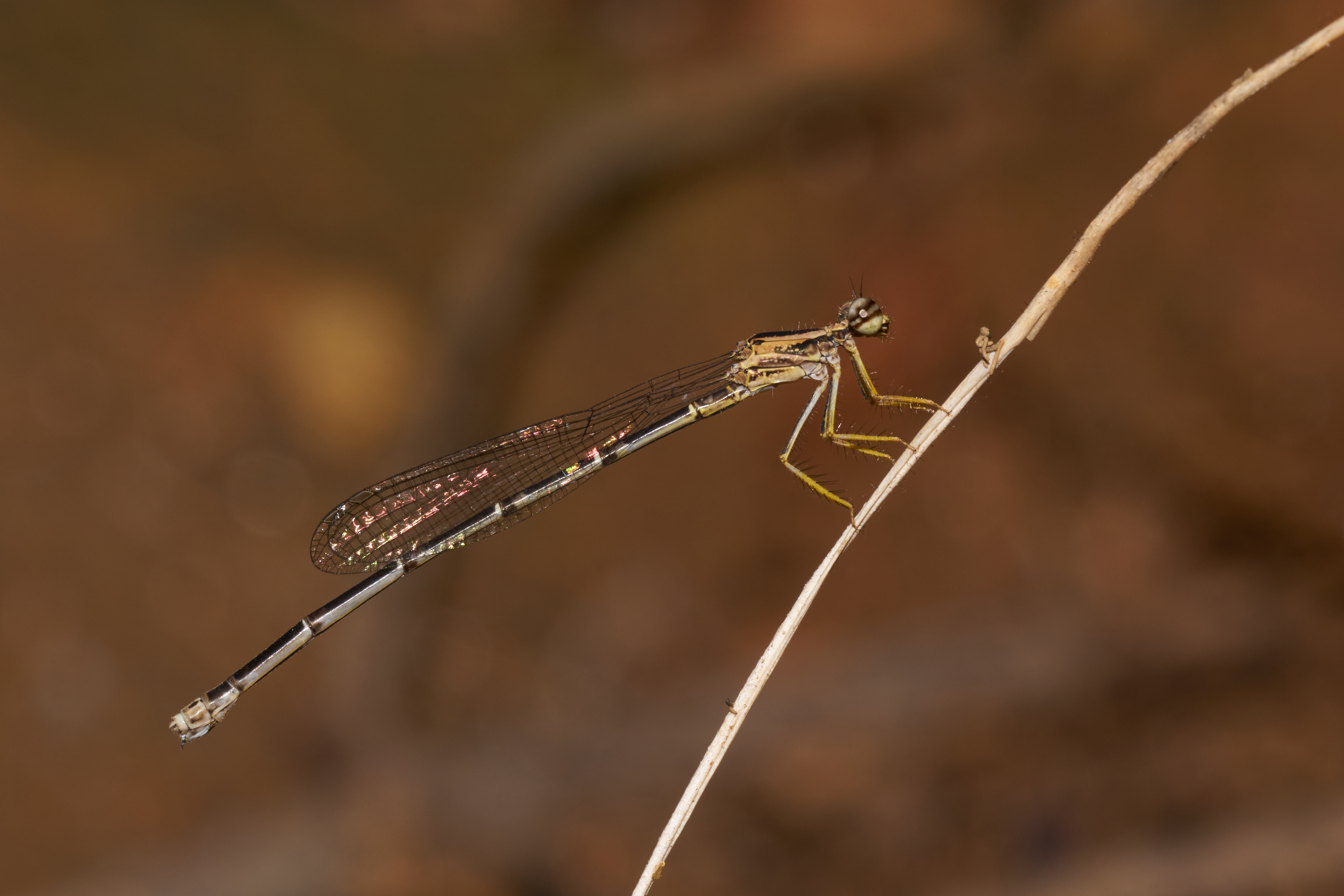
- Male (top) and female (bottom)

Conservation status
- Least Concern (IUCN 3.1)

Scientific classification
- Kingdom: Animalia
- Phylum: Arthropoda
- Class: Insecta
- Order: Odonata
- Suborder: Zygoptera
- Family: Platycnemididae
- Genus: Copera
- Species: C. marginipes

Binomial name
- Copera marginipes (Rambur, 1842)

Synonyms
- Copera acutimargo Krug, 1898; Platycnemis lacteola Selys, 1863; Platycnemis marginipes Rambur, 1842; Platycnemis pierrati Navás, 1935

= Copera marginipes =

Species of damselfly

Copera marginipes, commonly known as the yellow bush dart, is a species of damselfly in the family Platycnemididae. It is native to Asia, where it is widespread and common.

== Description and habitat ==
It is a medium sized damselfly with brown-capped yellow eyes with a narrow equatorial black band encircling them. Its thorax is black on dorsum with a yellow mid-dorsal carina and a narrow greenish-yellow humeral stripe, split in two and overlap each other. This stripe is followed by a broad black fascia, on the middle of the lateral side of the thorax, peppered with small pale yellow spots. The lateral sides beyond this is yellow, marked with an irregular black stripe on the anterior border of postero-lateral suture, and another one on the middle portion of metepimeron. Abdomen is black on dorsal half up to segment 8; paler on ventral half and with bluish-white basal annules. Segment 9 is bluish-white on dorsal half and black below it. Segment 10 is bluish-white.

Anal appendages are pale yellow to white, the inferiors tipped with black. The superiors are half the length of segment 10 and inferiors are at least four times the length of superiors. In the related species, Copera vittata, the superiors are as long as segment 10 and the inferiors nearly twice the length of superiors. The inferiors are pale within, blackish-brown externally.

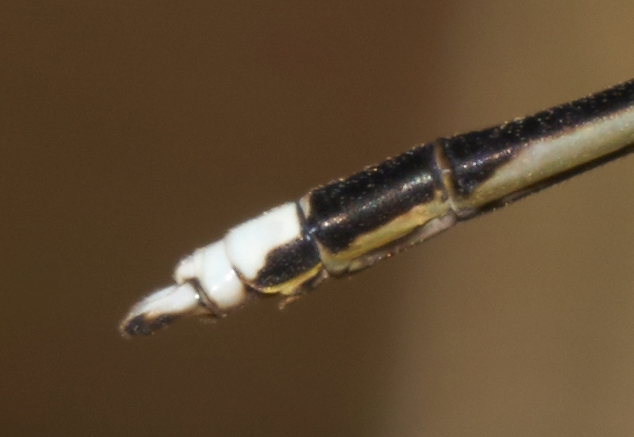
Male anal appendages (Copera marginipes)

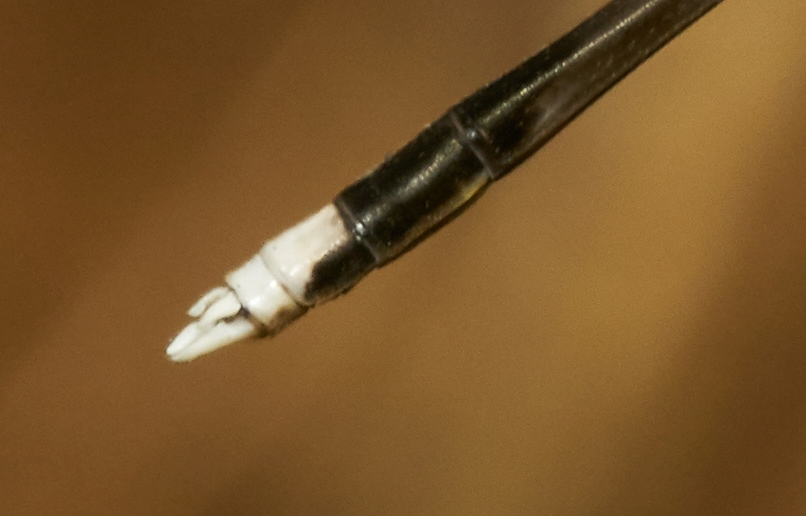
Male anal appendages (Copera vittata)

The female is more robust compared to the male, dull in colors and marks less conspicuously defined. Tenerals of both sex can be whole white with few black markings.

Commonly found in among undergrowth along the banks of rivers and streams, often at lowland.

== See also ==
- List of odonates of India
- List of odonata of Kerala
