= Copera chantaburii =

Conservation status
- Least Concern (IUCN 3.1)

Scientific classification
- Kingdom: Animalia
- Phylum: Arthropoda
- Class: Insecta
- Order: Odonata
- Suborder: Zygoptera
- Family: Platycnemididae
- Genus: Copera
- Species: C. chantaburii

Binomial name
- Copera chantaburii Asahina, 1984

Species of damselfly

Copera chantaburii is a species of white-legged damselfly in the family Platycnemididae.

The IUCN conservation status of Copera chantaburii is "LC", least concern, with no immediate threat to the species' survival. The IUCN status was reviewed in 2011.
