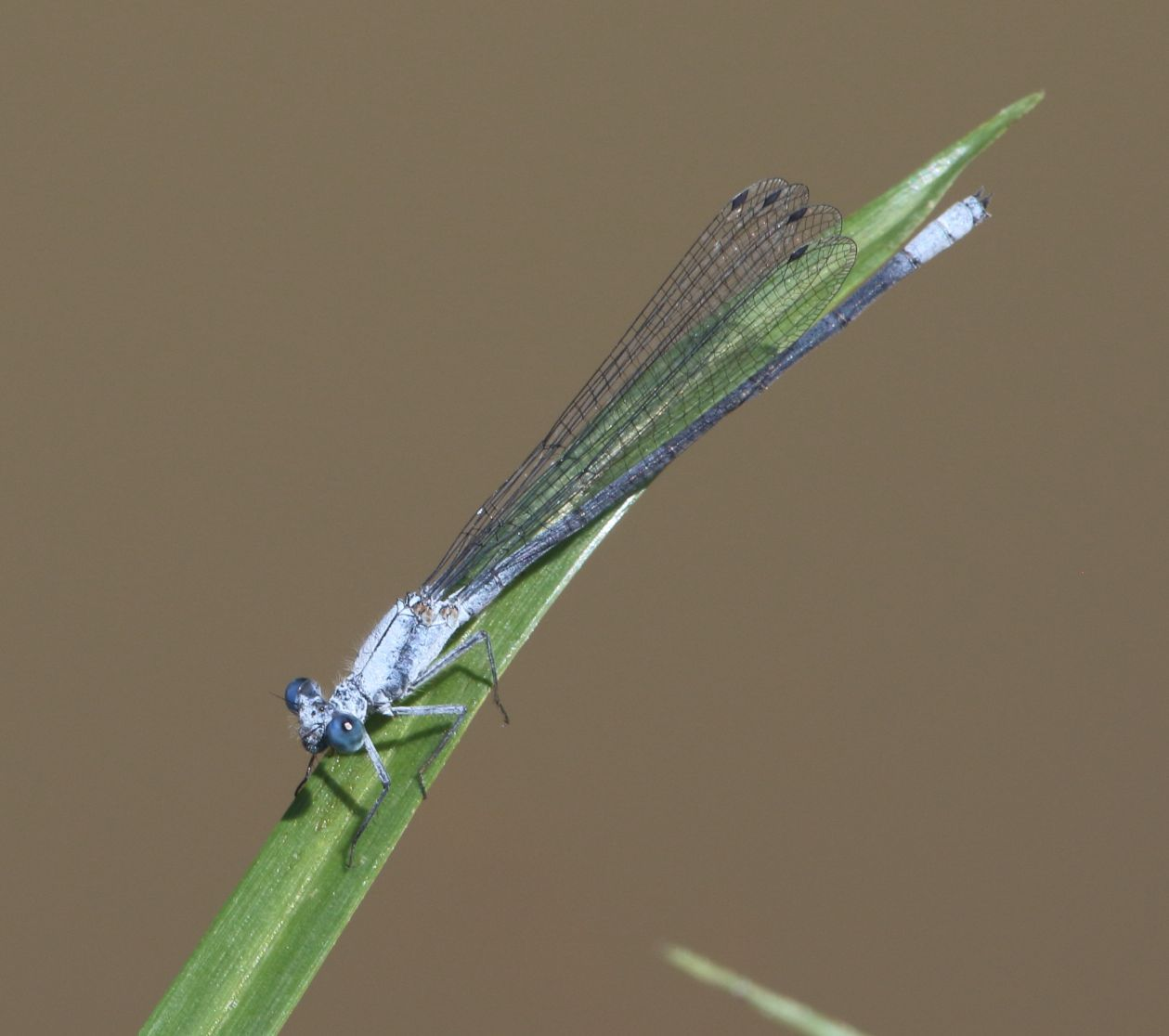
- Male

Conservation status
- Least Concern (IUCN 3.1)

Scientific classification
- Kingdom: Animalia
- Phylum: Arthropoda
- Class: Insecta
- Order: Odonata
- Suborder: Zygoptera
- Family: Platycnemididae
- Genus: Mesocnemis
- Species: M. singularis

Binomial name
- Mesocnemis singularis Karsch, 1891

= Mesocnemis singularis =

Species of damselfly

Mesocnemis singularis is a species of damselfly in the family Platycnemididae. Common names include riverjack, savanna riverjack, common riverjack, savanna brook-damsel, and savanna stream-damsel.

== Distribution ==
This species is widespread in sub-Saharan Africa; it has been found in Angola, Botswana, Cameroon, the Democratic Republic of the Congo, Ivory Coast, Gabon, Ghana, Guinea, Kenya, Liberia, Malawi, Mozambique, Namibia, Nigeria, Sierra Leone, South Africa, Sudan, Tanzania, Togo, Uganda, Zambia, and Zimbabwe.

== Habitat ==
Its natural habitats include open, rocky rivers and streams in savanna, bush or forest; also rocky shores of lakes.

== Identification ==
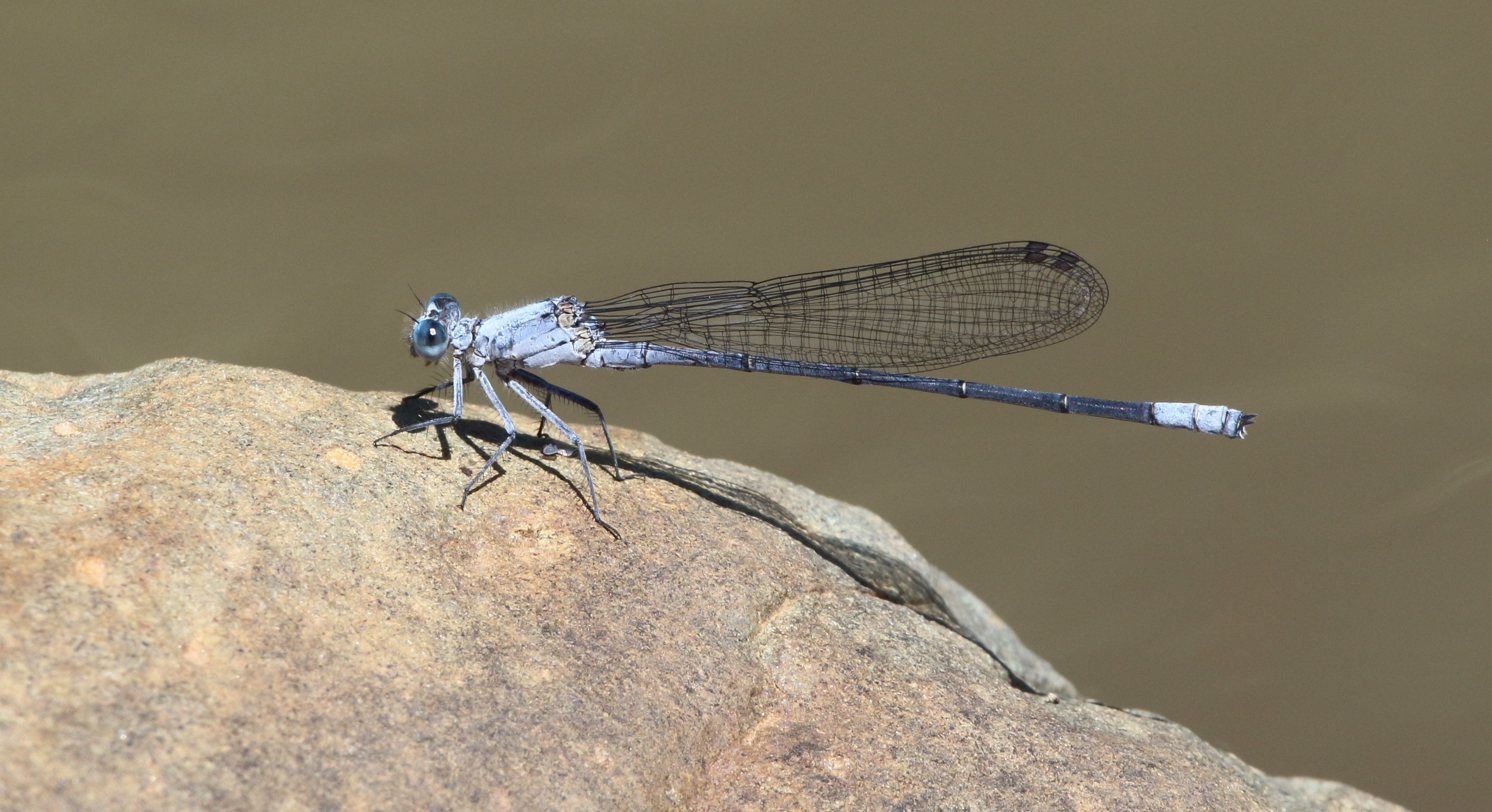
Male

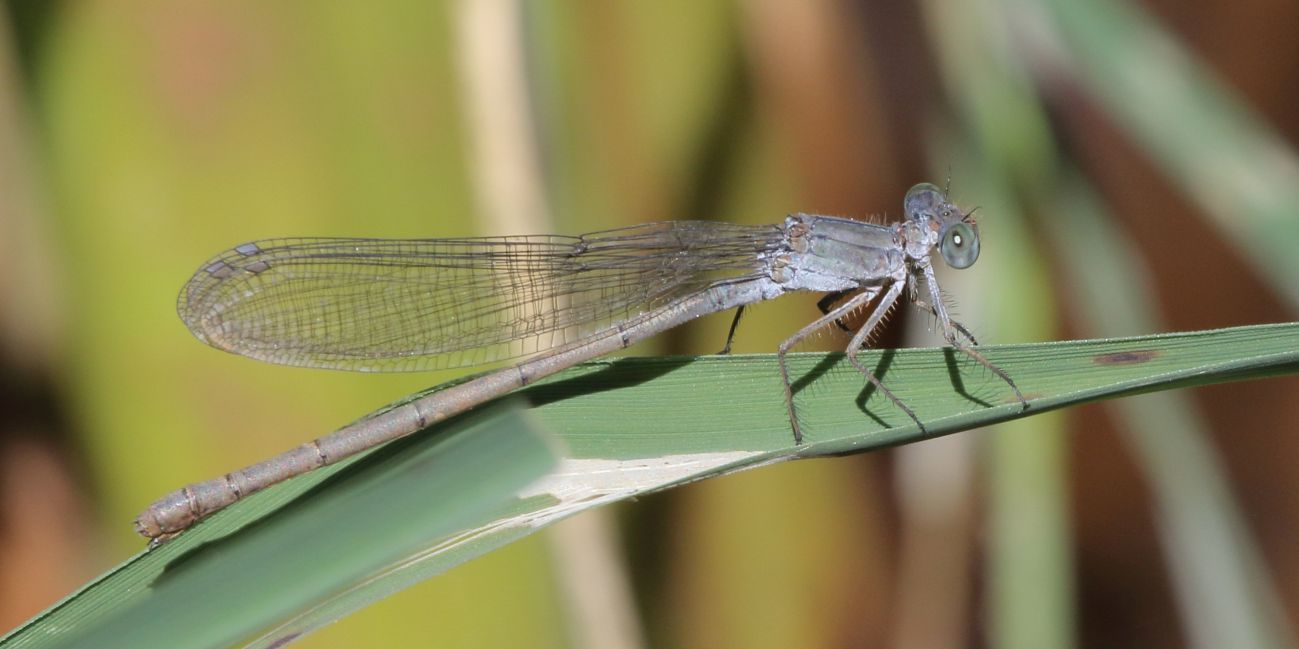
Female
