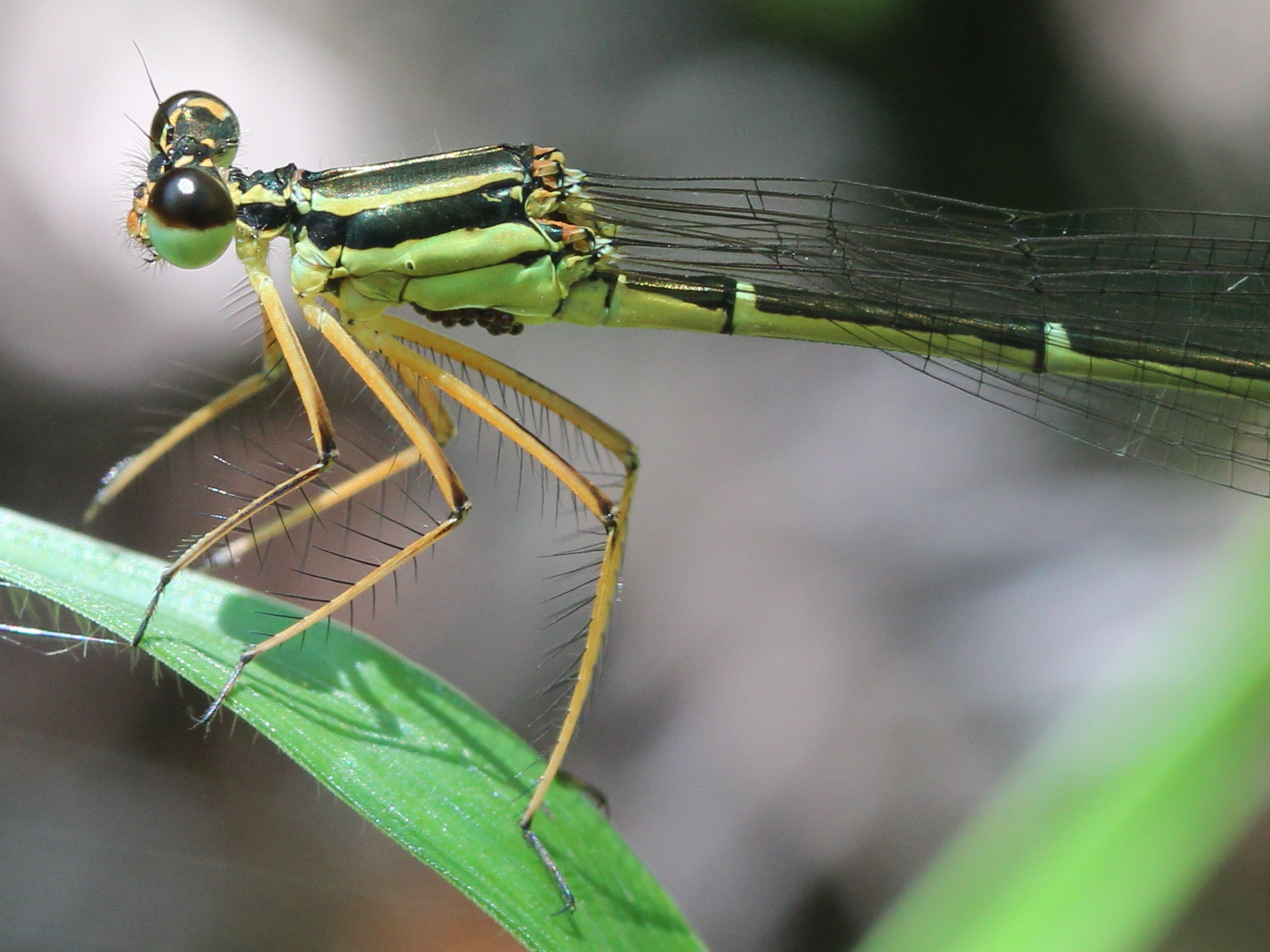
- Copera annulata (female)

Scientific classification
- Kingdom: Animalia
- Phylum: Arthropoda
- Clade: Pancrustacea
- Class: Insecta
- Order: Odonata
- Suborder: Zygoptera
- Family: Platycnemididae
- Genus: Copera; Kirby, 1890

= Copera =

Genus of damselflies

Copera is a genus of damselflies in the family Platycnemididae. They are distributed in Asia, especially Southeast Asia.

== Species ==
The following species are currently placed in Copera:

- Copera chantaburii Asahina, 1984
- Copera congolensis (Martin, 1912)
- Copera guttifera (Fraser, 1950)
- Copera imbricata (Hagen in Selys, 1863)
- Copera marginipes (Rambur, 1842) – yellow bush dart
- Copera nyansana (Förster, 1916)
- Copera rufipes (Selys, 1886)
- Copera sikassoensis (Martin, 1912)
- Copera vittata (Selys, 1863) – blue bush dart

Genetic analysis suggests that some members are better treated as species of other genera.

- Copera annulata
- Copera atomaria
- Copera ciliata
- Copera rubripes
- Copera superplatypes
- Copera tokyoensis
