= Mesocnemis dupuyi =

Conservation status
- Near Threatened (IUCN 3.1)

Scientific classification
- Kingdom: Animalia
- Phylum: Arthropoda
- Class: Insecta
- Order: Odonata
- Suborder: Zygoptera
- Family: Platycnemididae
- Genus: Mesocnemis
- Species: M. dupuyi

Binomial name
- Mesocnemis dupuyi Legrand, 1982

Species of damselfly

Mesocnemis dupuyi is a species of white-legged damselfly in the family Platycnemididae.

The IUCN conservation status of Mesocnemis dupuyi is "NT", near threatened. The species may be considered threatened in the near future. The IUCN status was reviewed in 2010.
