= Copera sikassoensis =

Conservation status
- Least Concern (IUCN 3.1)

Scientific classification
- Kingdom: Animalia
- Phylum: Arthropoda
- Clade: Pancrustacea
- Class: Insecta
- Order: Odonata
- Suborder: Zygoptera
- Family: Platycnemididae
- Genus: Copera
- Species: C. sikassoensis

Binomial name
- Copera sikassoensis (Martin, 1912)

Synonyms
- Copera subaequistyla Fraser, 1928; Platycnemis sikassoensis Martin, 1912

Species of damselfly

Copera sikassoensis is a species of damselfly in the family Platycnemididae. It is found in Benin, Central African Republic, Ivory Coast, Gambia, Ghana, Guinea, Liberia, Mali, Nigeria, Senegal, Sierra Leone, Togo, and Uganda. Its natural habitats are subtropical or tropical moist lowland forests and rivers.
