= Mesocnemis robusta =

Conservation status
- Least Concern (IUCN 3.1)

Scientific classification
- Kingdom: Animalia
- Phylum: Arthropoda
- Class: Insecta
- Order: Odonata
- Suborder: Zygoptera
- Family: Platycnemididae
- Genus: Mesocnemis
- Species: M. robusta

Binomial name
- Mesocnemis robusta (Selys, 1886)

Species of damselfly

Mesocnemis robusta is a species of white-legged damselfly in the family Platycnemididae.

The IUCN conservation status of Mesocnemis robusta is "LC", least concern, with no immediate threat to the species' survival. The IUCN status was reviewed in 2010.
