= Copera superplatypes =

Scientific classification
- Domain: Eukaryota
- Kingdom: Animalia
- Phylum: Arthropoda
- Class: Insecta
- Order: Odonata
- Suborder: Zygoptera
- Family: Platycnemididae
- Genus: Copera
- Species: C. superplatypes

Binomial name
- Copera superplatypes Fraser, 1927

Species of damselfly

Copera superplatypes is a species of white-legged damselfly in the family Platycnemididae.
