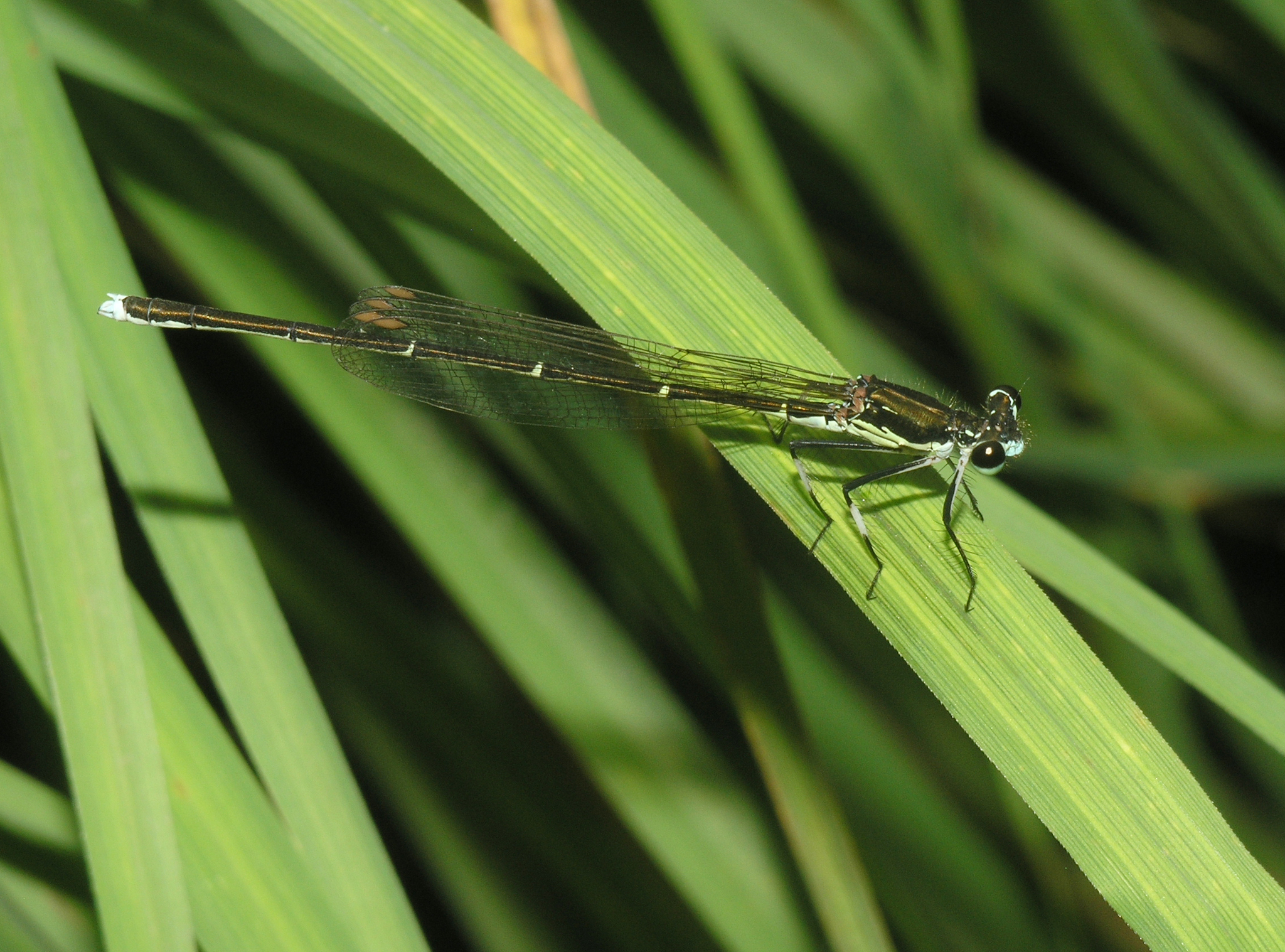

Scientific classification
- Kingdom: Animalia
- Phylum: Arthropoda
- Class: Insecta
- Order: Odonata
- Suborder: Zygoptera
- Family: Platycnemididae
- Genus: Copera
- Species: C. tokyoensis

Binomial name
- Copera tokyoensis Asahina, 1948

= Copera tokyoensis =

Species of damselfly

. Copera tokyoensis is a species of white-legged damselfly in the family Platycnemididae. It can be found in Japan, China, and Korea.
