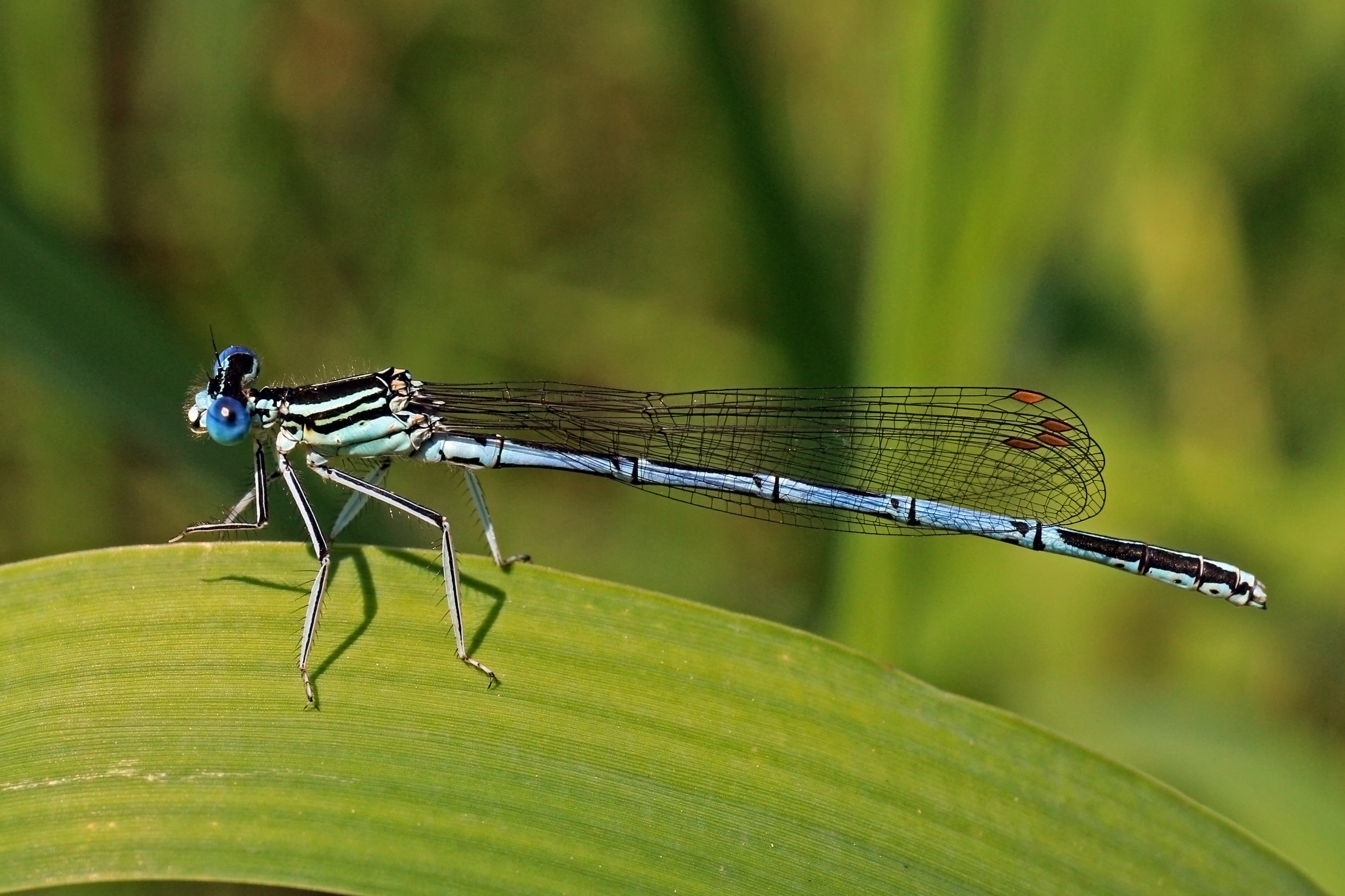
- Mature male
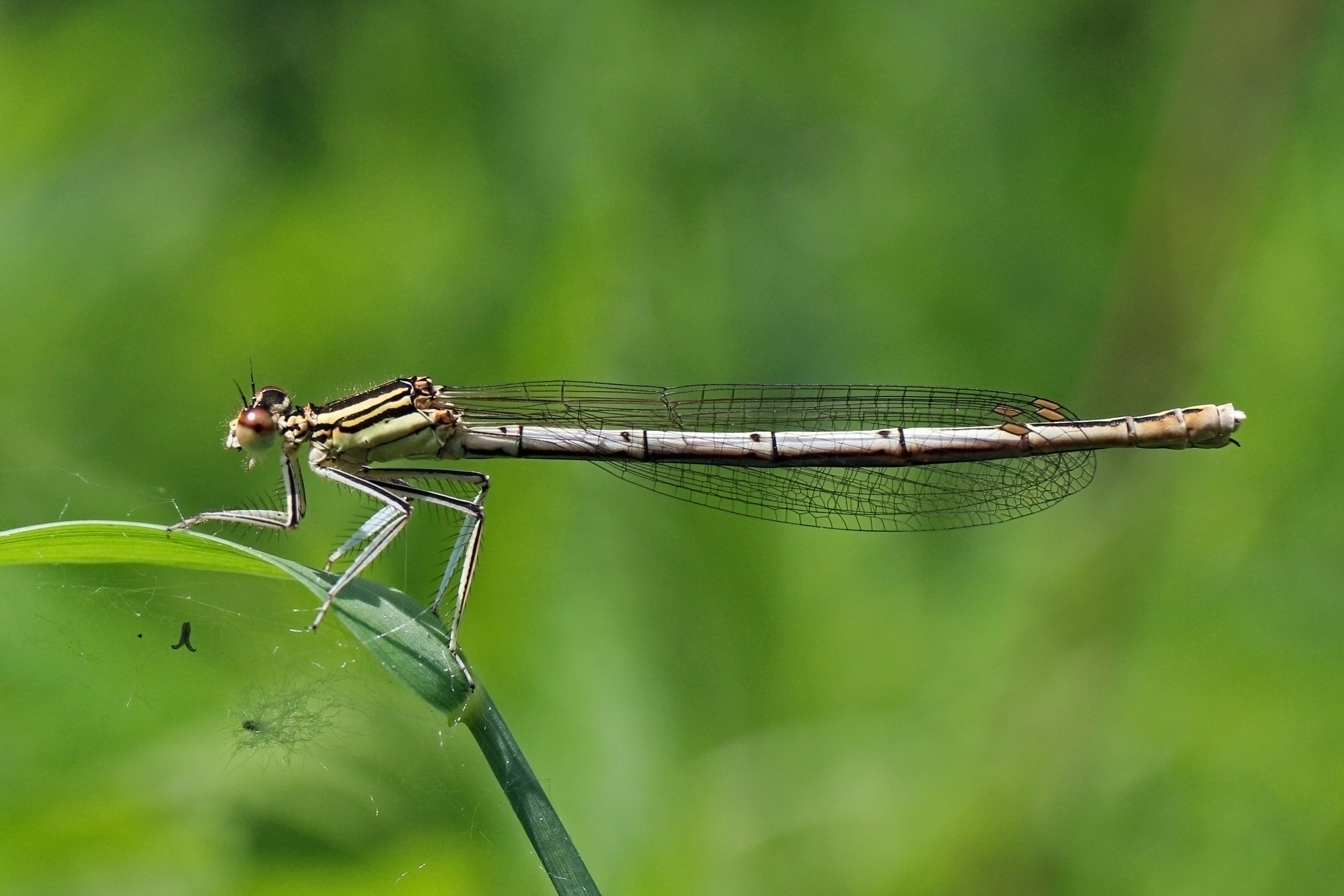
- Young female both in Warsaw, Poland

Conservation status
- Least Concern (IUCN 3.1)

Scientific classification
- Kingdom: Animalia
- Phylum: Arthropoda
- Clade: Pancrustacea
- Class: Insecta
- Order: Odonata
- Suborder: Zygoptera
- Family: Platycnemididae
- Genus: Platycnemis
- Species: P. pennipes

Binomial name
- Platycnemis pennipes (Pallas, 1771)

= White-legged damselfly =

Species of damselfly

The white-legged damselfly or blue featherleg (Platycnemis pennipes) is a damselfly of slow-flowing, muddy waters. It occurs from the Atlantic to Siberia and is often abundant throughout its range.

== Morphology ==
Platycnemis pennipes is about 32 millimetres (1.3 in) long. Mature adults differ from most other blue damselflies in having expanded white edges to the tibiae, paired black markings down most of the abdomen, broad pale brown double antehumeral stripes, wider head and a pale brown pterostigmata.

The male has a blue abdomen that is often pale and usually has a greenish thorax. The female is a very pale yellow-green colour with black markings.

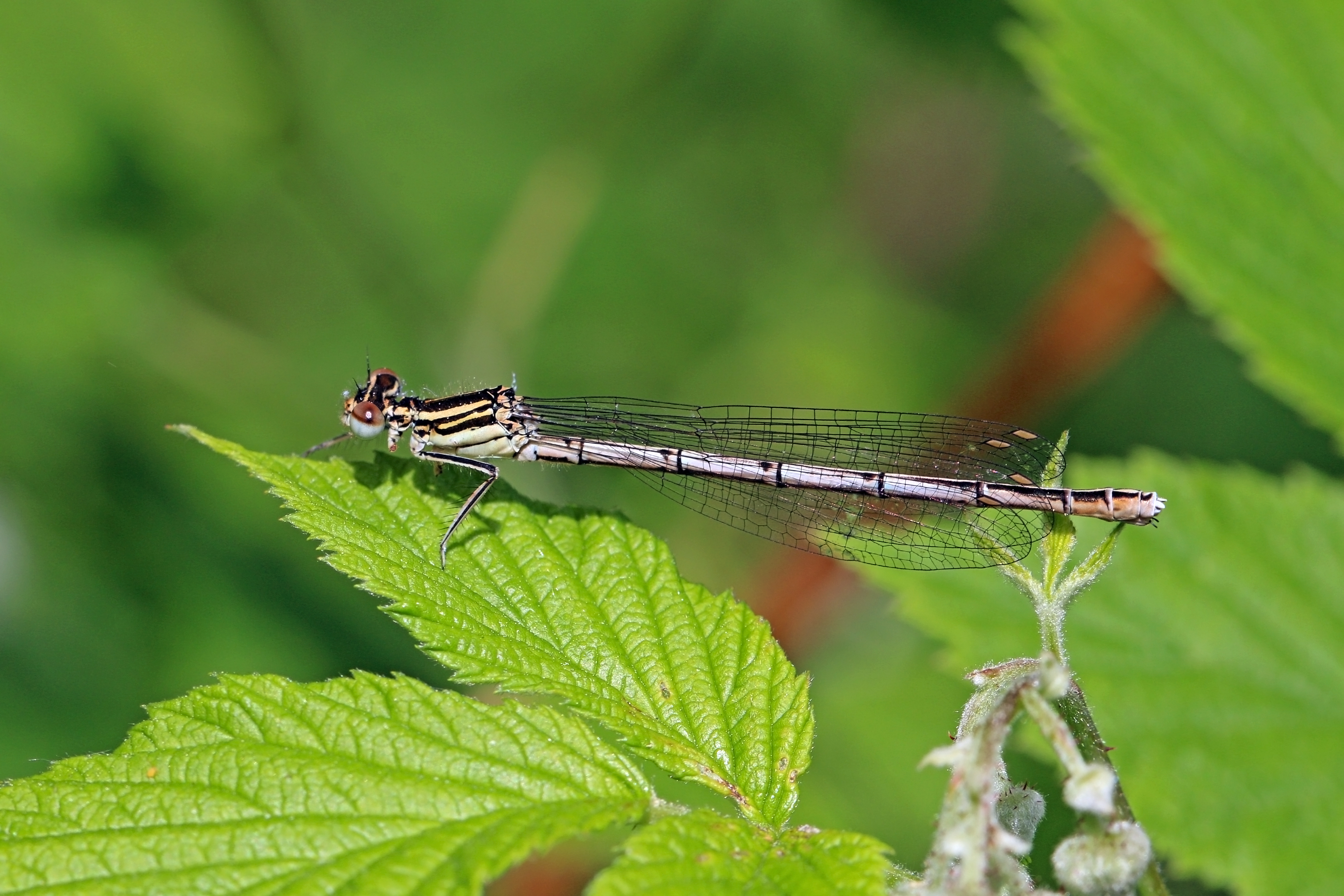
immature female
Estonia

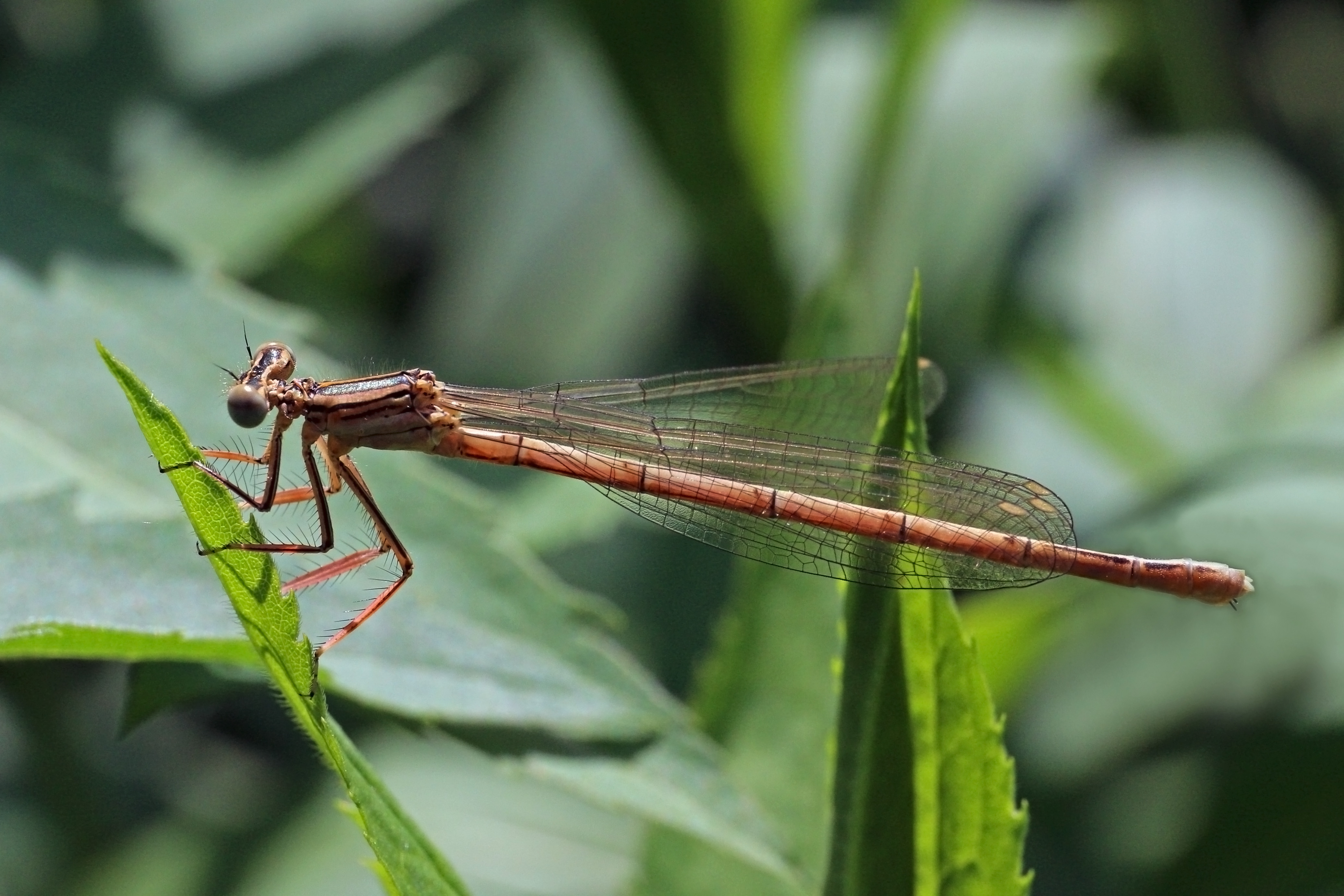
immature female
Warsaw, Poland

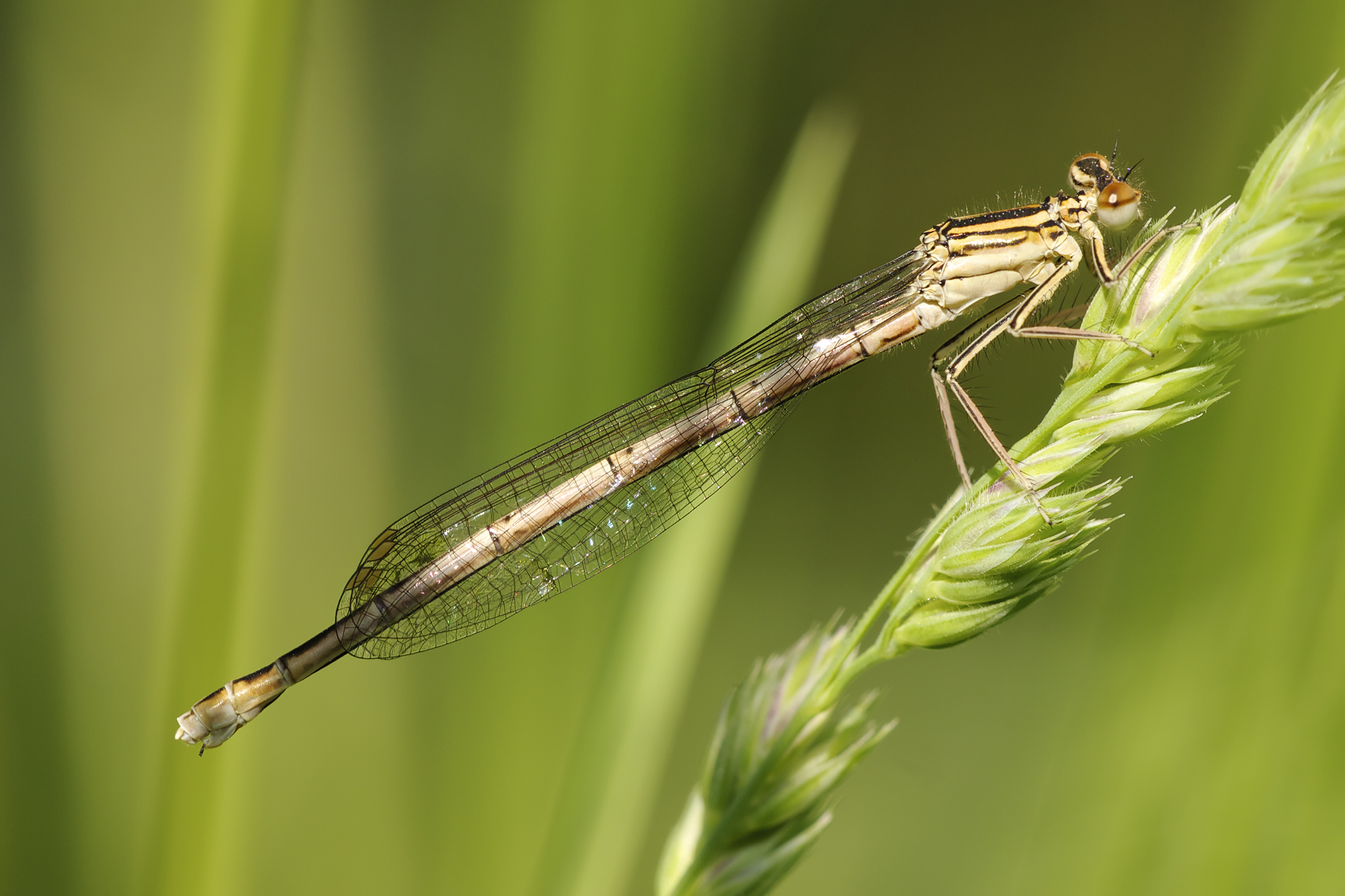
immature female
Chemnitz, Germany

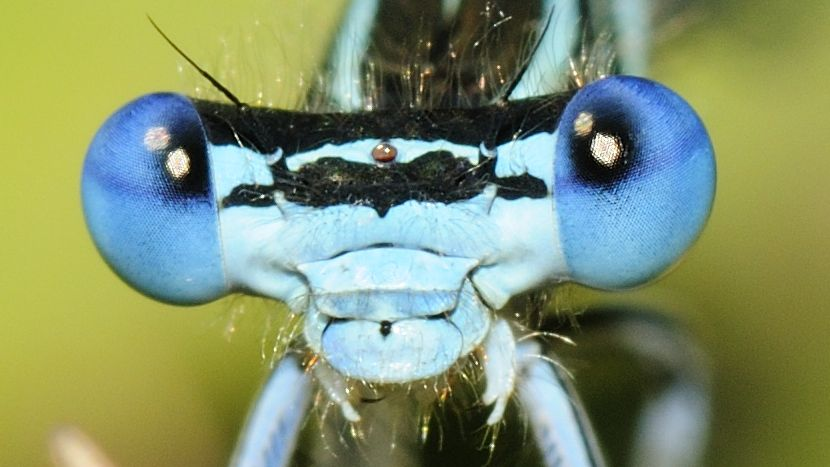
detail of male head

== Breeding ==
This species favours unshaded slow-flowing sections of muddy rivers with abundant floating vegetation. it has been recorded in tidal rivers and the larvae seem well able to tolerate brackish water. It also occurs in muddy streams but is rare in lakes or ponds of any sort. In north-west Europe, it is mostly confined to flowing waters.

The males are very territorial and use their enlarged legs to impress other individuals.

Elongated eggs are laid whilst in tandem, into emergent stems and especially the underside of floating leaves. The larvae live amongst bottom debris and emerge after two years.

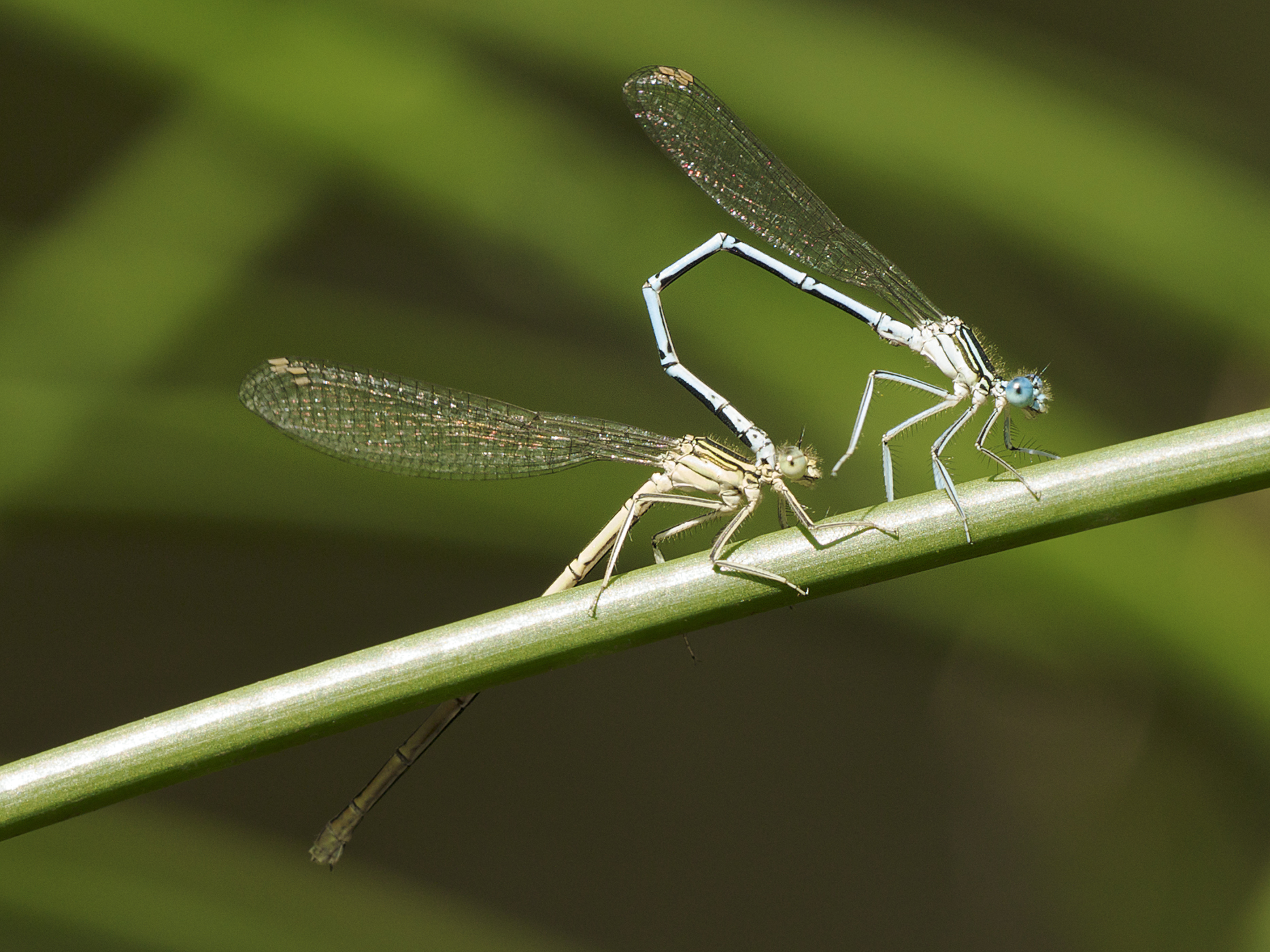
in tandem

mating

== Behaviour ==
After emerging, adults tend to congregate in the shelter of tall vegetation, although some immatures wander away from water and have been found five kilometres away from the nearest breeding site.
