= Austrolestes aleison =

Western ringtail

Conservation status
- Least Concern (IUCN 3.1)

Scientific classification
- Kingdom: Animalia
- Phylum: Arthropoda
- Clade: Pancrustacea
- Class: Insecta
- Order: Odonata
- Suborder: Zygoptera
- Family: Lestidae
- Genus: Austrolestes
- Species: A. aleison

Binomial name
- Austrolestes aleison Watson & Max Moulds, 1979

Species of damselfly

Austrolestes aleison is an Australian species of damselfly in the family Lestidae, commonly known as a western ringtail. It is endemic to south-western Australia, where it inhabits pools, ponds and lakes.

Austrolestes aleison is a medium-sized to large damselfly, the male is blue and black.

== Etymology ==
The genus name Austrolestes combines the prefix austro- (from Latin auster, meaning “south wind”, hence “southern”) with Lestes, a genus name derived from Greek λῃστής (lēstēs, “robber”).

The species name aleison is derived from the Greek ἄλεισον (aleison, "goblet"). In 1979, Tony Watson and Max Moulds named the species after the goblet-shaped mark on segment 2 of the male abdomen.

== Gallery ==
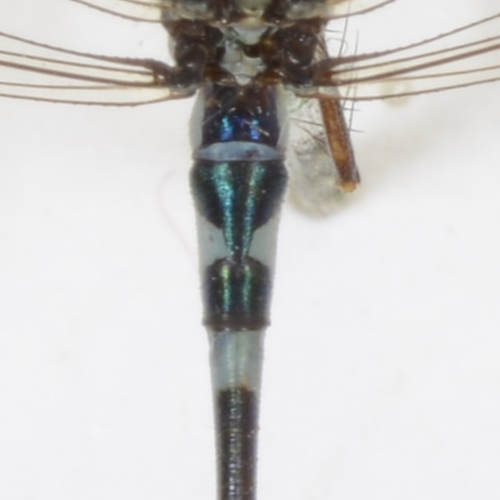
Goblet shape on the tail of a male Austrolestes aleison

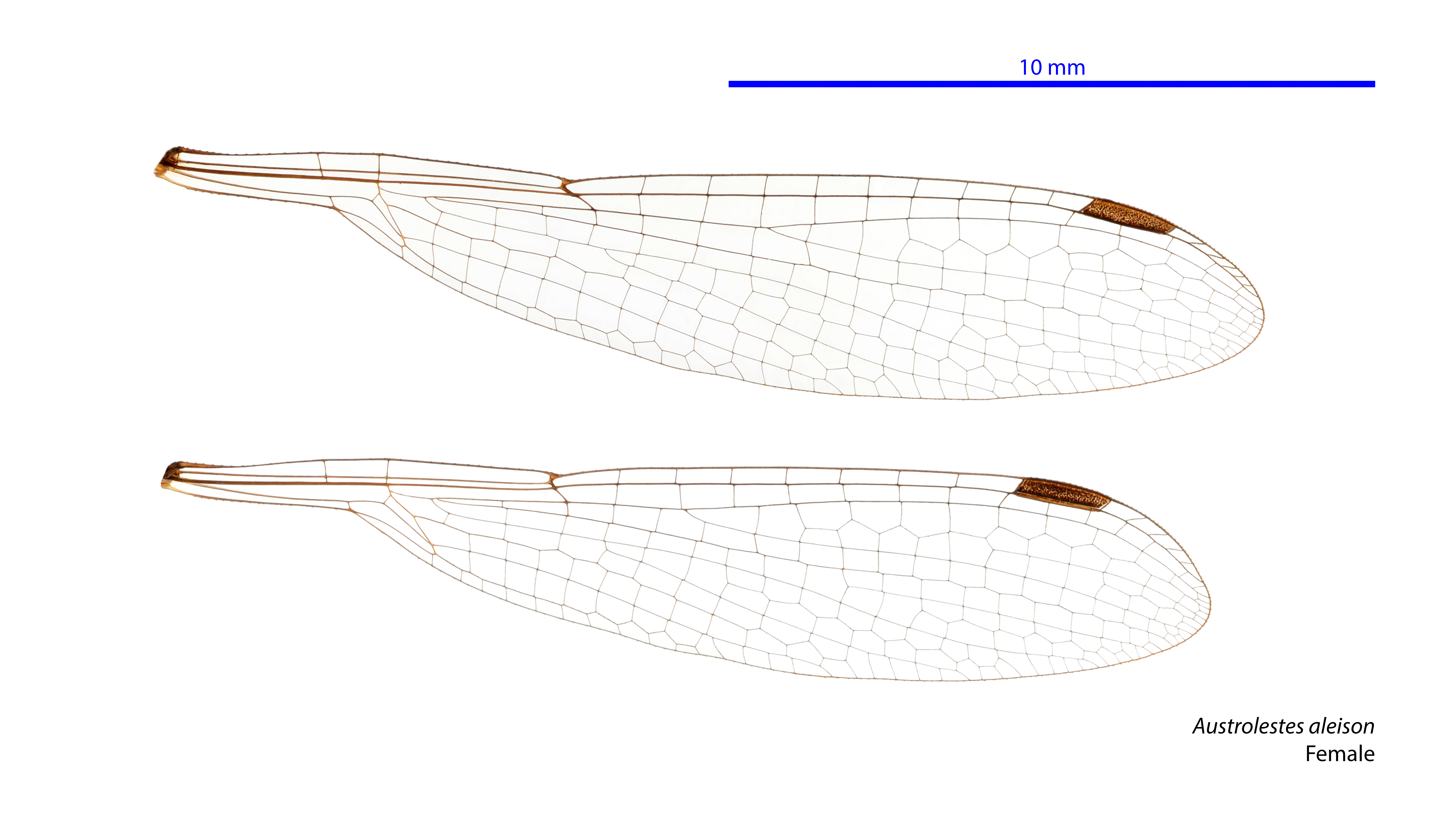
Female wings

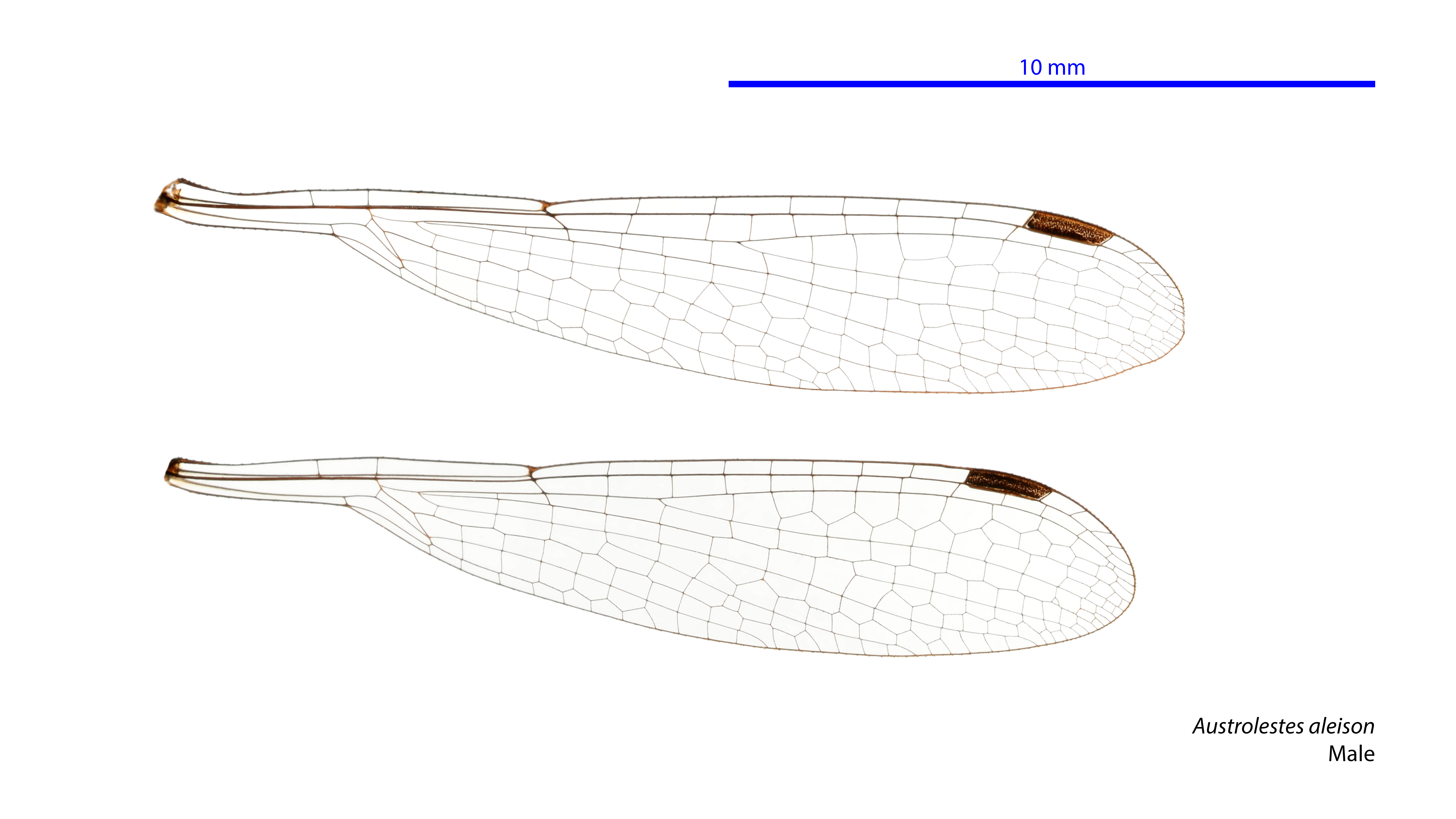
Male wings

== See also ==
- List of Odonata species of Australia
