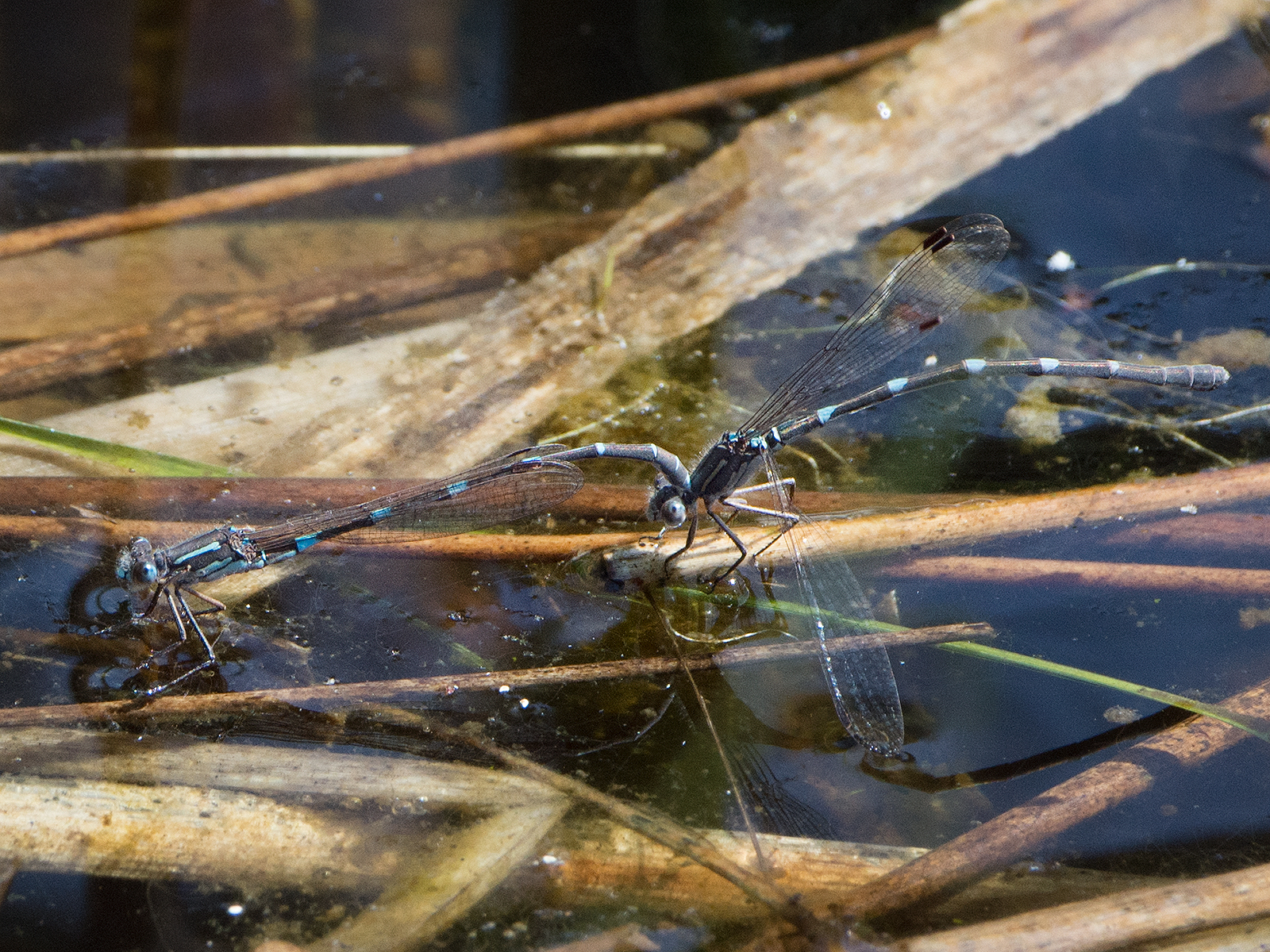
- Mating pair

Conservation status
- Least Concern (IUCN 3.1)

Scientific classification
- Kingdom: Animalia
- Phylum: Arthropoda
- Clade: Pancrustacea
- Class: Insecta
- Order: Odonata
- Suborder: Zygoptera
- Family: Lestidae
- Genus: Austrolestes
- Species: A. io

Binomial name
- Austrolestes io (Selys, 1862)

Synonyms
- Lestes io Selys, 1862

= Austrolestes io =

Iota ringtail

Species of damselfly

Austrolestes io is an Australian species of damselfly in the family Lestidae, commonly known as an iota ringtail. It has been found in both south-western Australia as well as south-eastern Australia where it inhabits pools, lakes and ponds.

Austrolestes io is a medium-sized to large damselfly, the male is light blue and brown.

== Etymology ==
The genus name Austrolestes combines the prefix austro- (from Latin auster, meaning “south wind”, hence “southern”) with Lestes, a genus name derived from Greek λῃστής (lēstēs, “robber”).

The species name io is named after Io, a figure from Greek mythology.

== Gallery ==
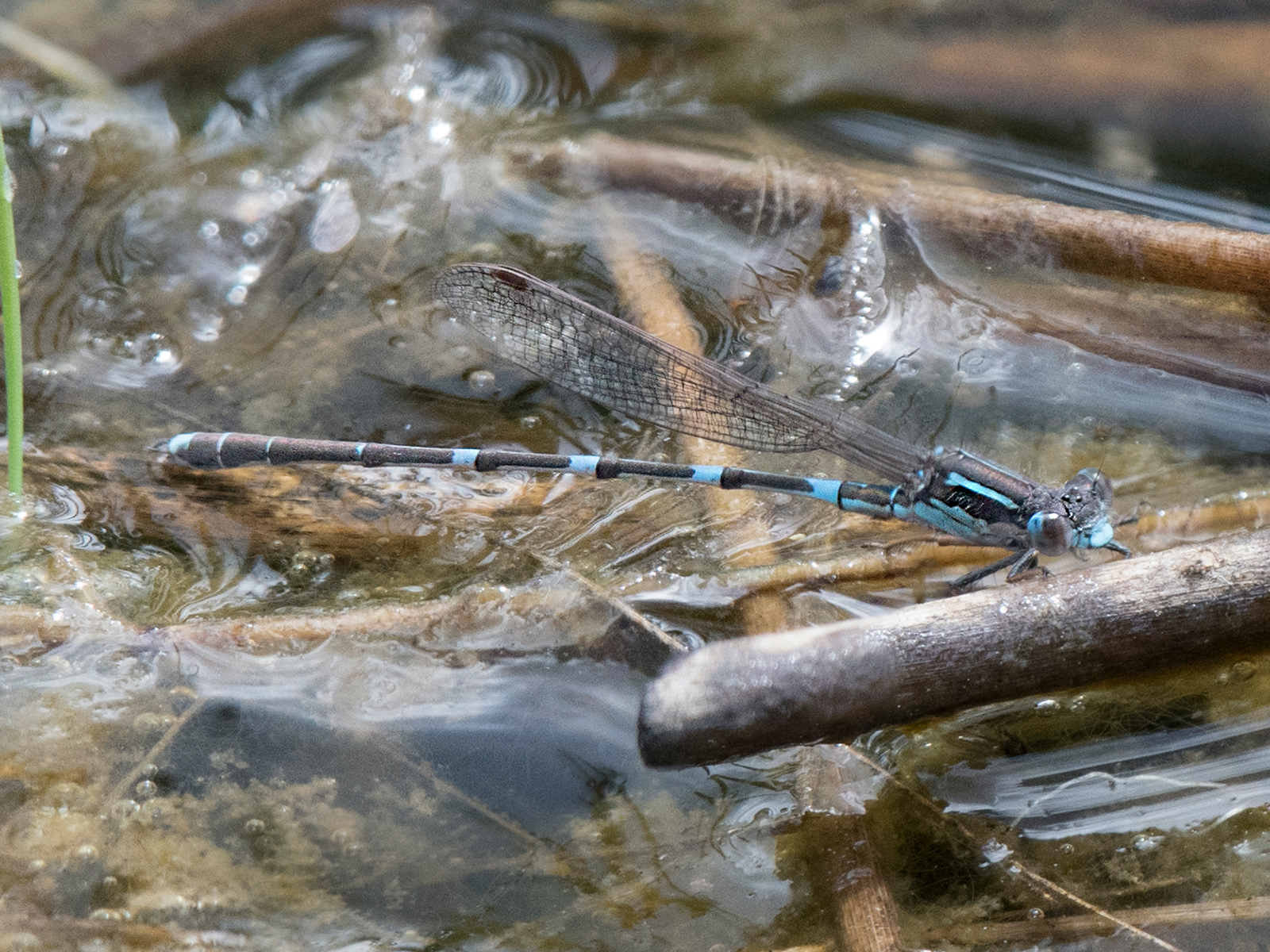
Male

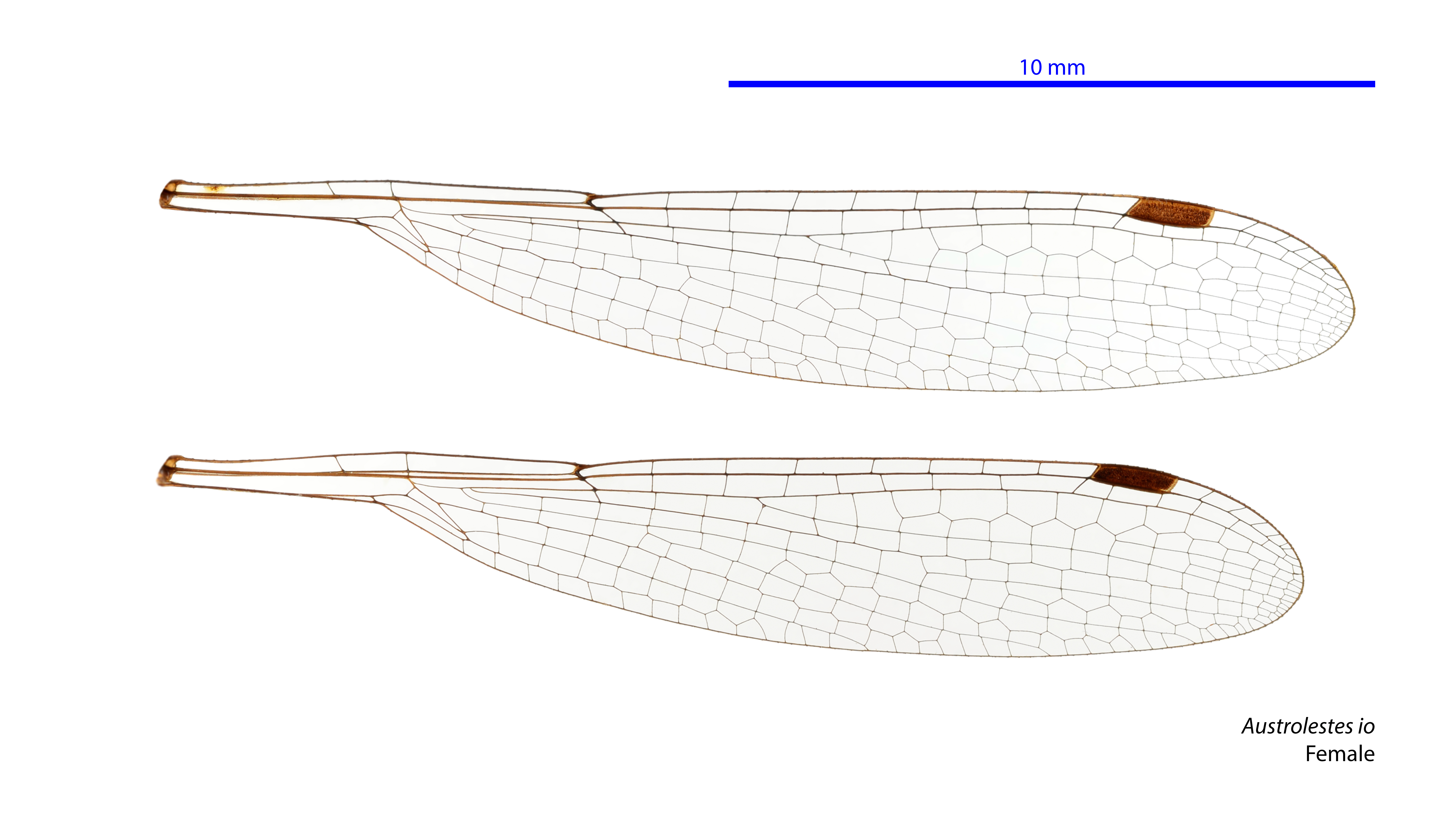
Female wings

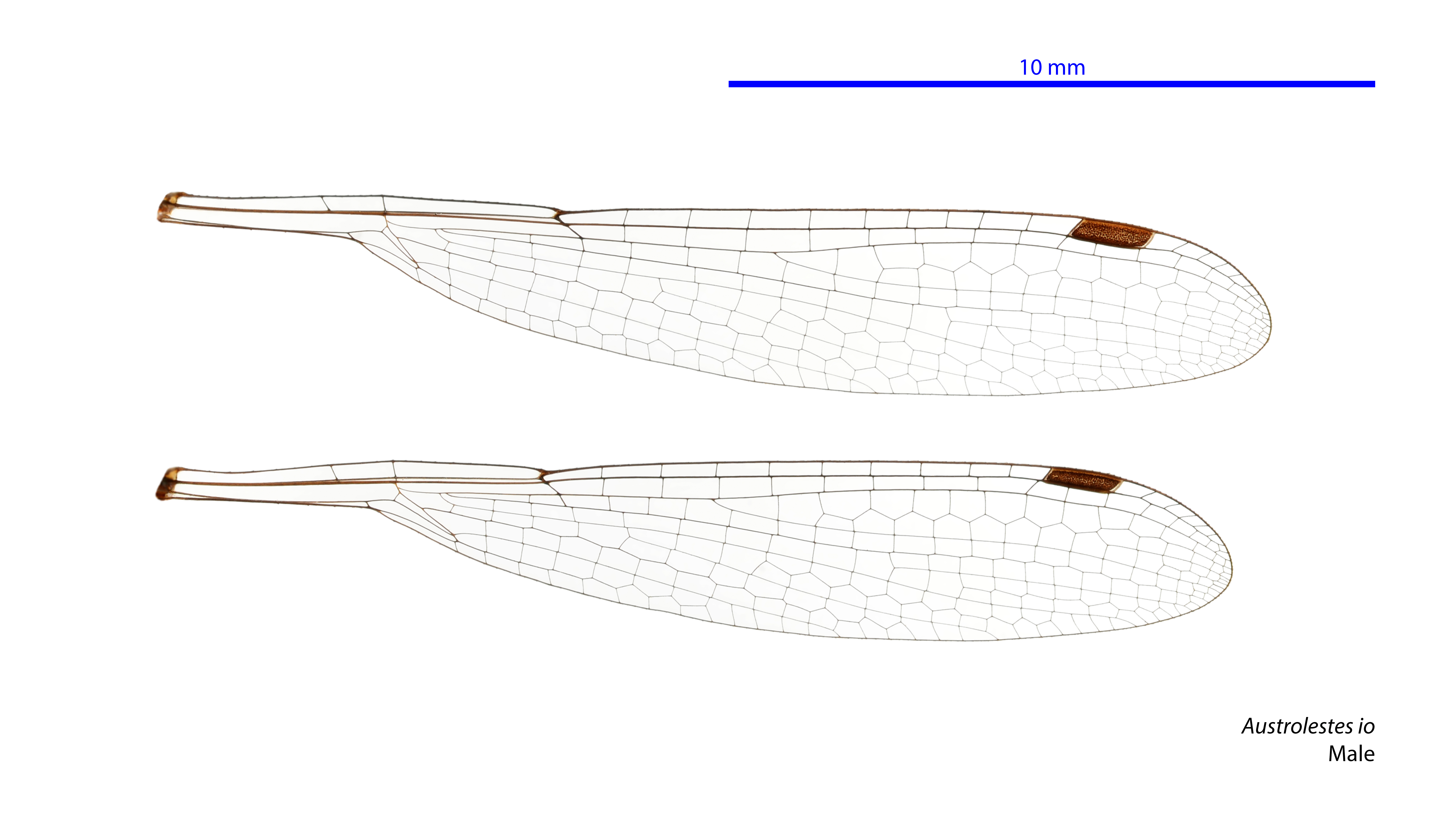
Male wings

== See also ==
- List of Odonata species of Australia
