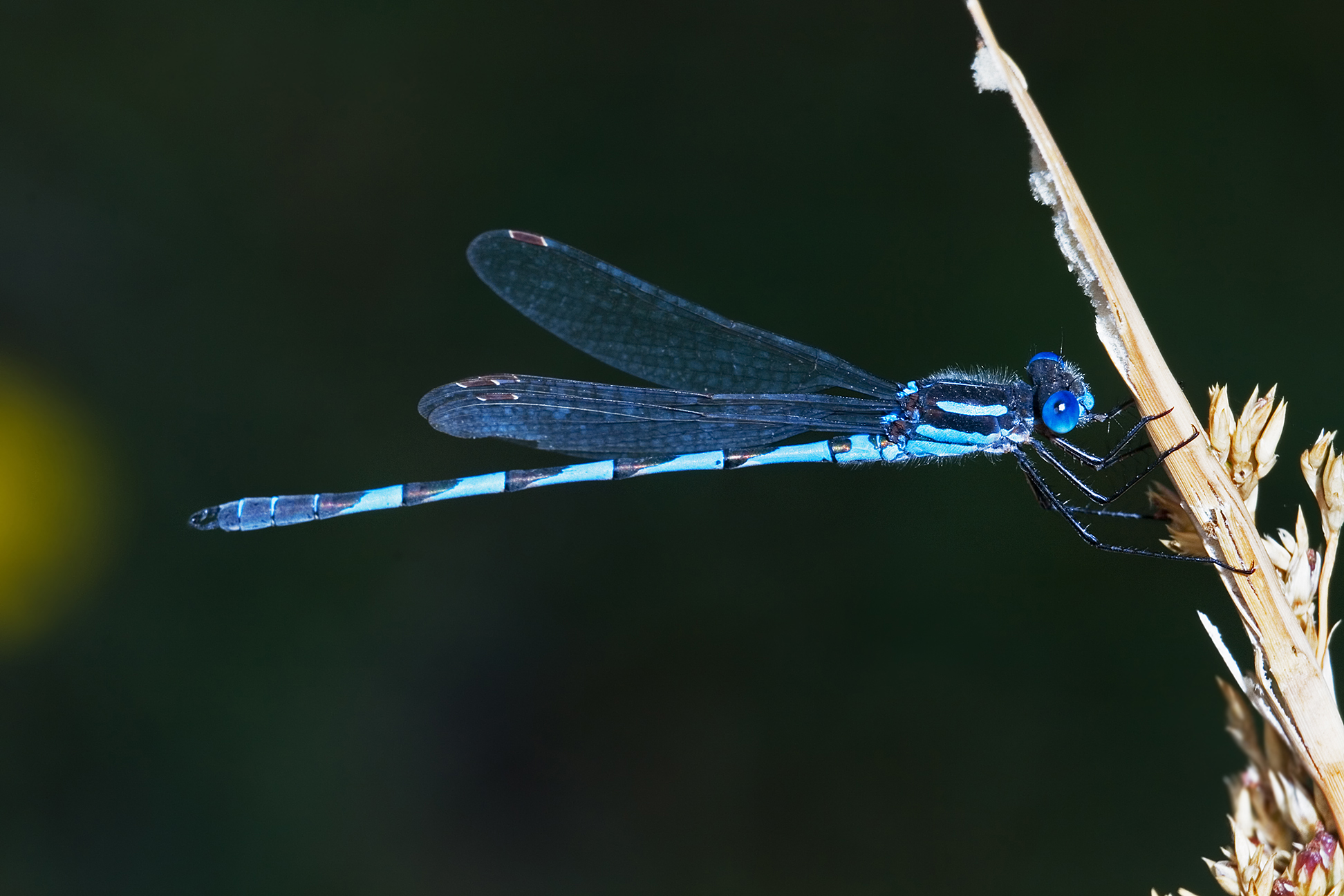
- Blue Ringtail (Austrolestes annulosus)

Scientific classification
- Kingdom: Animalia
- Phylum: Arthropoda
- Clade: Pancrustacea
- Class: Insecta
- Order: Odonata
- Suborder: Zygoptera
- Family: Lestidae
- Genus: Austrolestes; Tillyard, 1913

Type species
- Austrolestes cingulatus

Synonyms
- Ceylonolestes Kennedy, 1920

= Austrolestes =

Genus of damselflies

Austrolestes is a genus of medium to large-sized damselflies in the family Lestidae.

== Description ==
Austrolestes damselflies sit with their wings folded completely back. Males are usually bright blue and black, the females duller.

== Distribution ==
Members of this genus are found in Australia, New Zealand and South Pacific islands.

== Etymology ==
The genus name Austrolestes combines the prefix austro- (from Latin auster, meaning “south wind”, hence “southern”) with Lestes, a genus name derived from Greek λῃστής (lēstēs, “robber”). The name refers to a southern representative of that group.

== Species ==
The genus Austrolestes includes the following species:

Male	Female	Scientific name	Common name	Distribution
		Austrolestes aleison Watson & Moulds, 1979	Western ringtail	south-western Australia
		Austrolestes analis (Rambur, 1842)	Slender ringtail	South Australia, Victoria, New South Wales and Tasmania.
		Austrolestes annulosus (Selys, 1862)	Blue ringtail	Australia
		Austrolestes aridus (Tillyard, 1908)	Inland ringtail	Australia
		Austrolestes cingulatus (Burmeister, 1839)	Metallic ringtail	Tasmania, Victoria and eastern New South Wales
		Austrolestes colensonis (White, 1846)	Blue damselfly, kekewai	New Zealand
		Austrolestes io (Selys, 1862)	Iota ringtail	south-western Australia and south-eastern Australia
		Austrolestes leda (Selys, 1862)	Wandering ringtail	eastern Australia
		Austrolestes minjerriba Watson, 1979	Dune ringtail	northern New South Wales and southern Queensland
		Austrolestes psyche (Hagen in Selys, 1862)	Cup ringtail	south-eastern Australia

== Etymology ==
The genus name Austrolestes is derived from the latin word auster meaning south wind, hence south; and the damselfly genus Lestes, which is from the Greek word λῃστής meaning a robber. In 1913, Robin Tillyard described the genus Austrolestes as having characters similar to the very large genus Lestes, which, unlike Austrolestes, sit with their wings outspread.
