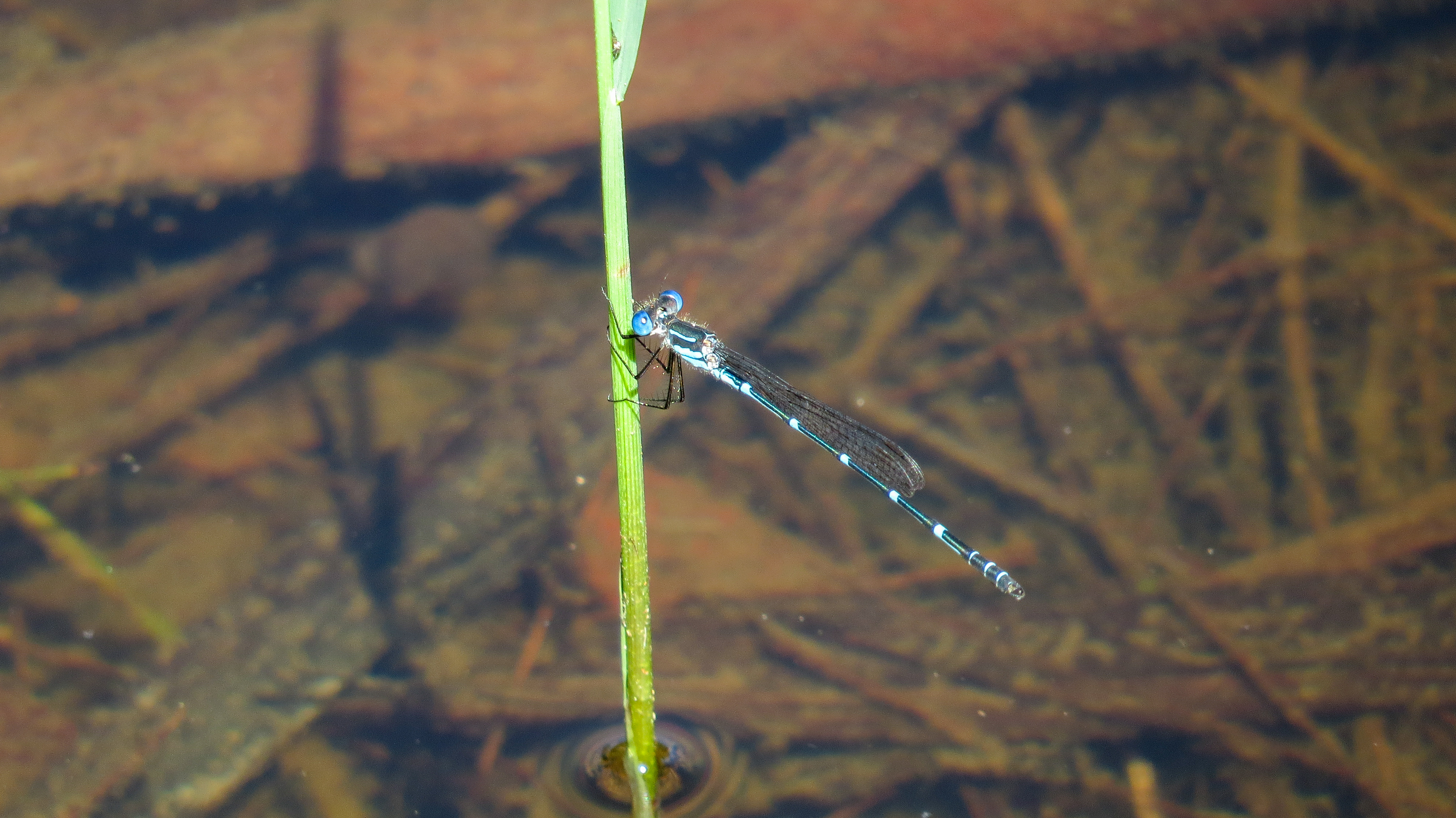
- Male

Conservation status
- Least Concern (IUCN 3.1)

Scientific classification
- Kingdom: Animalia
- Phylum: Arthropoda
- Clade: Pancrustacea
- Class: Insecta
- Order: Odonata
- Suborder: Zygoptera
- Family: Lestidae
- Genus: Austrolestes
- Species: A. minjerriba

Binomial name
- Austrolestes minjerriba Watson, 1979

= Austrolestes minjerriba =

Dune ringtail

Species of damselfly

Austrolestes minjerriba is an Australian species of damselfly in the family Lestidae, commonly known as a dune ringtail. It is found in coastal areas of northern New South Wales and southern Queensland where it inhabits acidic dune lakes and swamps.

Austrolestes minjerriba is a medium-sized to large damselfly, the male is light blue and black.

== Etymology ==
The genus name Austrolestes combines the prefix austro- (from Latin auster, meaning “south wind”, hence “southern”) with Lestes, a genus name derived from Greek λῃστής (lēstēs, “robber”).

The species name minjerriba is the Aboriginal name for North Stradbroke Island, where the species was first recorded.

== Gallery ==
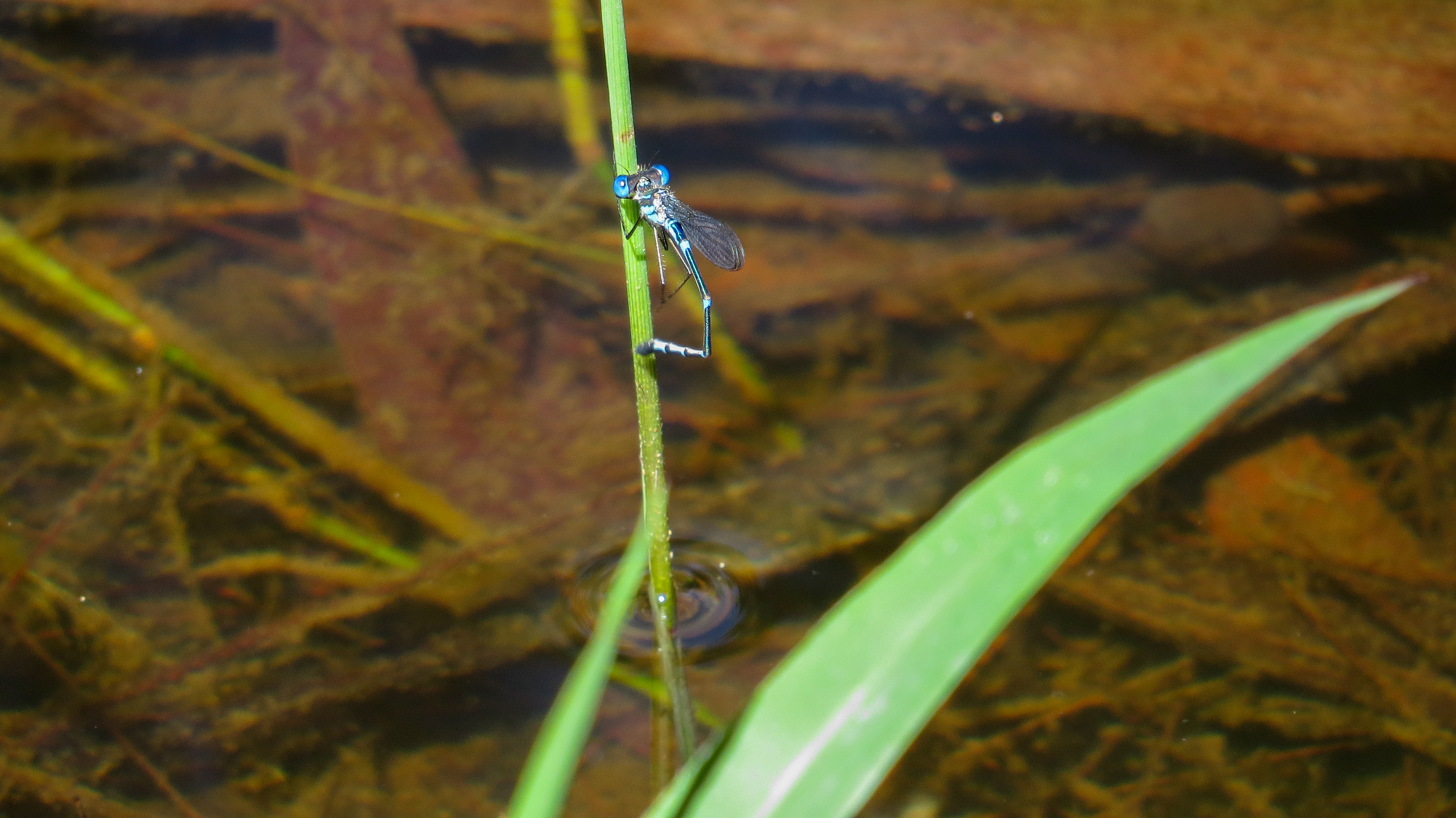
Male

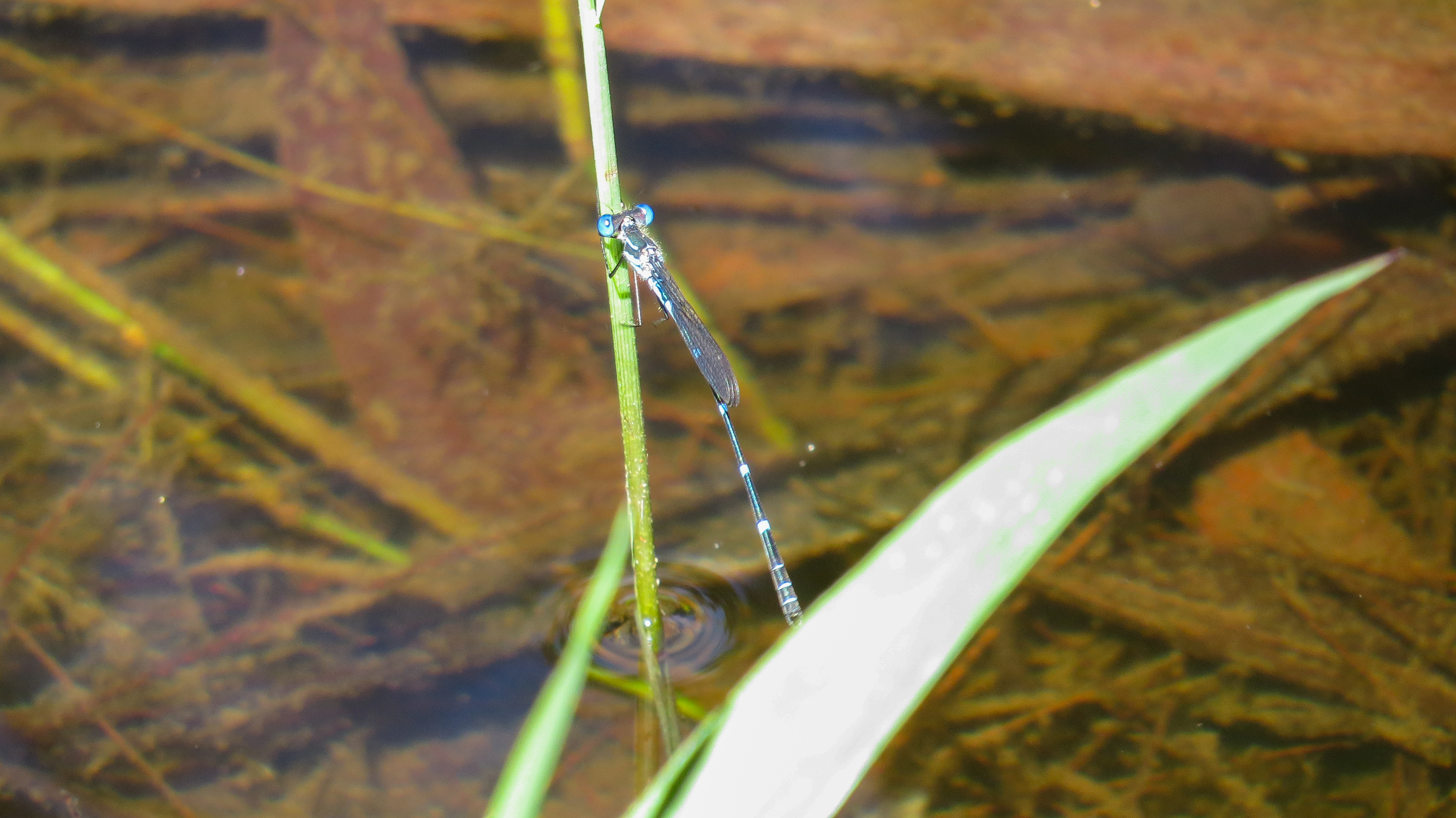
Male

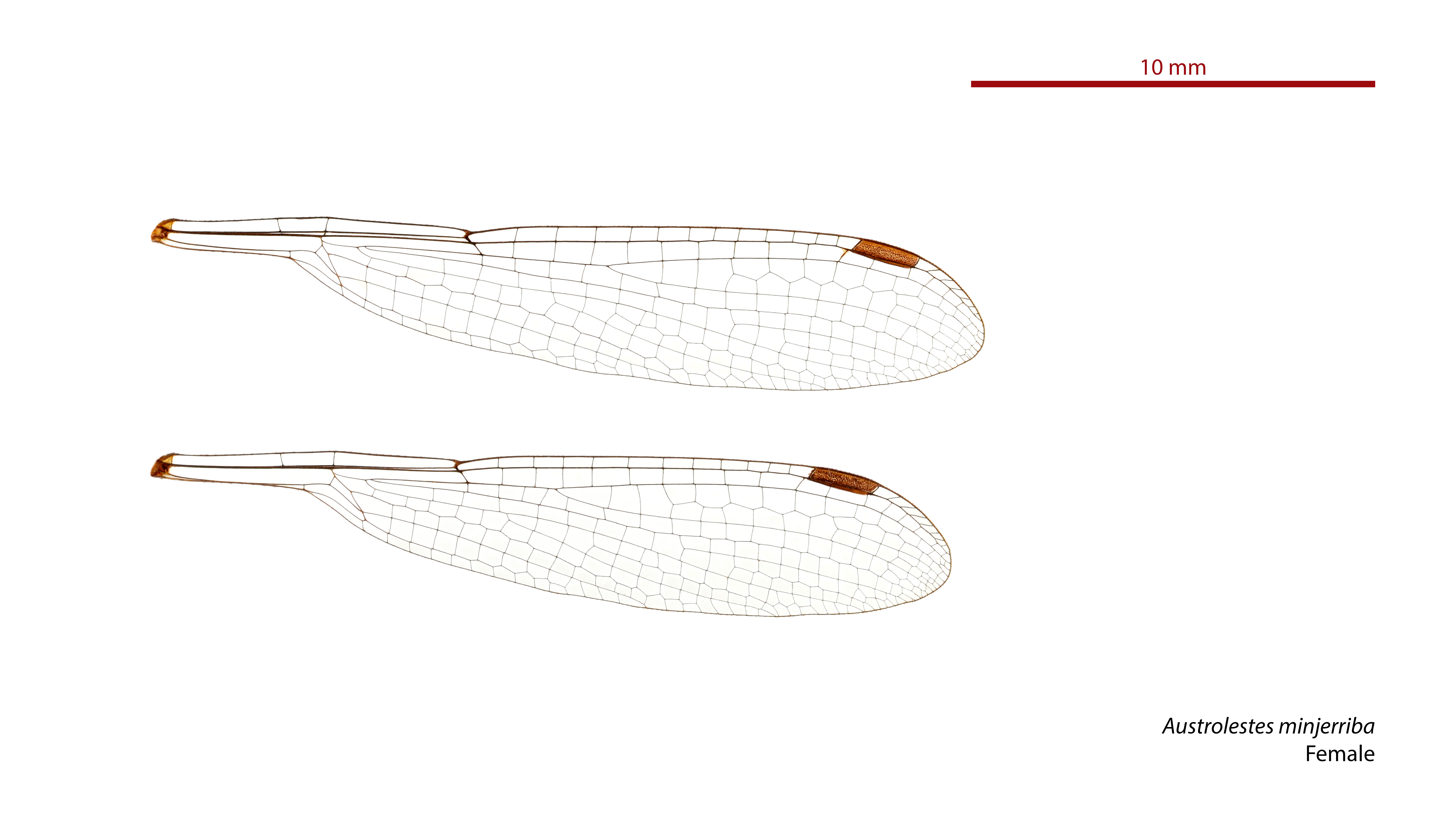
Female wings

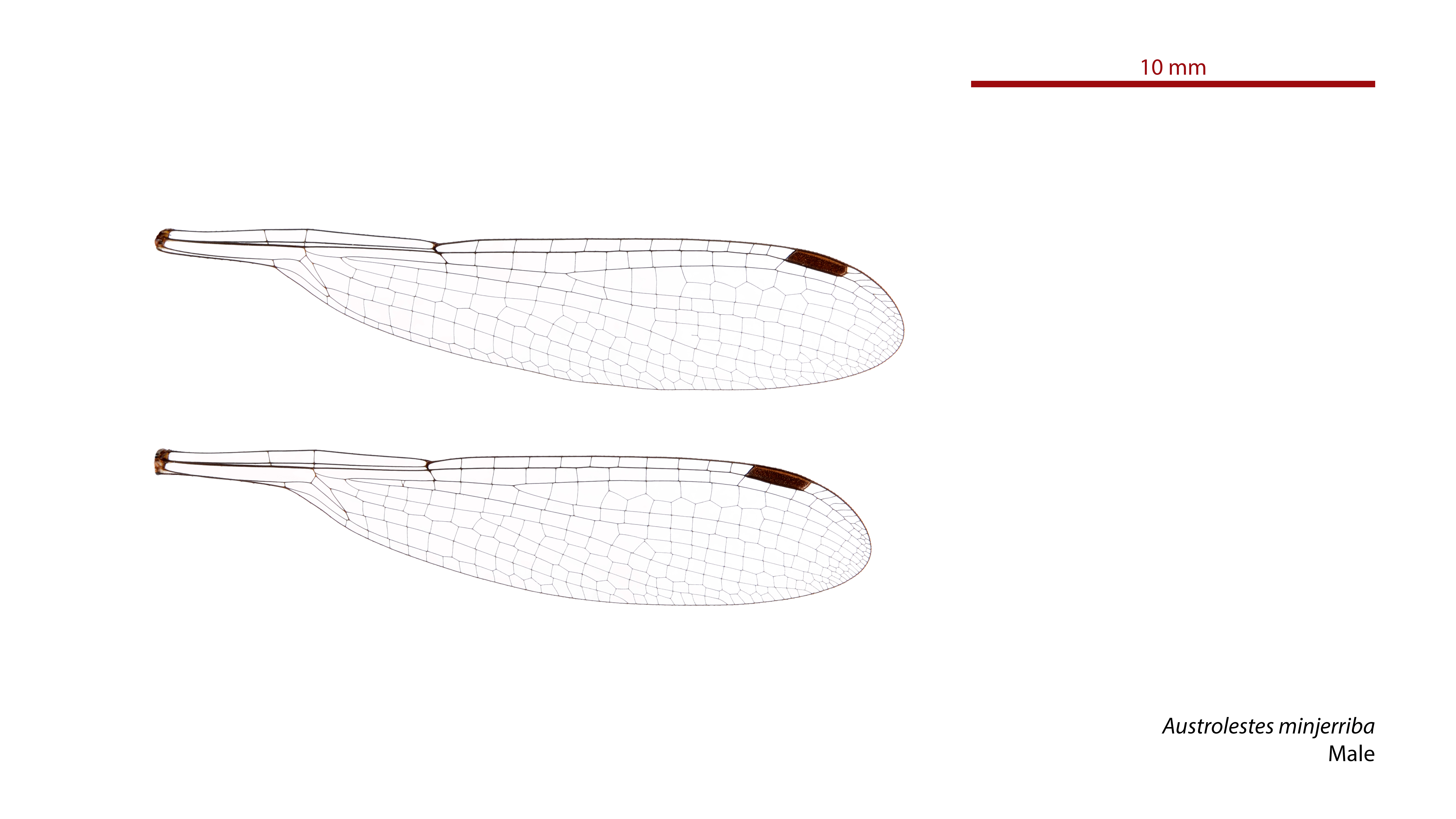
Male wings

== See also ==
- List of Odonata species of Australia
