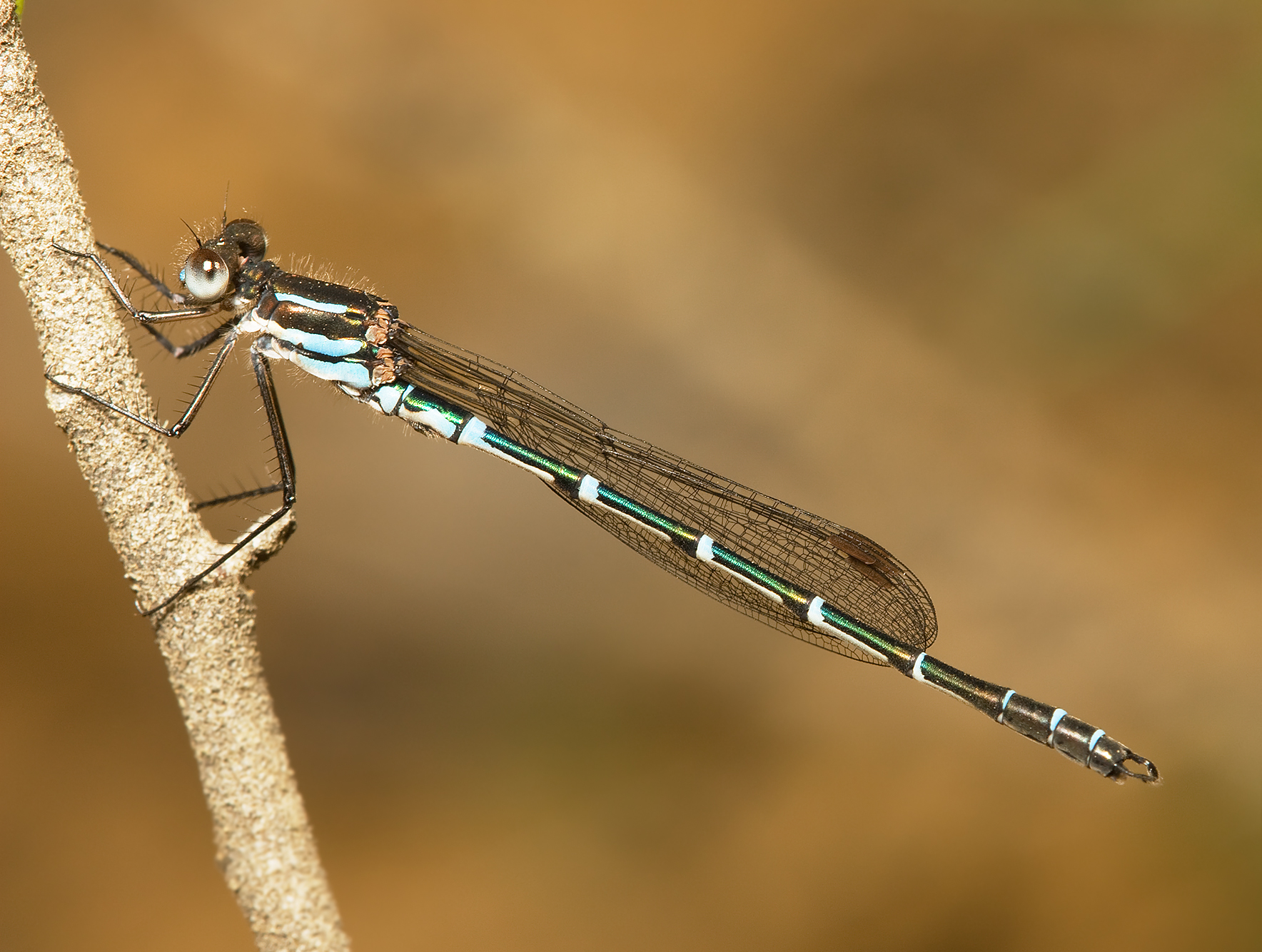
- Male
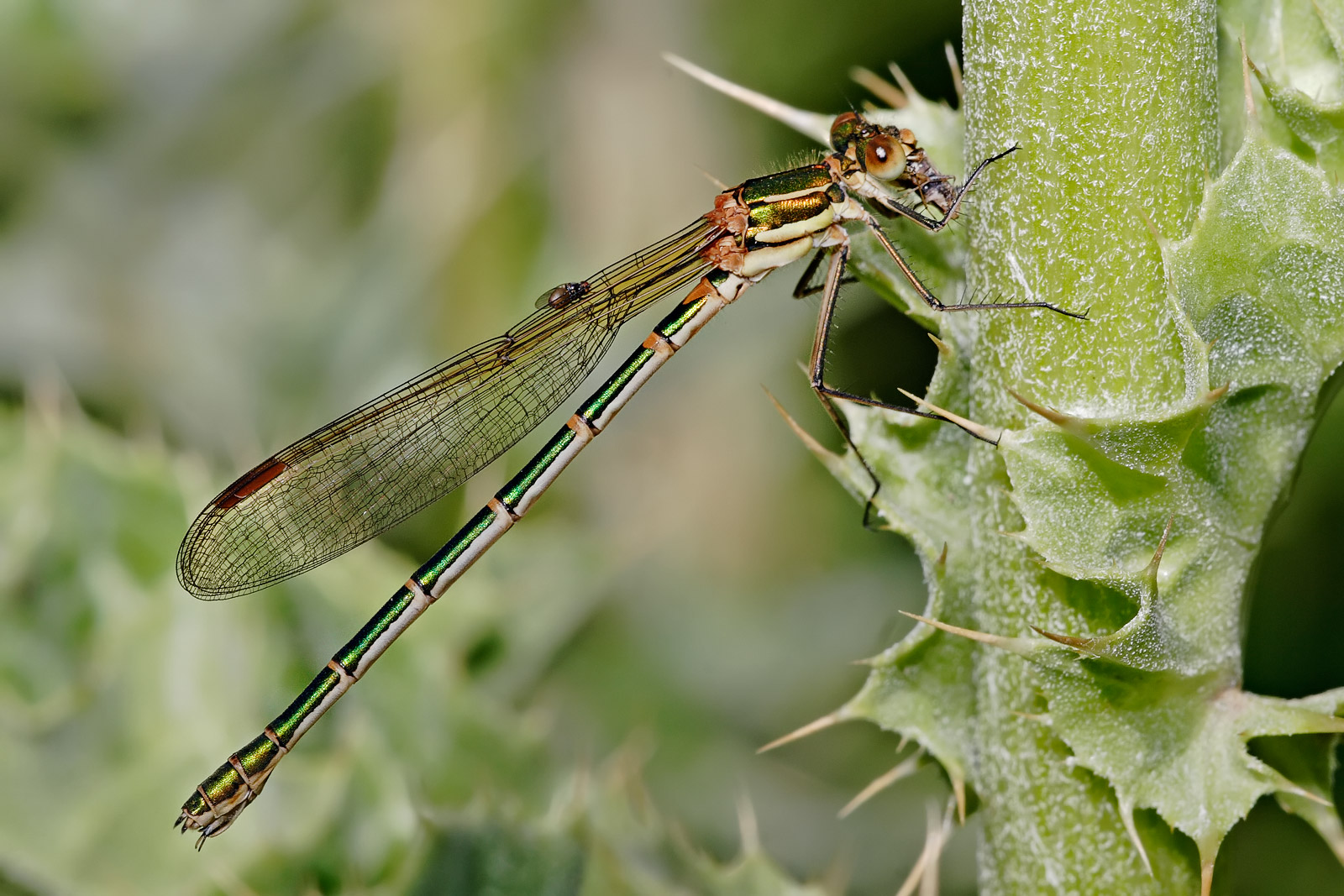
- Female

Conservation status
- Least Concern (IUCN 3.1)

Scientific classification
- Kingdom: Animalia
- Phylum: Arthropoda
- Clade: Pancrustacea
- Class: Insecta
- Order: Odonata
- Suborder: Zygoptera
- Family: Lestidae
- Genus: Austrolestes
- Species: A. cingulatus

Binomial name
- Austrolestes cingulatus (Burmeister, 1839)

Synonyms
- Agrion cingulatum Burmeister, 1839

= Metallic ringtail =

Species of damselfly

The metallic ringtail (Austrolestes cingulatus) is an Australian damselfly in the family Lestidae, It is widely distributed in Tasmania, Victoria and eastern New South Wales. It is a thin, medium-sized damselfly with a green and gold or bluish green and gold coloration. Each abdominal segment is marked by a pale "ring"; this, combined with its glossy metallic coloration, give it its common name of metallic ringtail.

It is active through October to March in still-water bodies such as rivers, lakes, ponds, swamps, and alpine bogs, being usually found amongst vegetation.

== Etymology ==
The genus name Austrolestes combines the prefix austro- (from Latin auster, meaning “south wind”, hence “southern”) with Lestes, a genus name derived from Greek λῃστής (lēstēs, “robber”).

The species name cingulatus is derived from the Latin cingulum ("girdle" or "sword-belt") and the suffix -atus ("provided with"), referring to rings at the bases of the abdominal segments.

== Gallery ==
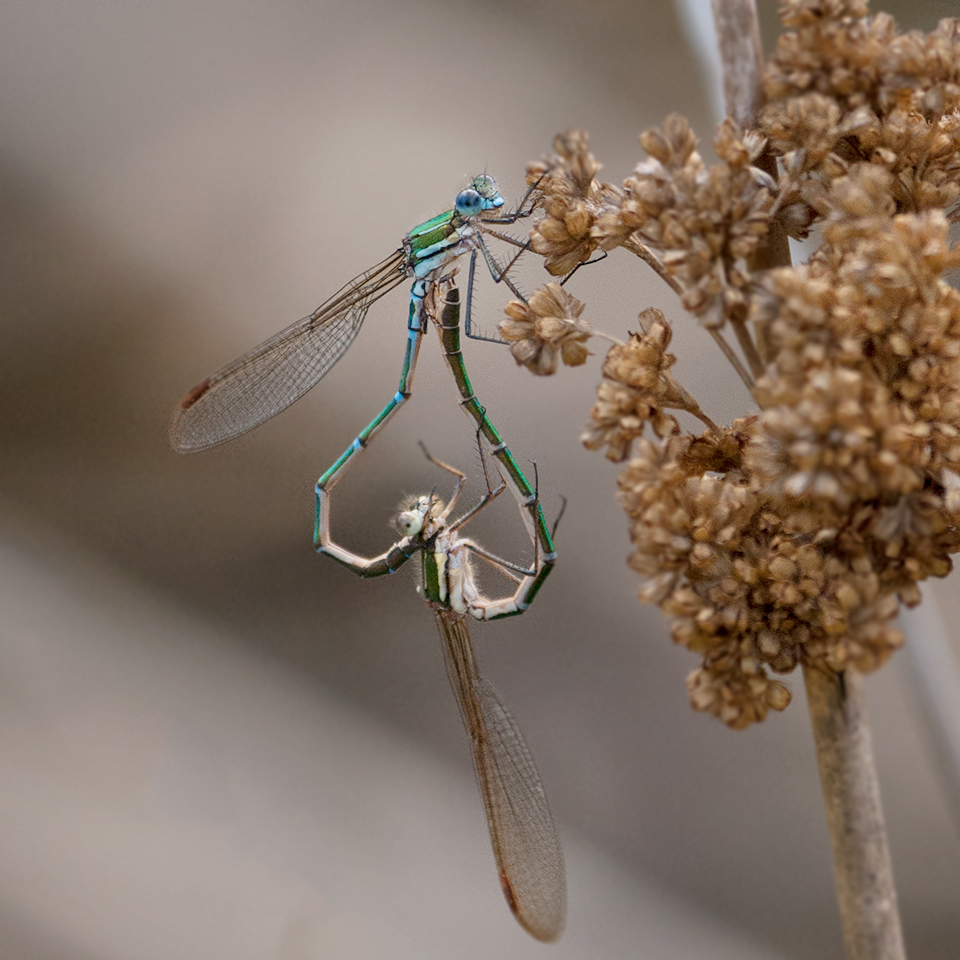
Mating pair

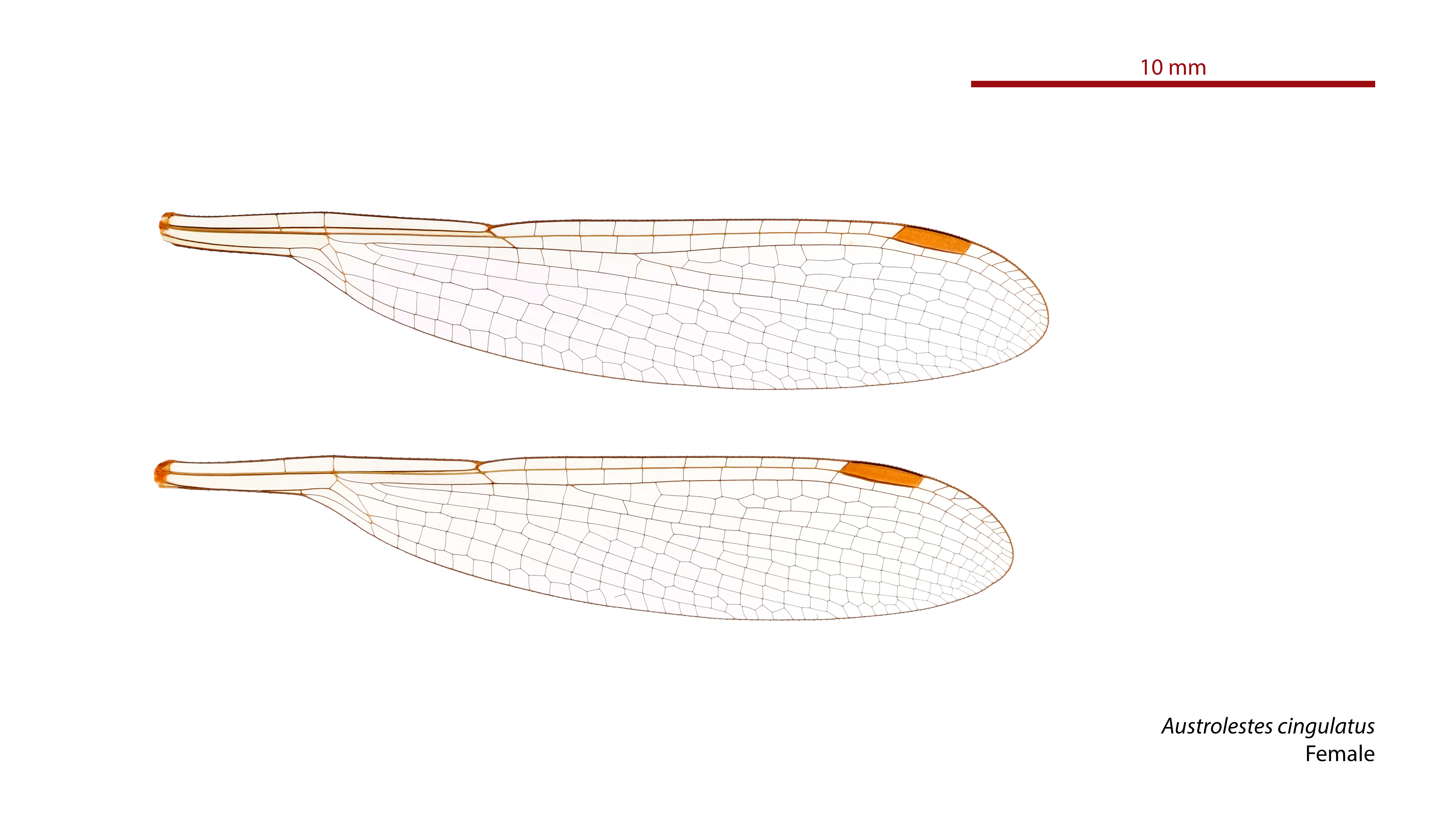
Female wings

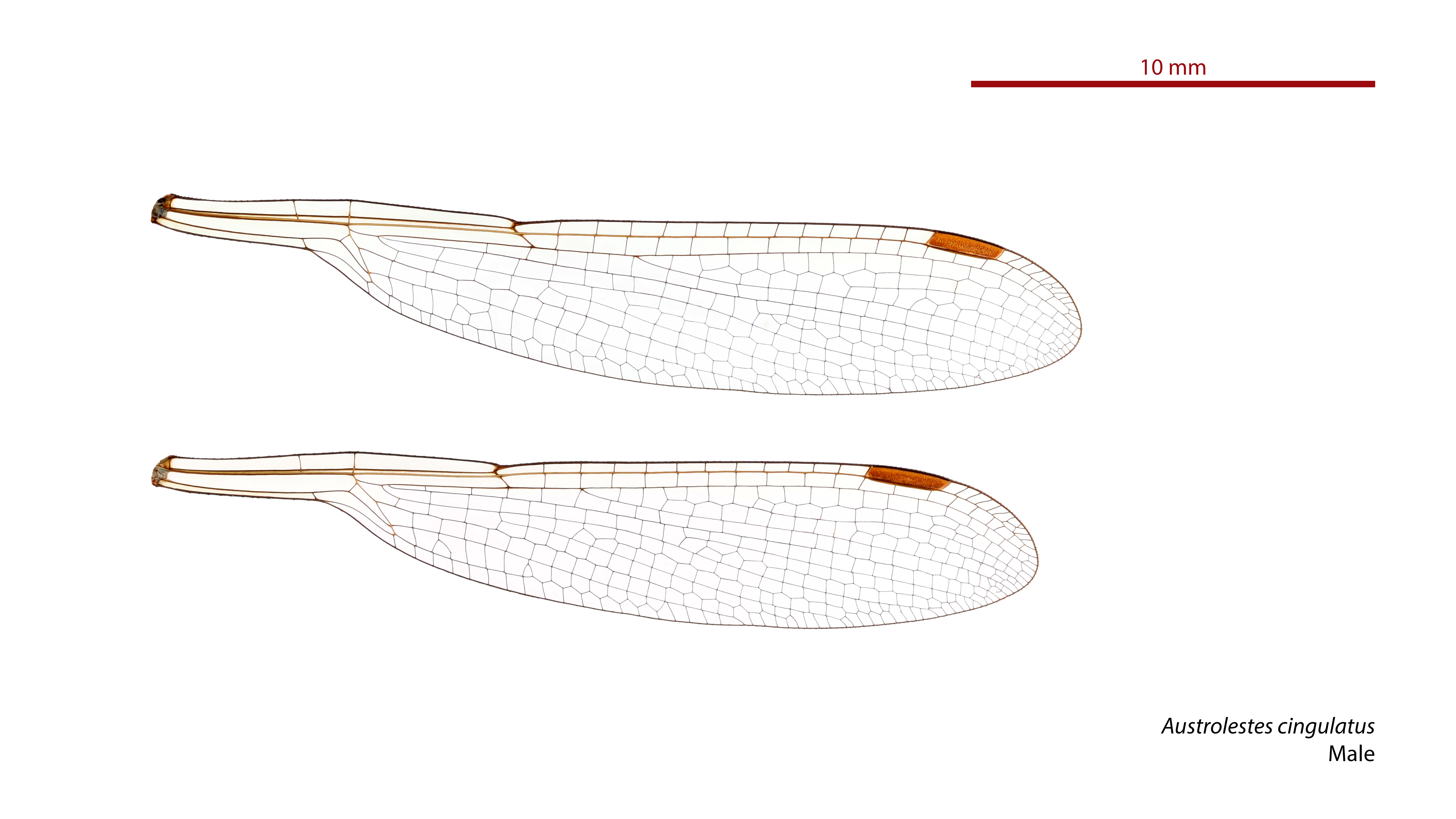
Male wings

== See also ==
- List of Odonata species of Australia
