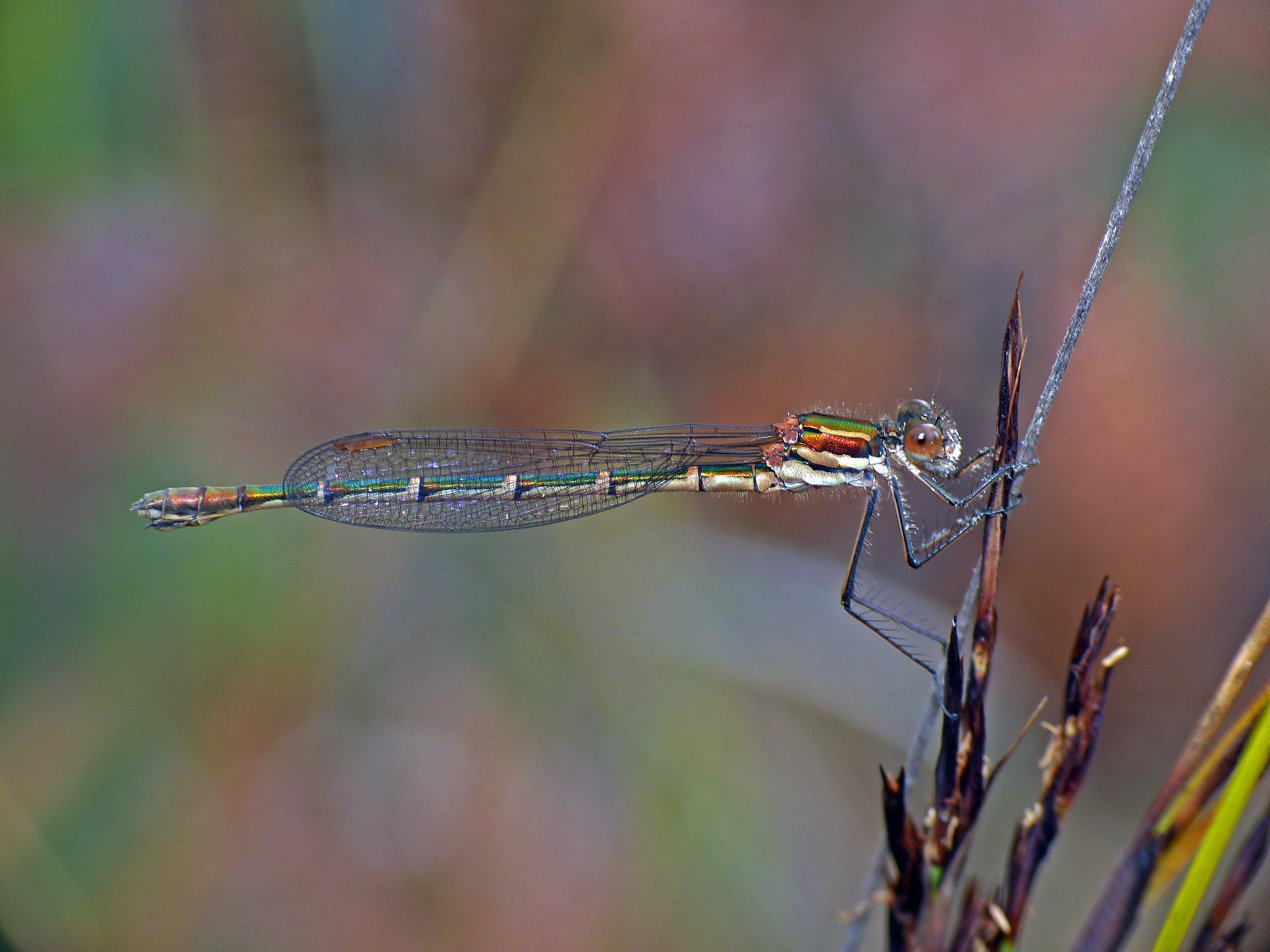
- Female
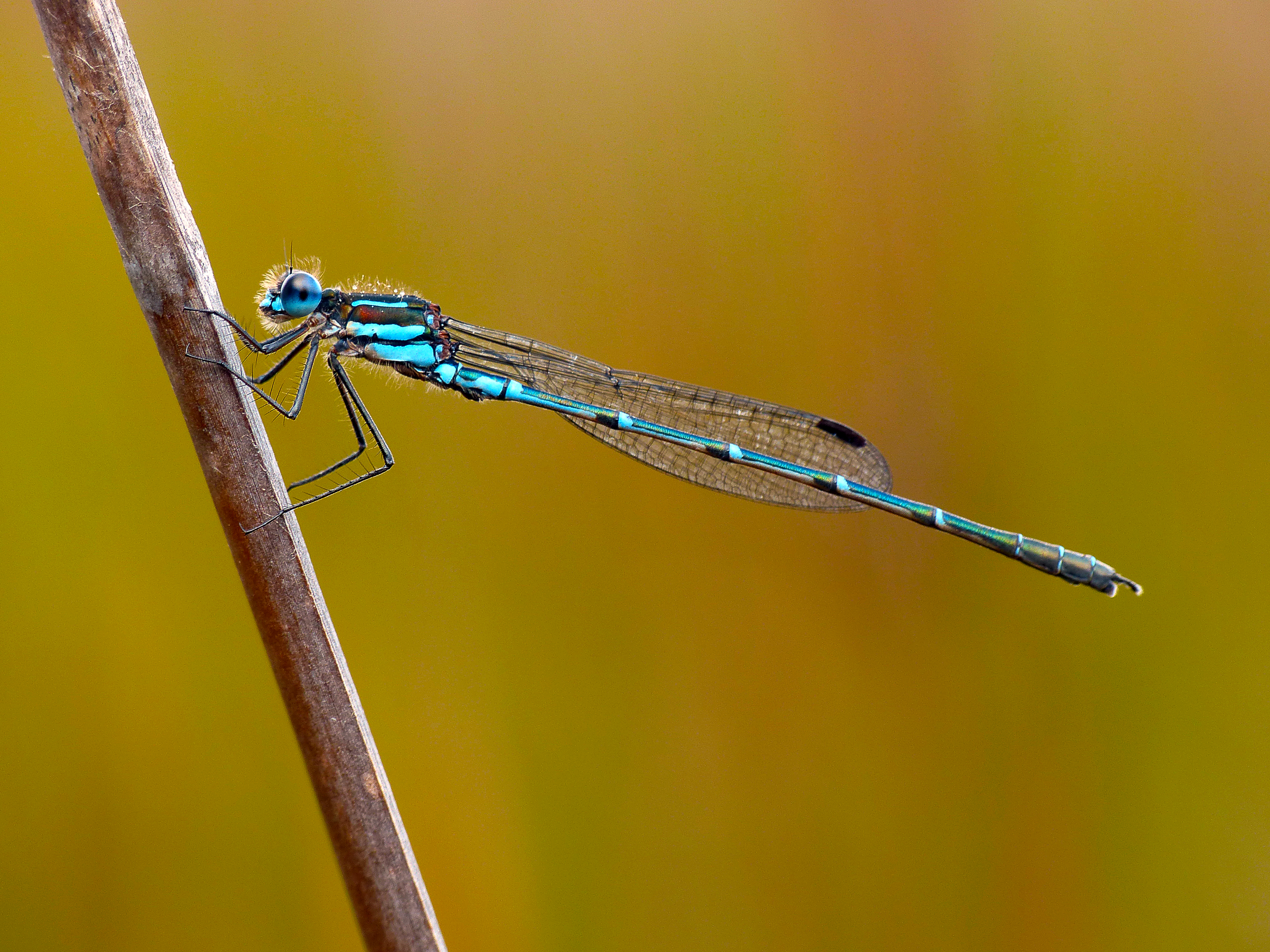
- Male

Conservation status
- Least Concern (IUCN 3.1)

Scientific classification
- Kingdom: Animalia
- Phylum: Arthropoda
- Clade: Pancrustacea
- Class: Insecta
- Order: Odonata
- Suborder: Zygoptera
- Family: Lestidae
- Genus: Austrolestes
- Species: A. psyche

Binomial name
- Austrolestes psyche (Hagen, 1862)

Synonyms
- Lestes psyche Hagen, 1862

= Austrolestes psyche =

Cup ringtail

Species of damselfly

Austrolestes psyche is an Australian species of damselfly in the family Lestidae, commonly known as a cup ringtail. It is found in south-eastern Australia where it inhabits pools, lakes and swamps.

Austrolestes psyche is a medium-sized to large damselfly, the male is light blue and black.

== Etymology ==
The genus name Austrolestes combines the prefix austro- (from Latin auster, meaning “south wind”, hence “southern”) with Lestes, a genus name derived from Greek λῃστής (lēstēs, “robber”).

The species name psyche is named after Psyche, a figure from Greek mythology.

== Gallery ==
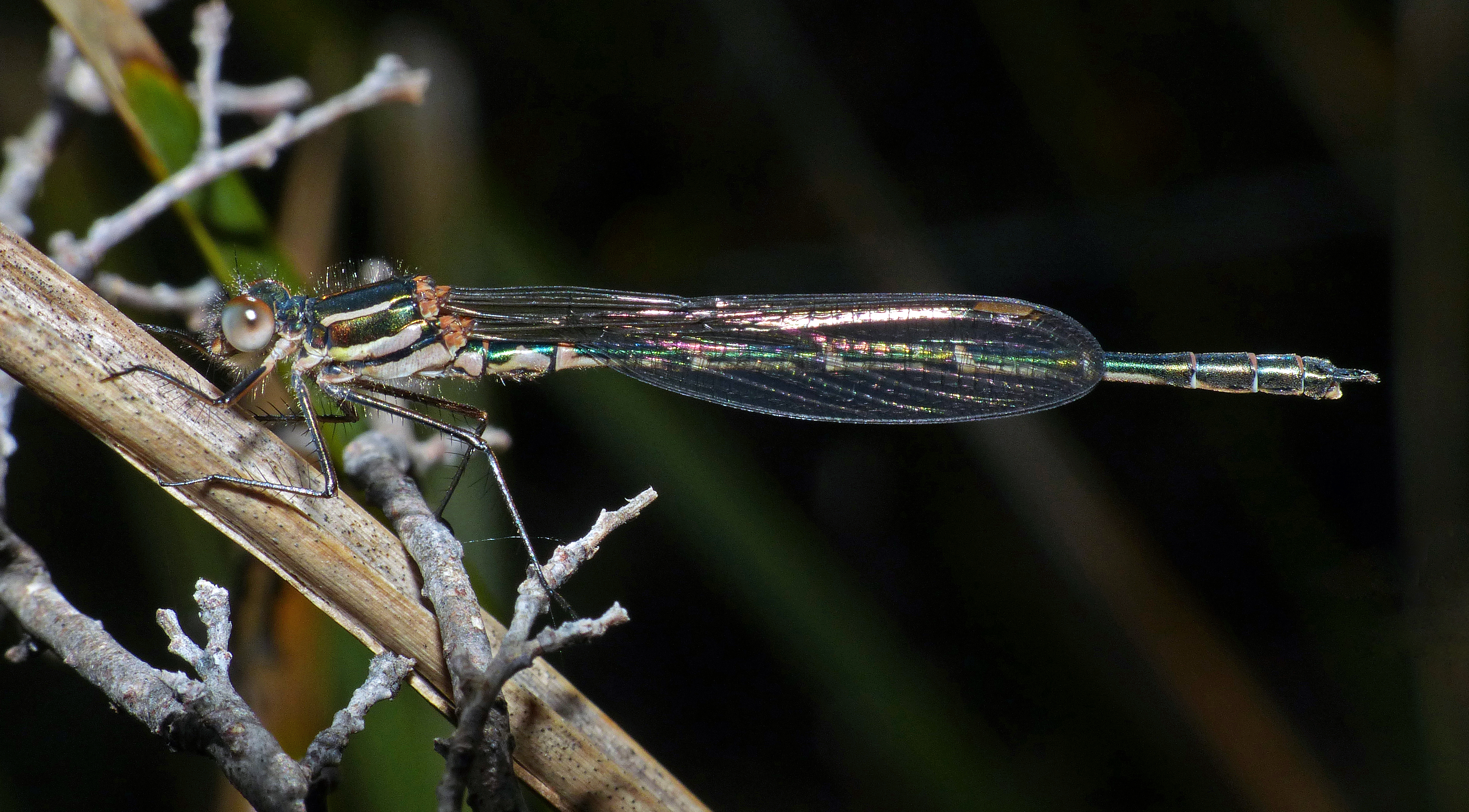
Young adult male

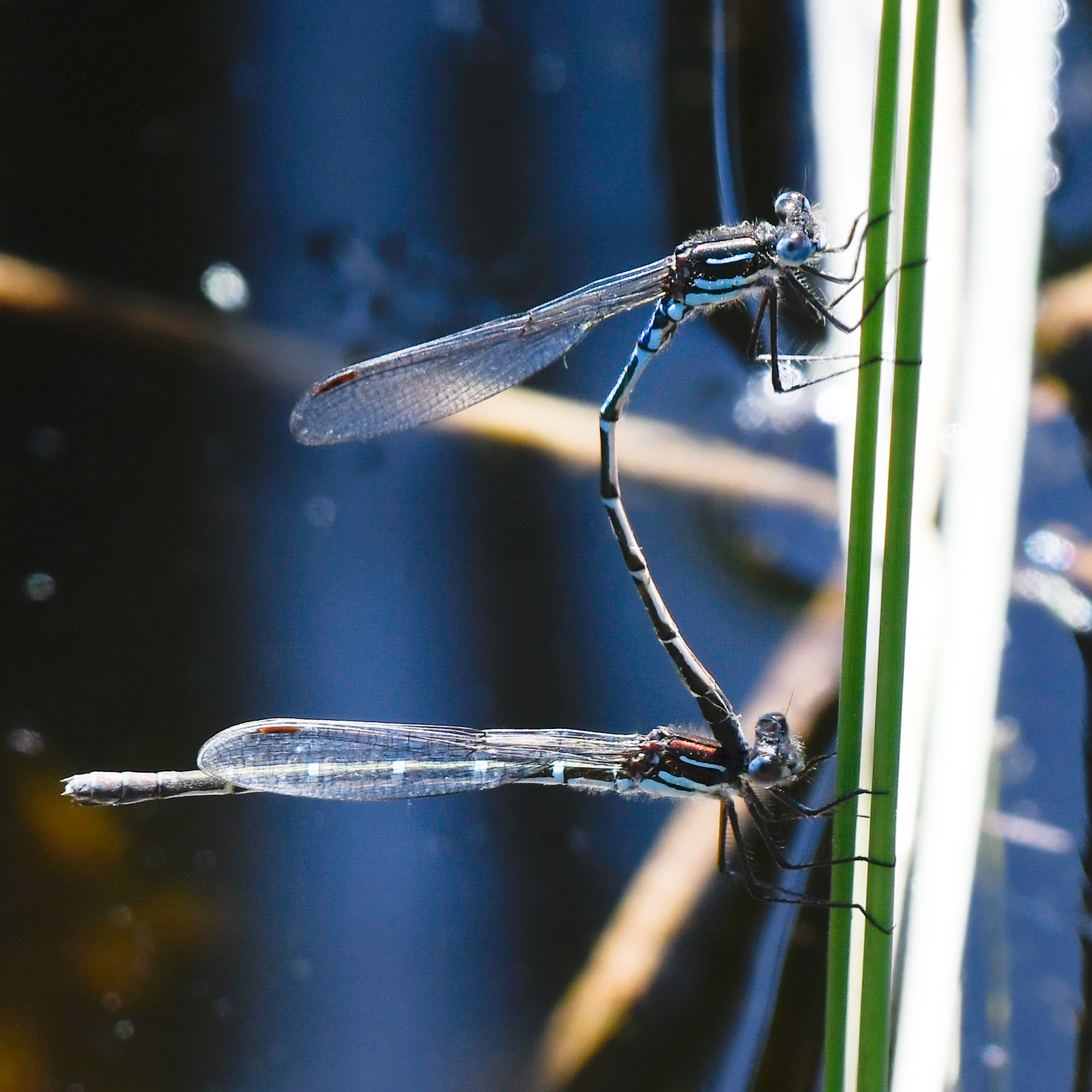
Mating pair

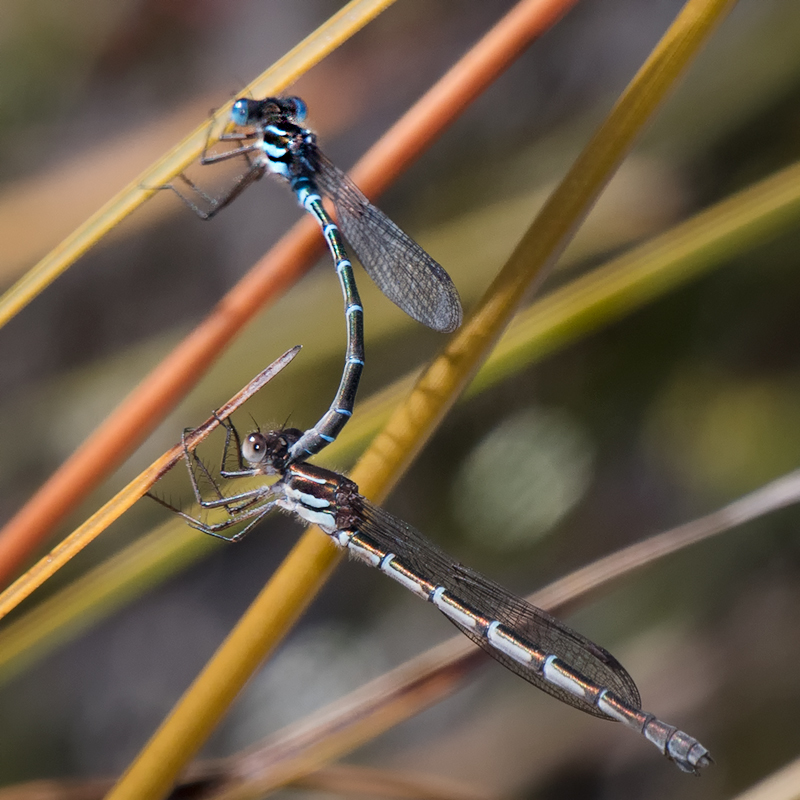
Mating pair from behind

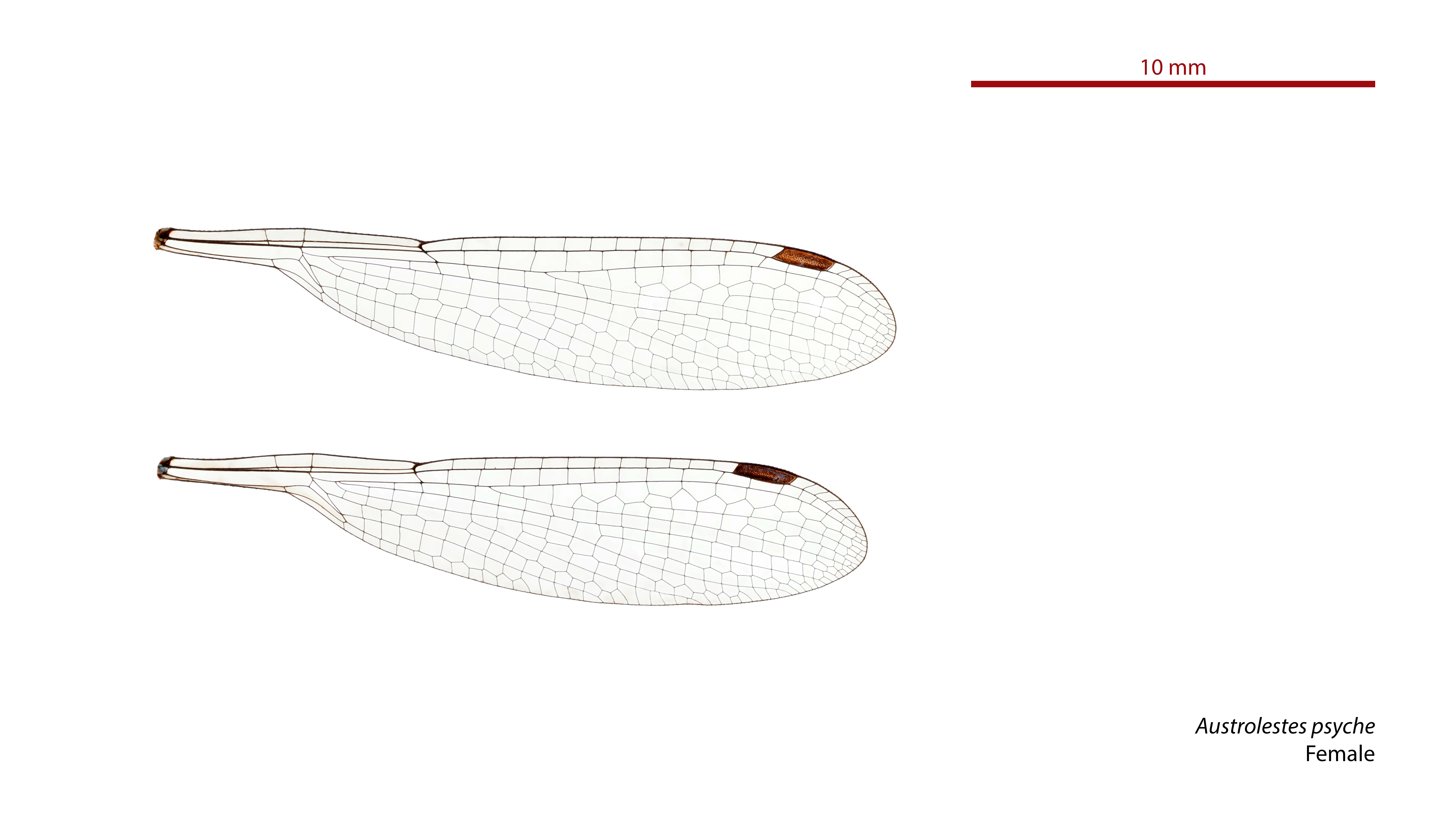
Female wings

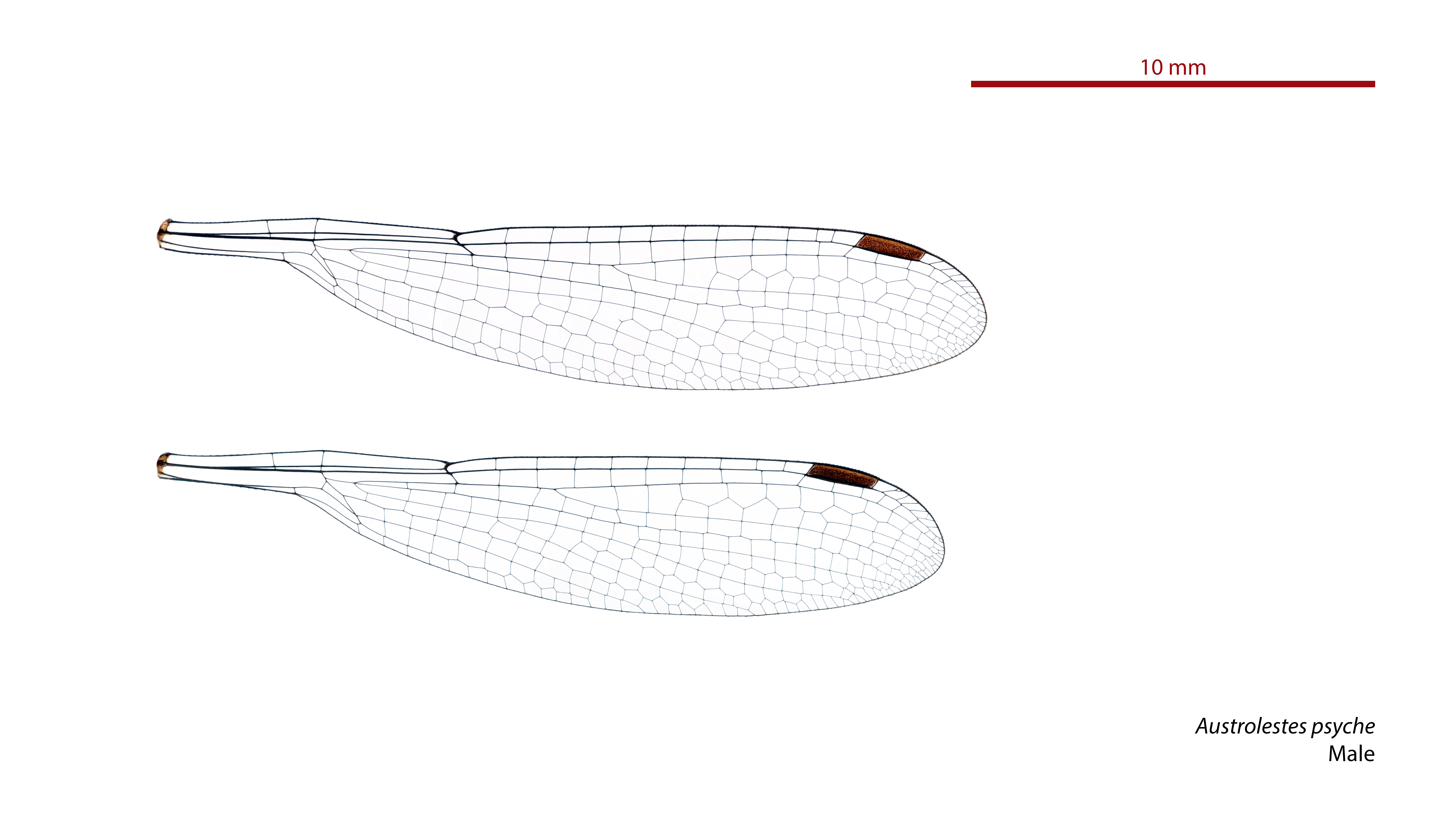
Male wings

== See also ==
- List of Odonata species of Australia
