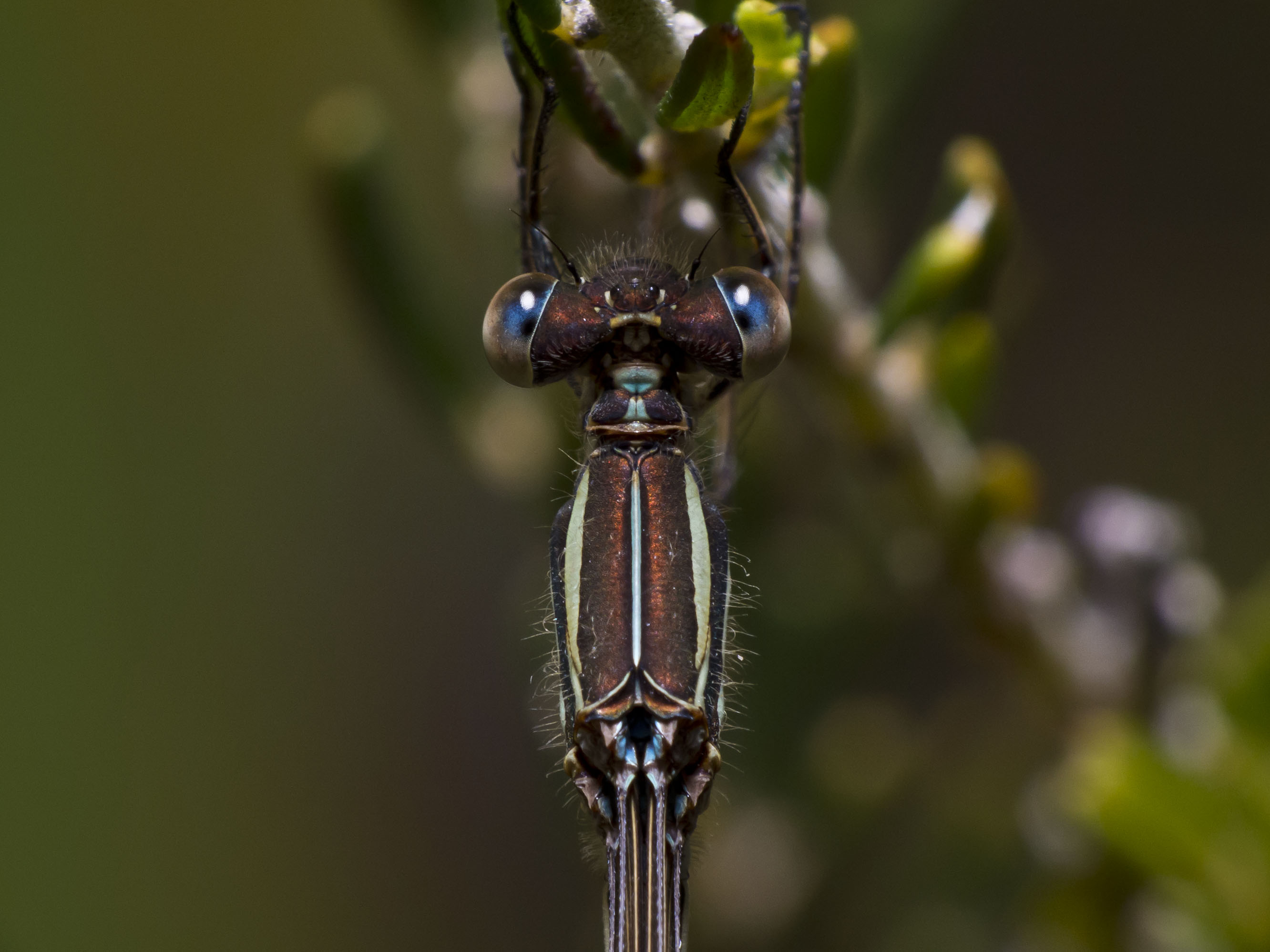
- Female slender ringtail

Conservation status
- Least Concern (IUCN 3.1)

Scientific classification
- Kingdom: Animalia
- Phylum: Arthropoda
- Clade: Pancrustacea
- Class: Insecta
- Order: Odonata
- Suborder: Zygoptera
- Family: Lestidae
- Genus: Austrolestes
- Species: A. analis

Binomial name
- Austrolestes analis (Rambur, 1842)

Synonyms
- Lestes analis Rambur, 1842

= Slender ringtail =

Species of damselfly

The slender ringtail (Austrolestes analis) is an Australian damselfly in the family Lestidae. It is characterized by having a relatively slender body compared to other species in the genus.

== Taxonomy ==
The slender ringtail was first described by Jules Pierre Rambur in 1862.

== Description ==
The abdomen is 3-3.2 cm long. Mature males are often pale blue and black although the strength of the blue may vary. Distinguished from other Austrolestes by the pattern on the upper thorax, most closely resembling that of Austrolestes aridus.

== Distribution and habitat ==
It is found in south-western Western Australia, south-eastern South Australia, Victoria, New South Wales and Tasmania.

It is active through Spring to Autumn near lakes, slow flowing rivers and nearby vegetation.

== Etymology ==
The genus name Austrolestes combines the prefix austro- (from Latin auster, meaning “south wind”, hence “southern”) with Lestes, a genus name derived from Greek λῃστής (lēstēs, “robber”).

The species name analis is Latin for "of the anus", likely referring to features of the anal region.

== Gallery ==
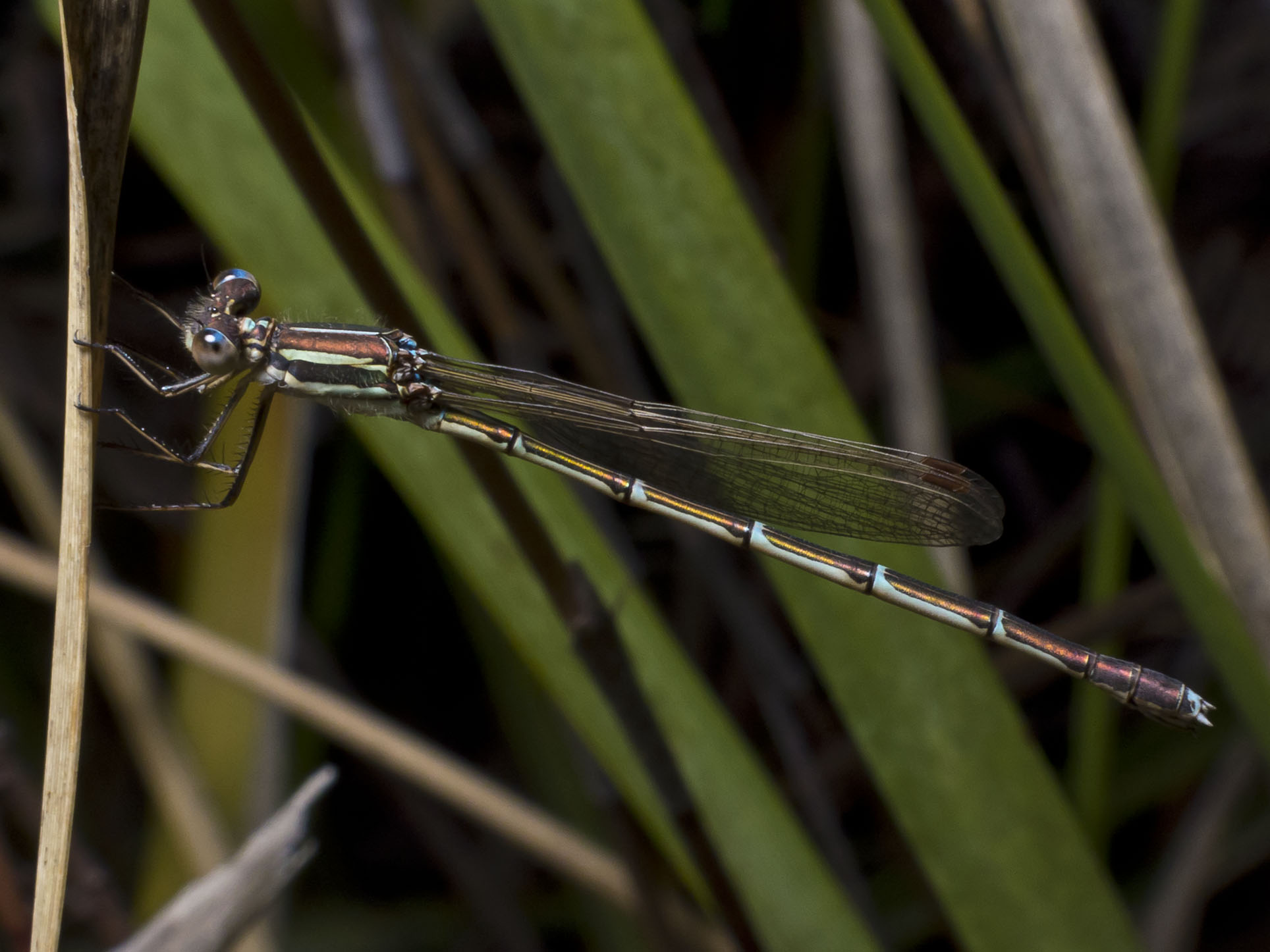
Female, Tasmania, Australia

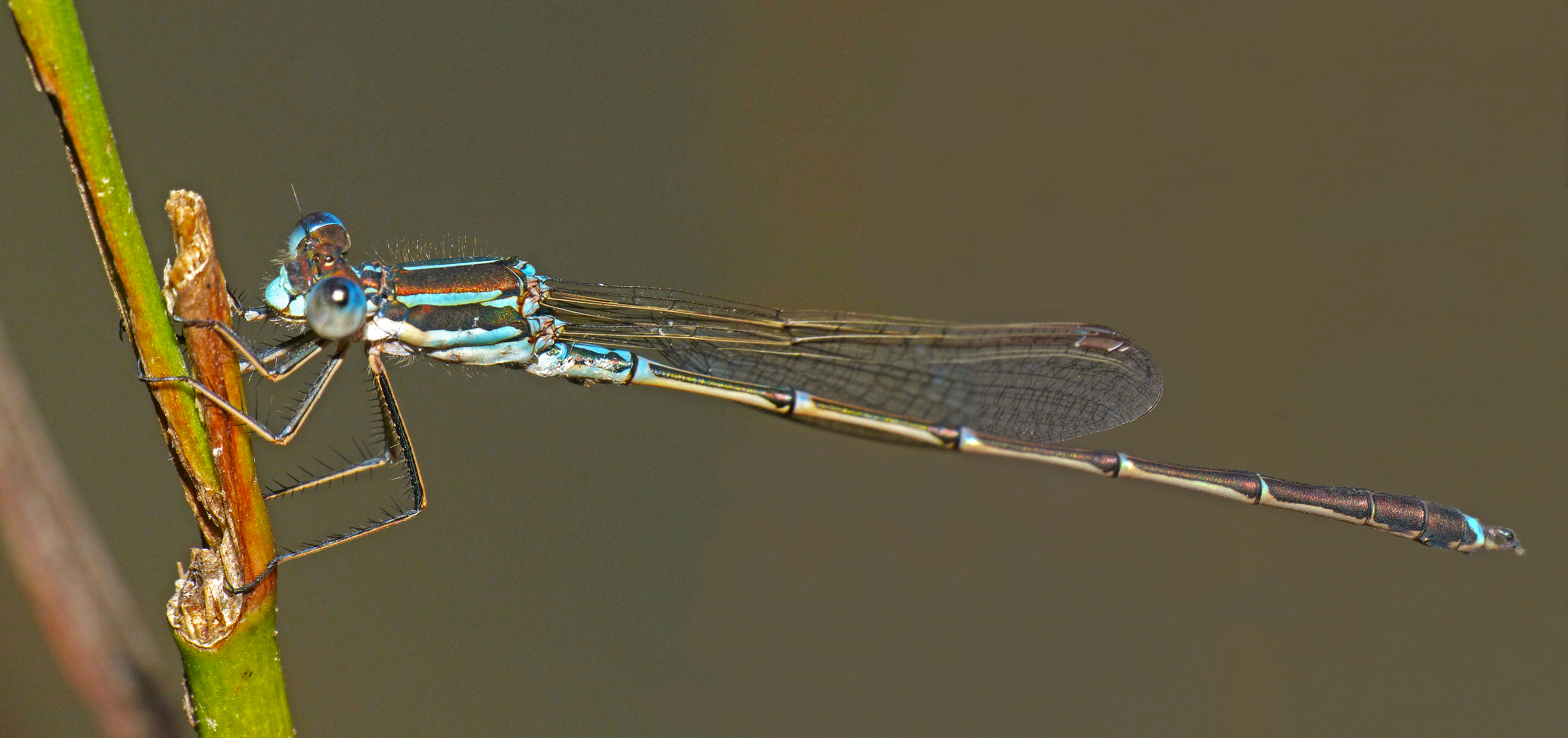
Male, Tasmania, Australia

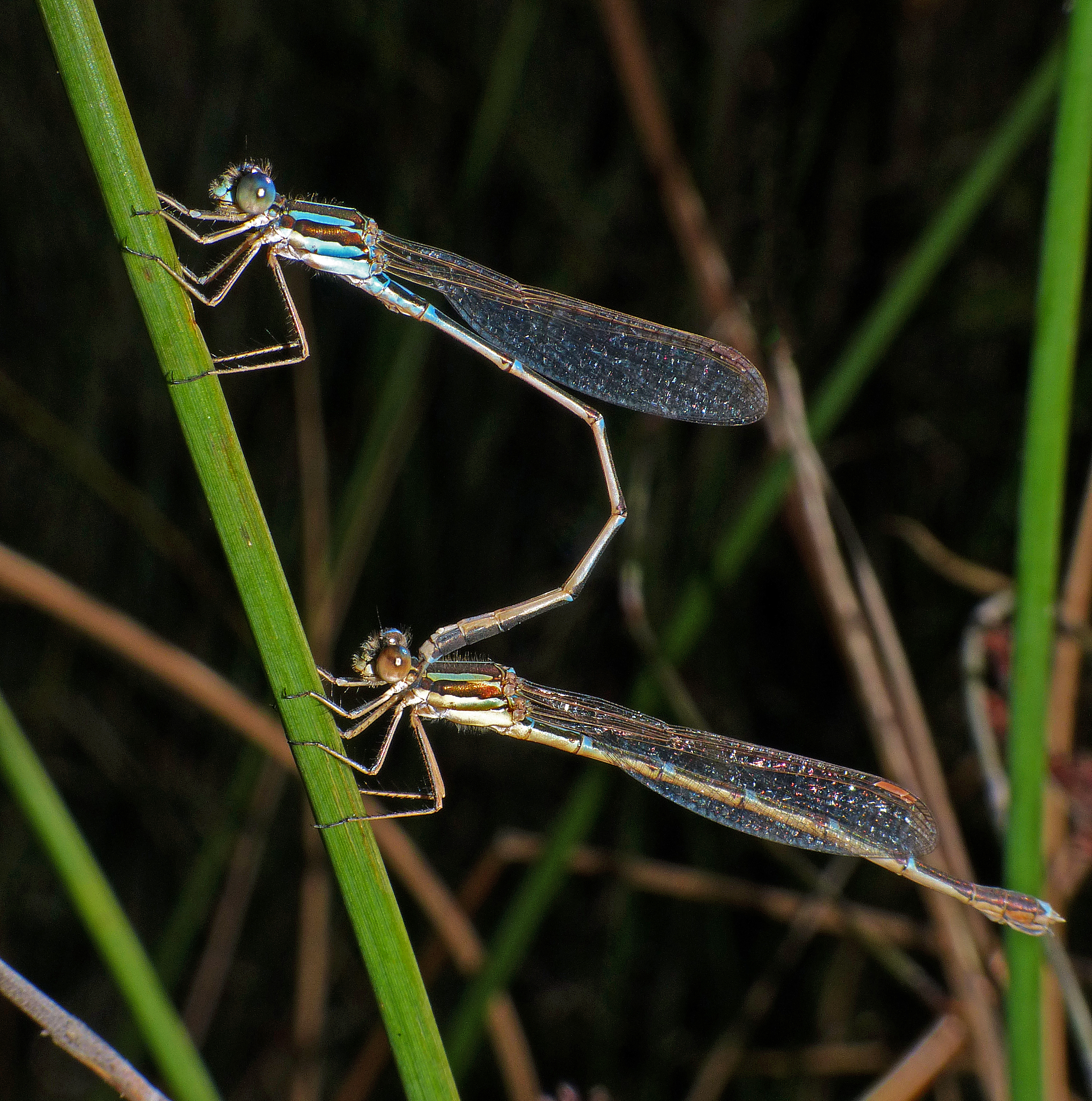
Mating

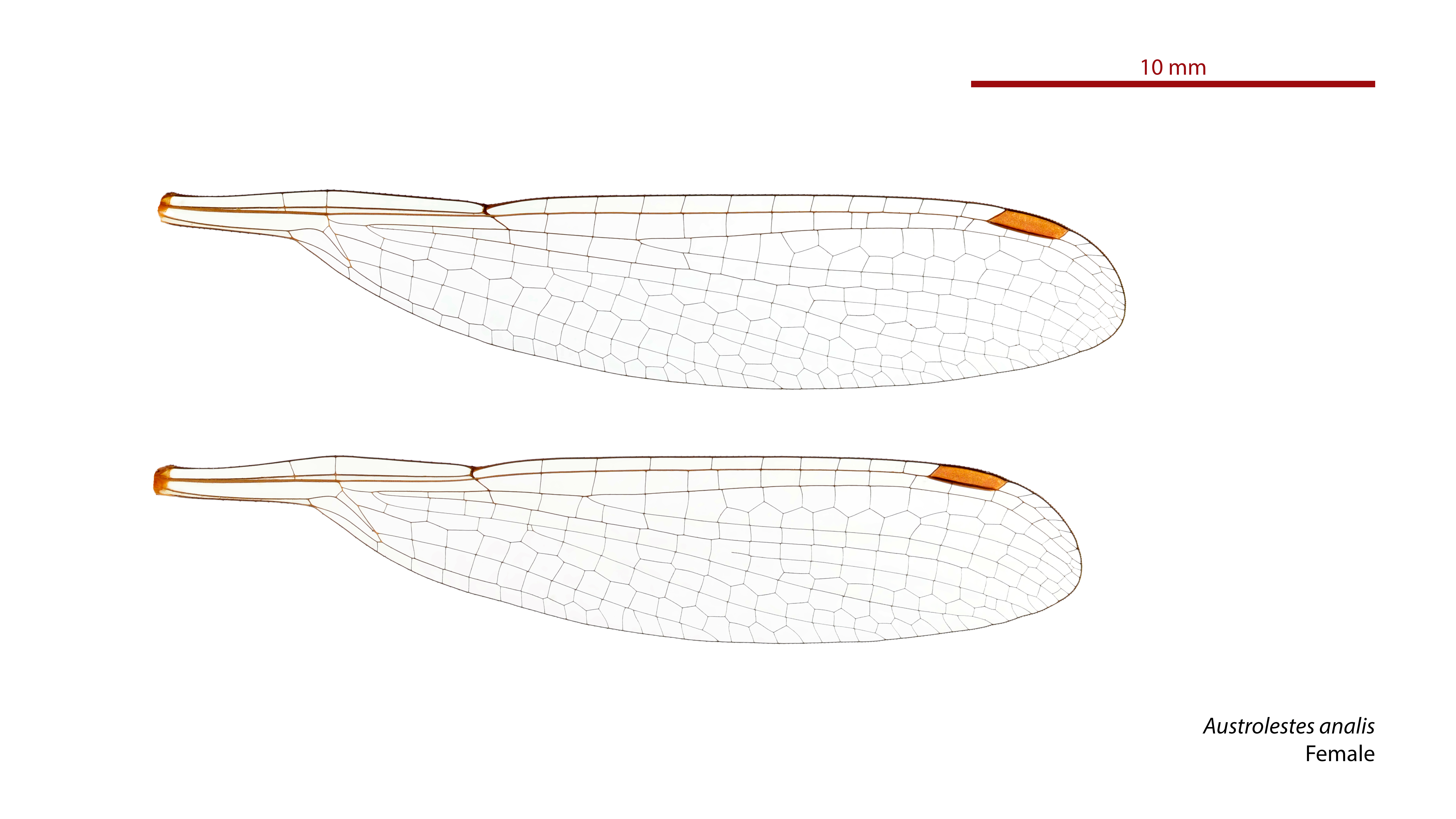
Female wings

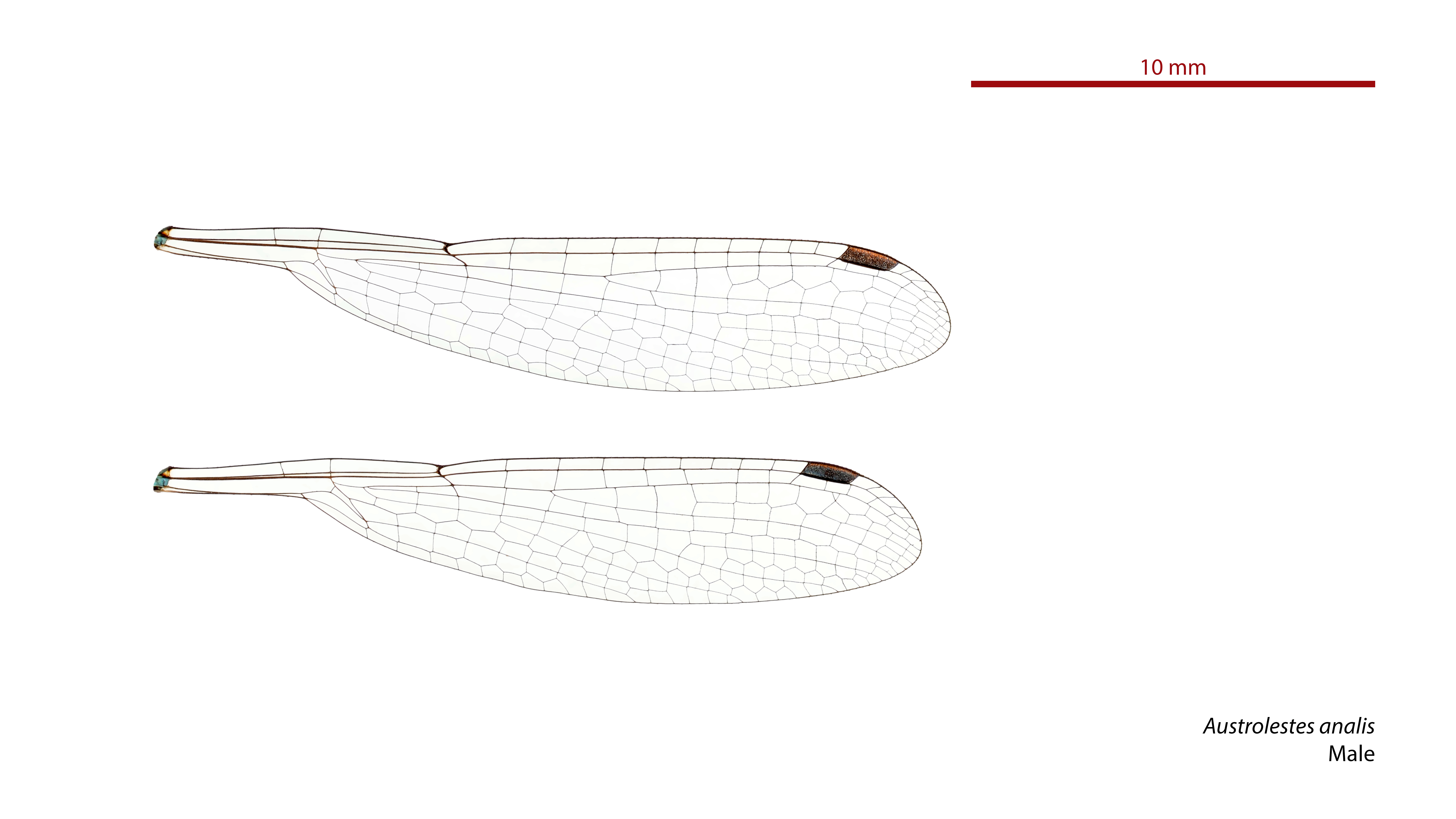
Male wings
