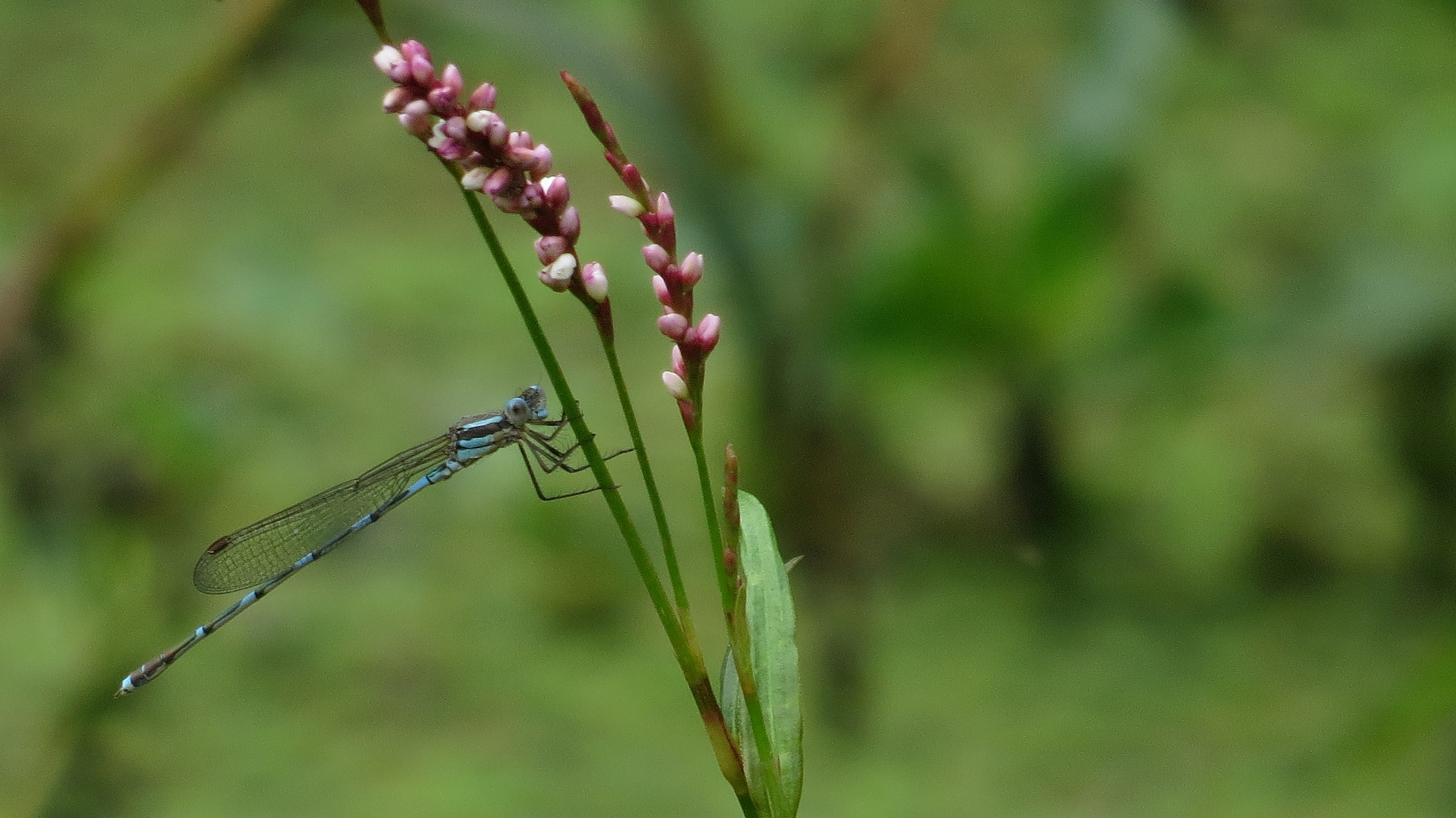
- Male
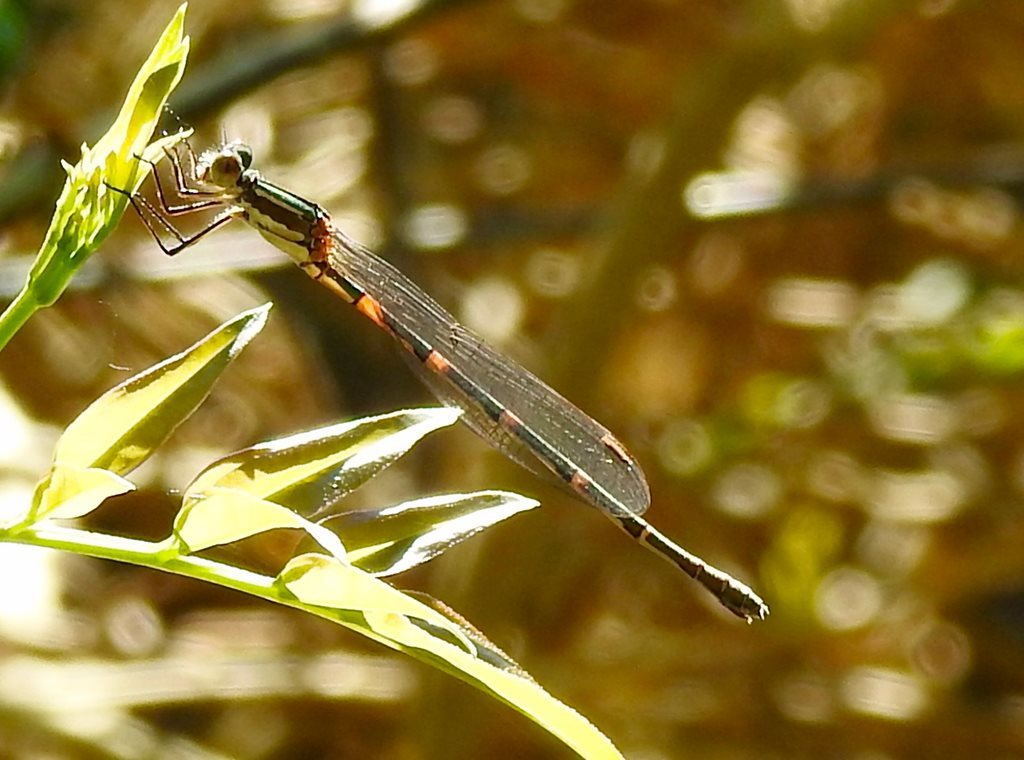
- Female

Conservation status
- Least Concern (IUCN 3.1)

Scientific classification
- Kingdom: Animalia
- Phylum: Arthropoda
- Clade: Pancrustacea
- Class: Insecta
- Order: Odonata
- Suborder: Zygoptera
- Family: Lestidae
- Genus: Austrolestes
- Species: A. leda

Binomial name
- Austrolestes leda (Selys, 1862)

Synonyms
- Lestes leda Selys, 1862

= Austrolestes leda =

Wandering ringtail

Species of damselfly

Austrolestes leda is an Australian species of damselfly in the family Lestidae, commonly known as a wandering ringtail. It is found across eastern Australia where it inhabits slow and still water.

Austrolestes leda is a medium-sized to large damselfly, the male is light blue and black.

== Etymology ==
The genus name Austrolestes combines the prefix austro- (from Latin auster, meaning “south wind”, hence “southern”) with Lestes, a genus name derived from Greek λῃστής (lēstēs, “robber”).

The species name leda is named after Leda, a figure from Greek mythology.

== Gallery ==
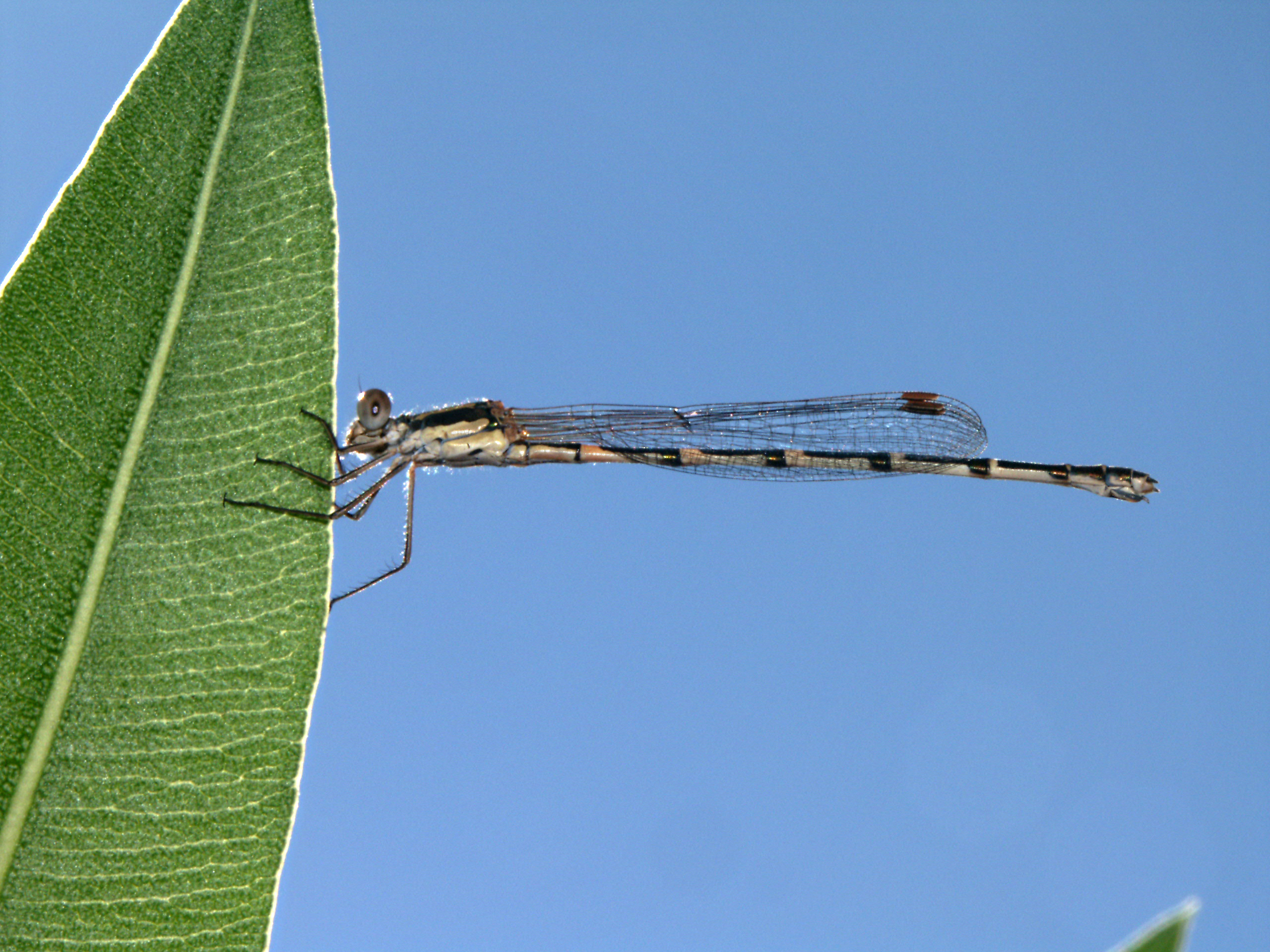
Female

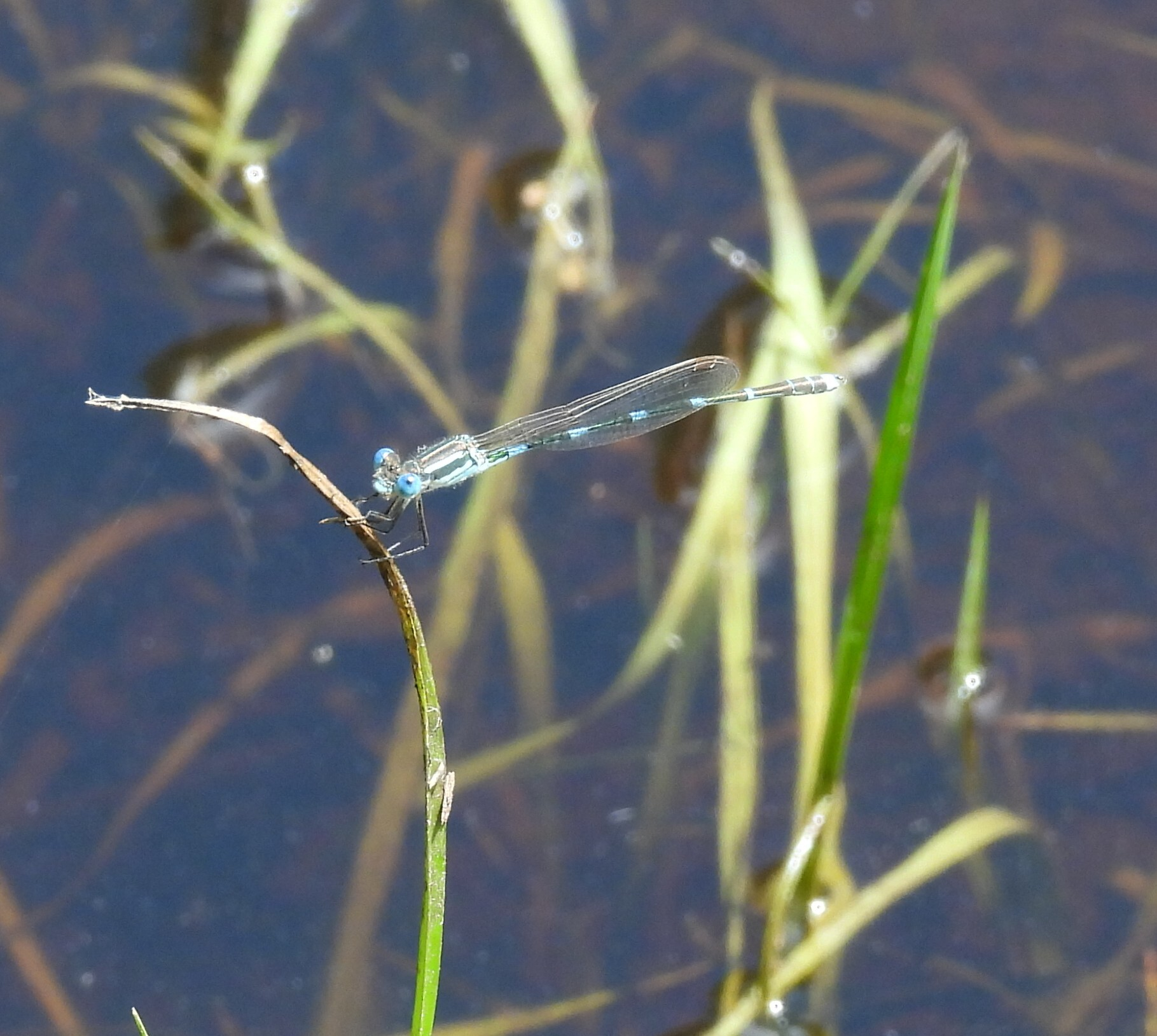
Male

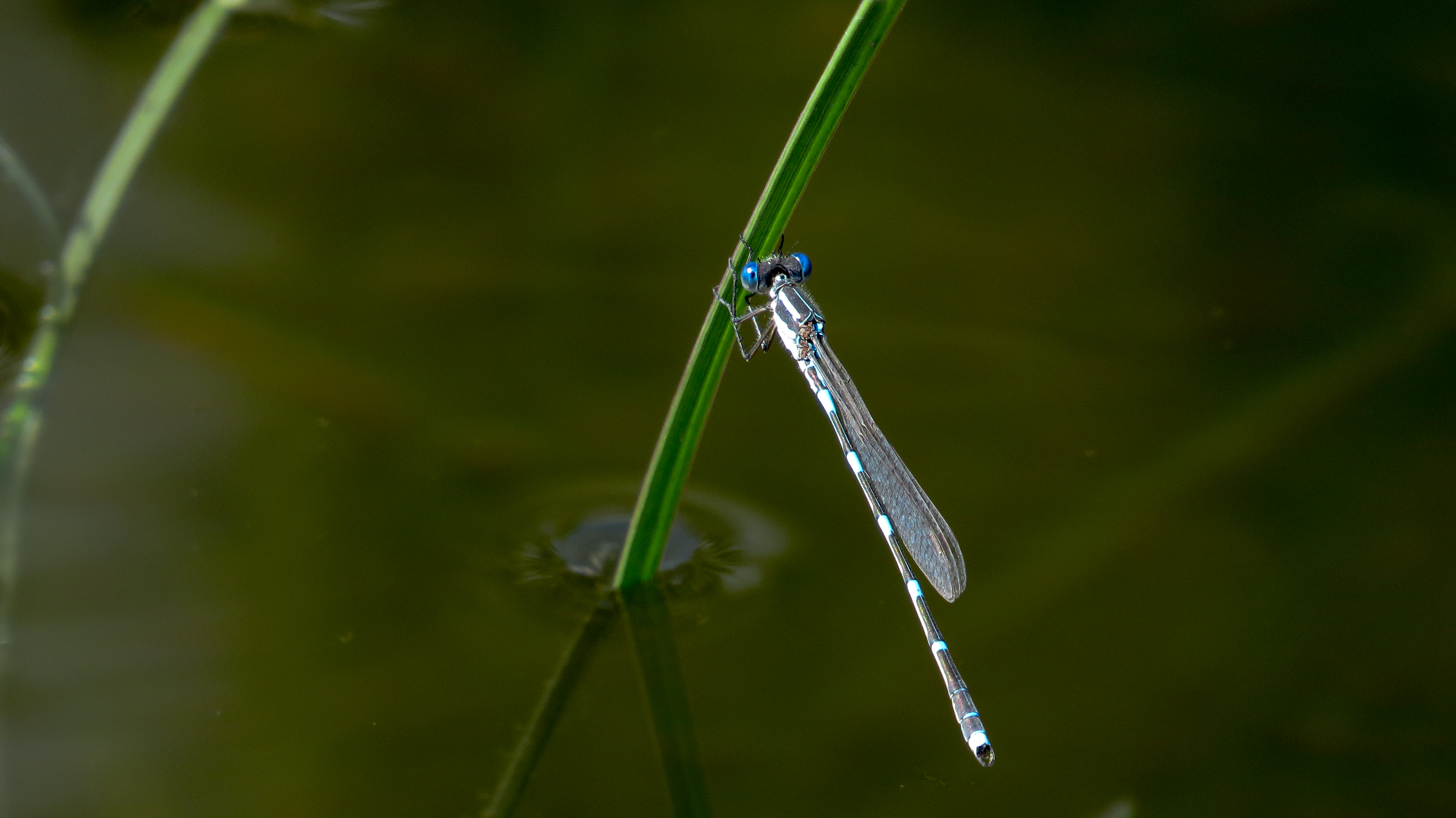
Male

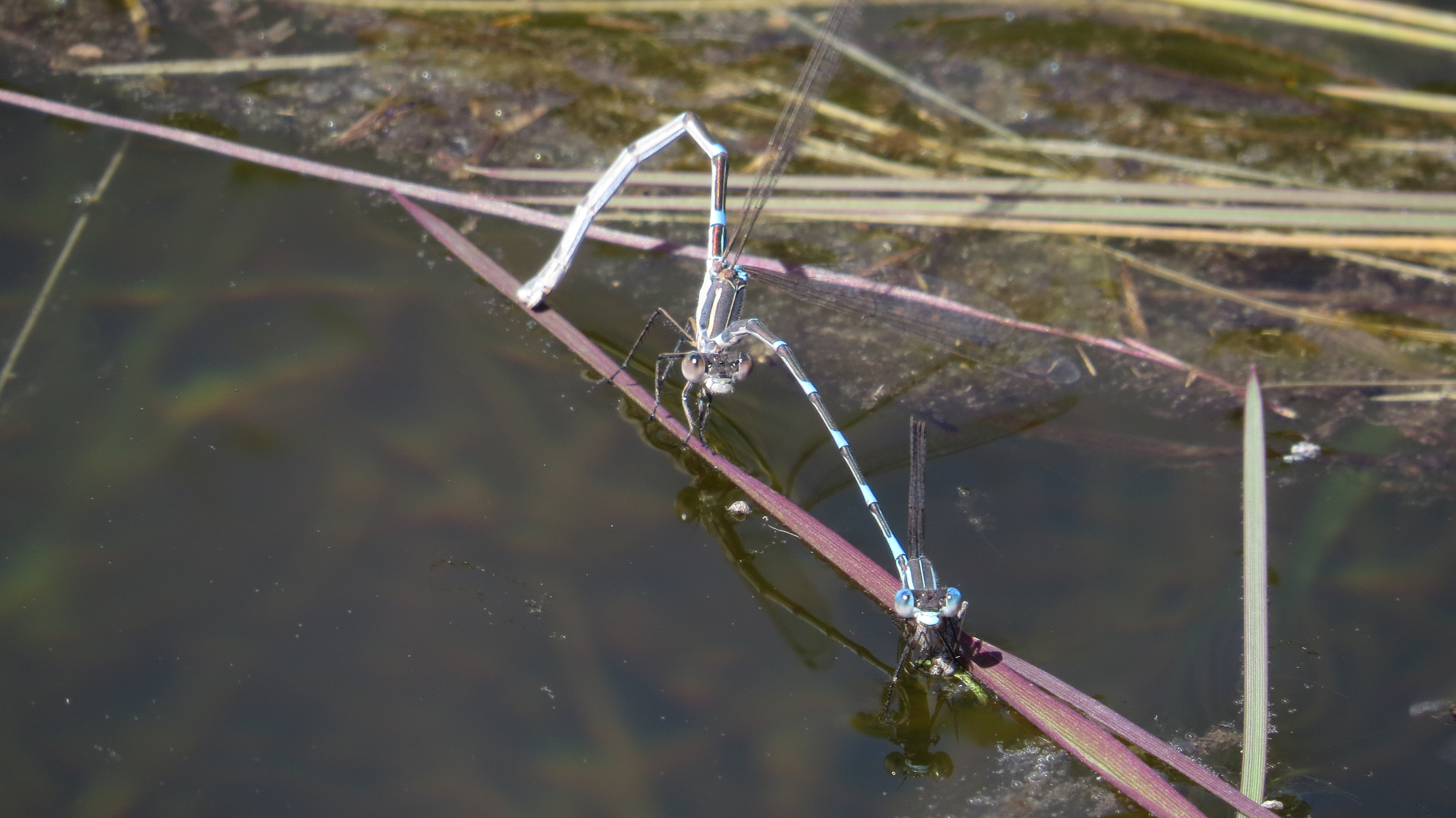
Male holding the neck of a female while she lays her eggs

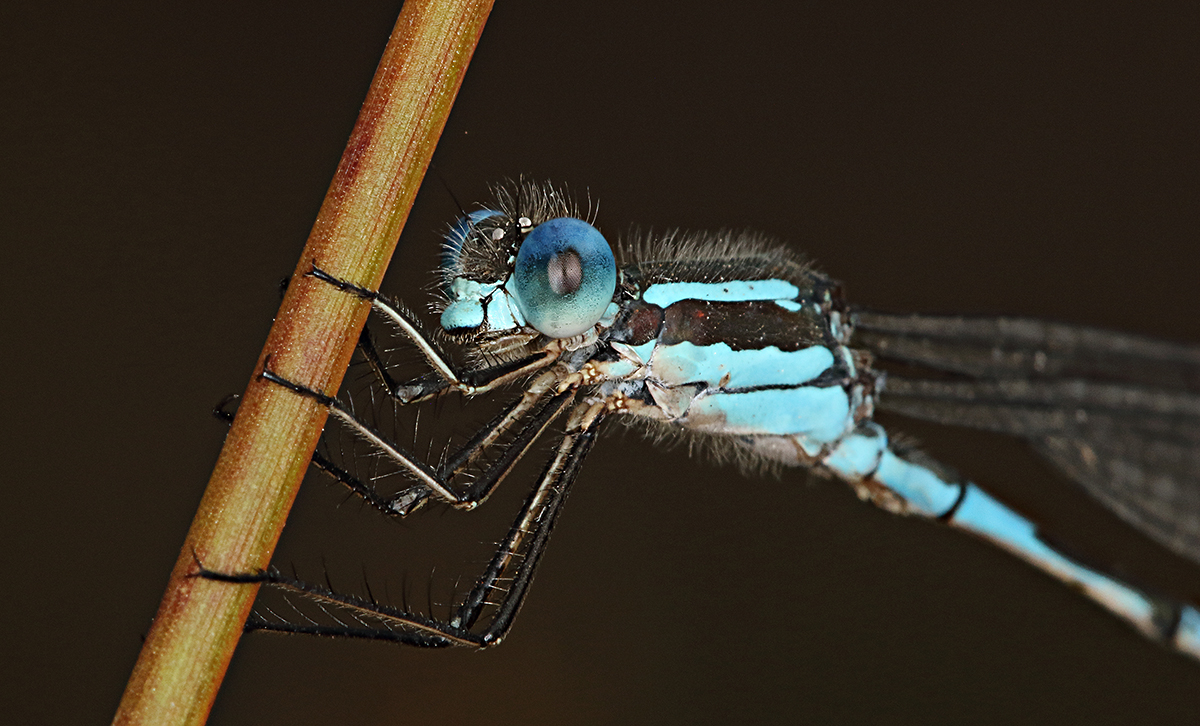
Face

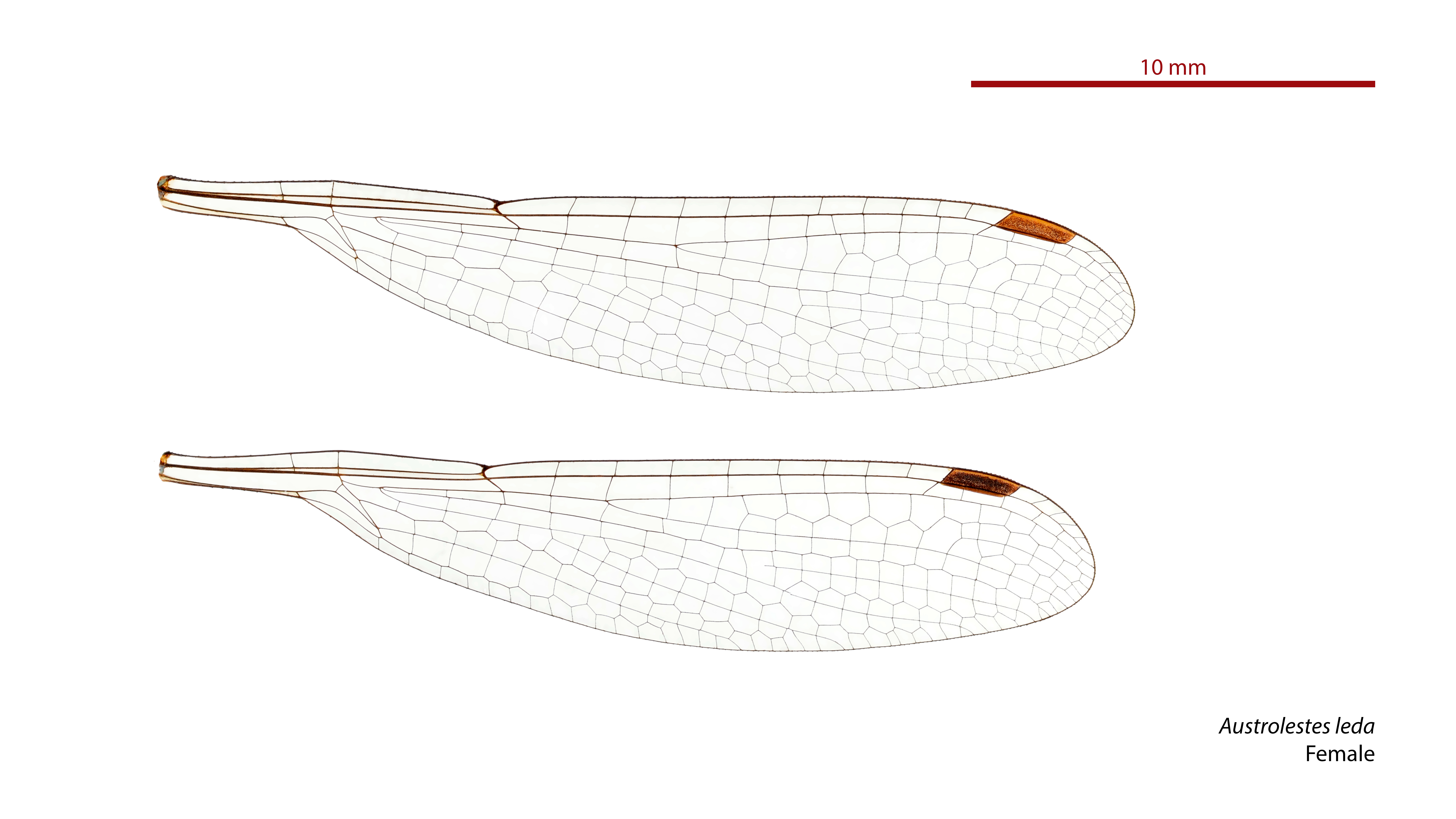
Female wings

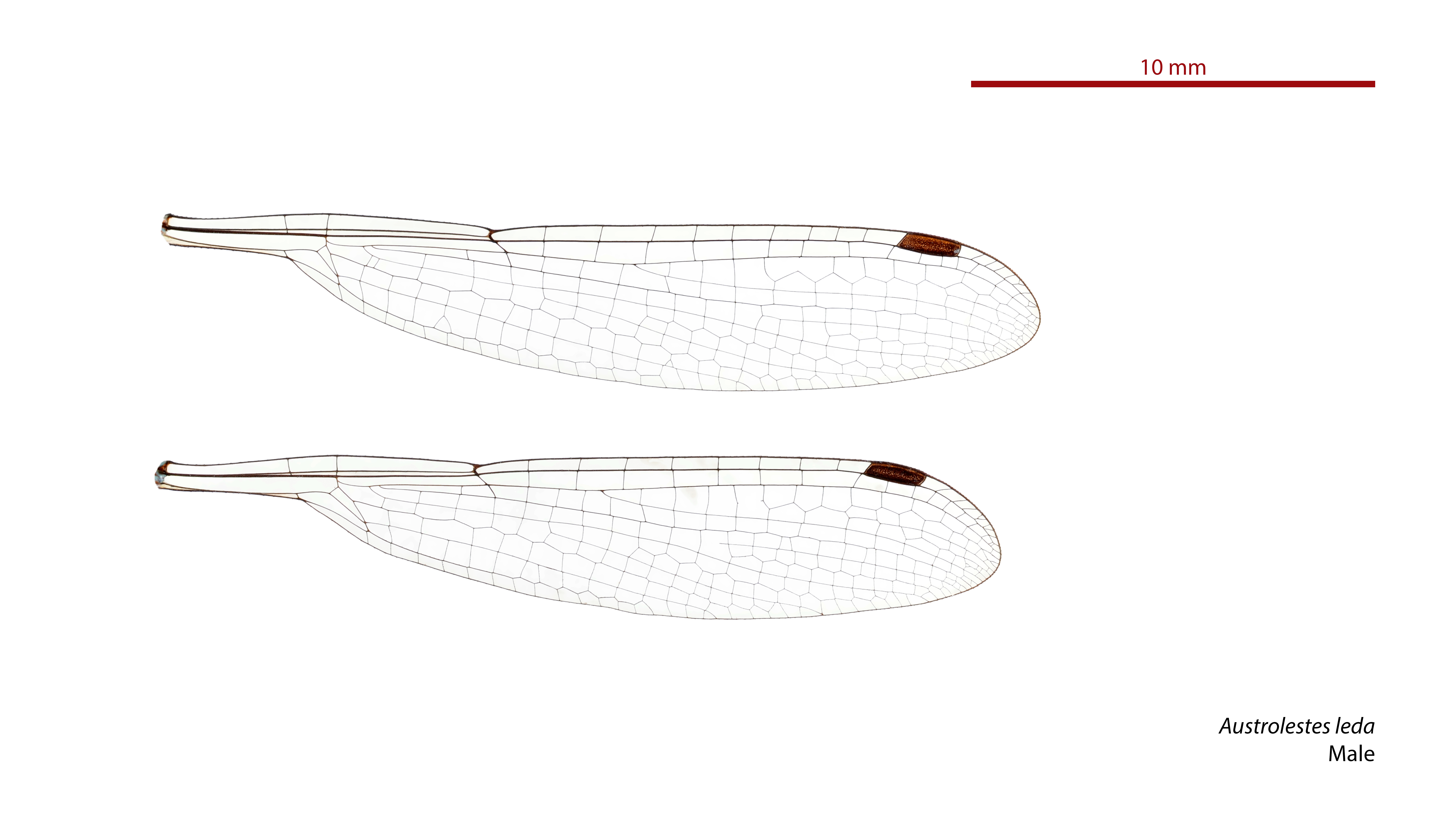
Male wings

== See also ==
- List of Odonata species of Australia
