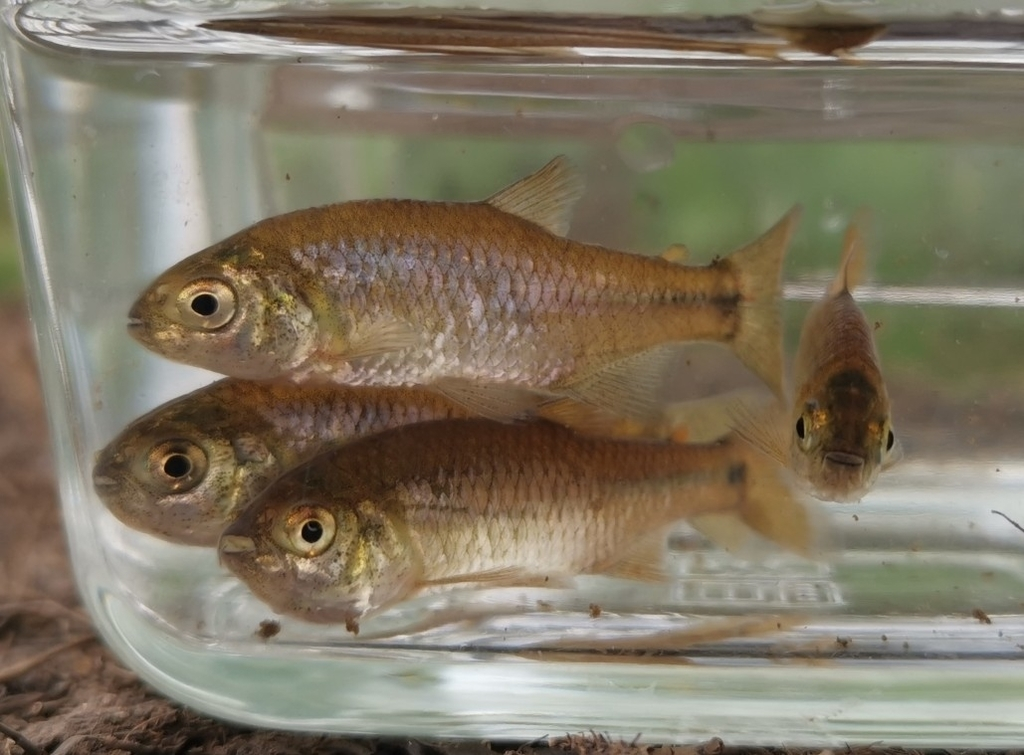

Conservation status
- Vulnerable (IUCN 3.1)

Scientific classification
- Kingdom: Animalia
- Phylum: Chordata
- Class: Actinopterygii
- Order: Characiformes
- Family: Characidae
- Genus: Cheirodon
- Species: C. australis

Binomial name
- Cheirodon australis C. H. Eigenmann, 1928

= Cheirodon australis =

Species of fish

Cheirodon australis is a species of freshwater ray-finned fish, a characin, belonging to the family Characidae. This fish is found in southern Chile.

== Taxonomy ==
Cheirodon australis was first formally described in 1928 by the German-born American ichthyologist Carl H. Eigenmann, with its type locality given as Puerto Varas in Chile. The genus Cheirodon is classified in the subfamily Cheirodontinae, which is classified within the family Characidae in the order Characiformes.

== Etymology ==
Cheirodon australis is classified in the genus Cheirodon, a name which is a combination of the Greek cheír, which means "hand", and odon, meaning "tooth". This refers to the teeth of the type species of the genus, C. pisciculus, which are dilated at their tips with at least five subconoical points on each tooth, with the middle point being longer than the others, showing a resemblance to a hand. The specific name, australis, means "of the south", as this was thought to be the most southerly species in the Characidae, although this is actually the naked characin (Gymnocharacinus bergi).

== Description ==
Cheirodon australis has a maximum total length of 6.5 cm (2.6 in). The anal fin has between 12 and 18 soft rays.

== Distribution and habitat ==
Cheirodon australis is endemic to Chile, where it occurs from the Valdivia Basin south to Chiloé Island between 39°S and 42°S. This is a common species in pools with a slow or almost no current, such as the backwaters of rivers and shoreline areas of lakes, where there are aquatic macrophytes. Only larger adults are found in areas with a swifter current.
