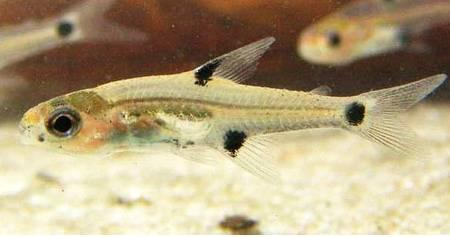

Conservation status
- Least Concern (IUCN 3.1)

Scientific classification
- Kingdom: Animalia
- Phylum: Chordata
- Class: Actinopterygii
- Order: Characiformes
- Family: Spintherobolidae
- Genus: Amazonspinther; Bührnheim, T. P. Carvalho, L. R. Malabarba & S. H. Weitzman, 2008
- Species: A. dalmata

Binomial name
- Amazonspinther dalmata Bührnheim, T. P. Carvalho, L. R. Malabarba & S. H. Weitzman, 2008

= Amazonspinther =

Monotypic genus of fishes

Amazonspinther is a monospecific genus of freshwater ray-finned fish belonging to the family Spintherobolidae, the piquiras. The only species in the genus is Amazonspinther dalmata, a species which is known only from the Purus and Madeira River basins in the Brazilian states of Amazonas and Rondônia.

== Taxonomy ==
Amazonspinther was first proposed as a genus in 2008 by the ichthyologists Cristina M. Bührnheim, Tiago P. Carvalho, Luiz R. Malabarba and Stanley Howard Weitzman when they described A. dalmata as a new species, giving its type locality as a stream crossing the Trans-Amazonian Highway, about 12 km (7.5 mi) west of Humaitá towards Lábrea, in the Madeira River basin at 7°34'25"S, 63°06'39"W in Amazonas. This taxon is classified within the family Spintherobolidae, alongside the four species in the genus Spintherobolus, although the species in that genus are found in the Atlantic coastal forests of eastern Brazil and this taxon is a found in the Amazon basin of western Brazil, suggesting a relict distribution of a previously more widespread family. The family Spintherobolidae was originally classified as a subfamily of the Characidae, Spintherobolinae, by Juan Marcos Mirande in 2008, but was elevated to family status in 2024. This family is classified in the suborder Characoidei of the order Characiformes.

== Etymology ==
Amazonspinther combines the word "Amazon", a reference to this species' occurrence in the Amazon basin, with spinther, meaning "spark. This is a reference to the yellow neuromasts on the head possessed by this taxon and by Spintherobolus. The specific name, dalmata, is the Portuguese word for the spotted colour coat pattern on Dalmatian dogs, which this fish is said to resemble.

== Description ==
Amazonspinther has an elongated body with a maximum standard length of 2 cm (0.79 in). It has 11 soft rays in both the dorsal and anal fins. There is a black blotch at the base of each of the dorsal, anal and caudal fin, a feature which sets this taxon apart from all other related species. This taxon has yellow cephalic neuromasts, a feature shared with Spintherobolus.

== Distribution and habitat ==
Amazonspinther is endemic to Brazil, where it occurs in small streams in the middle Purus River, and from the middle and lower Madeira River basins in the states of Amazonas and Rondônia. It is found in areas with a current, silt or mud bed, and thick aquatic vegetation in clear or turbid water.
