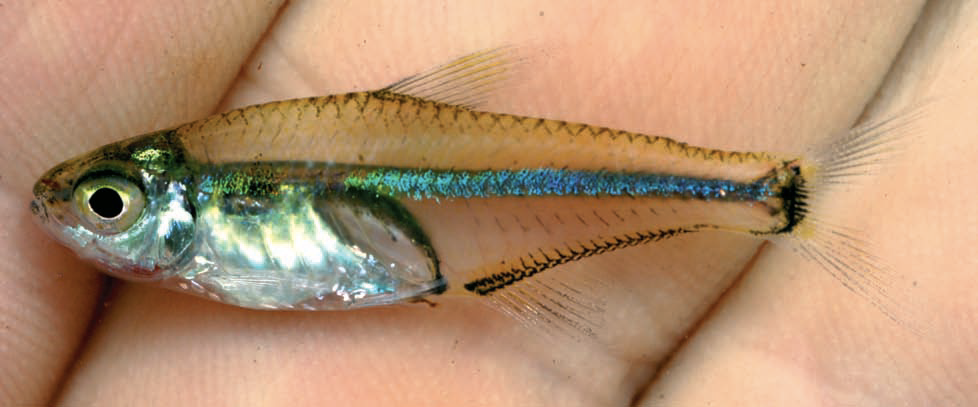
- Male
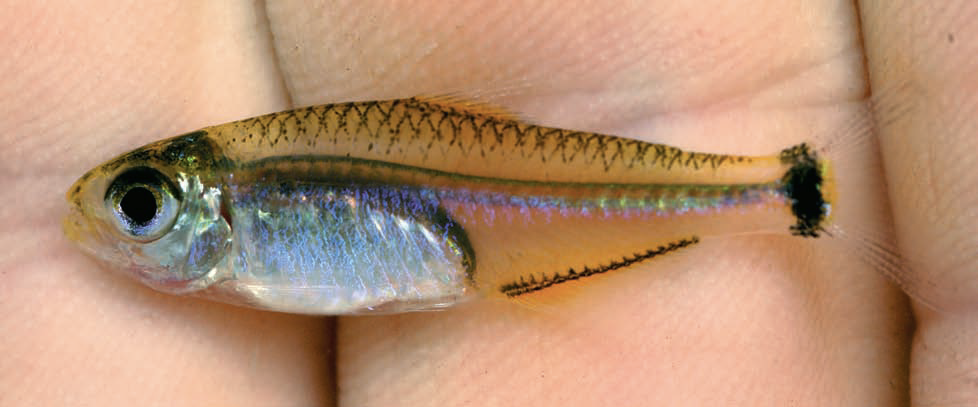
- Female

Conservation status
- Least Concern (IUCN 3.1)

Scientific classification
- Kingdom: Animalia
- Phylum: Chordata
- Class: Actinopterygii
- Order: Characiformes
- Family: Characidae
- Genus: Cyanogaster
- Species: C. geisleri

Binomial name
- Cyanogaster geisleri (Zarske & Géry, 2007)

Synonyms
- Hemigrammus geisleri Zarske & Géry, 2007

= Cyanogaster geisleri =

Species of fish

Cyanogaster geisleri is a species of freshwater ray-finned fish belonging to the family Characidae. This small, transparent fish is found in the Central Amazon, Brazil. It is classified within the glass characin subfamily Aphyocharacinae. It grows to a maximum size of 3.5 cm (1.4 in) and a weight of 0.46 g (0.016 oz). Ths species is found in the river systems of the Amazon and the Orinoco in Brazil, Colombia and Venezuela.

== Etymology ==
The specific name honours Dr. Rolf Geisler, aquarist and professor at the University of Freiburg, who collected the holotype and made it available for species description.
