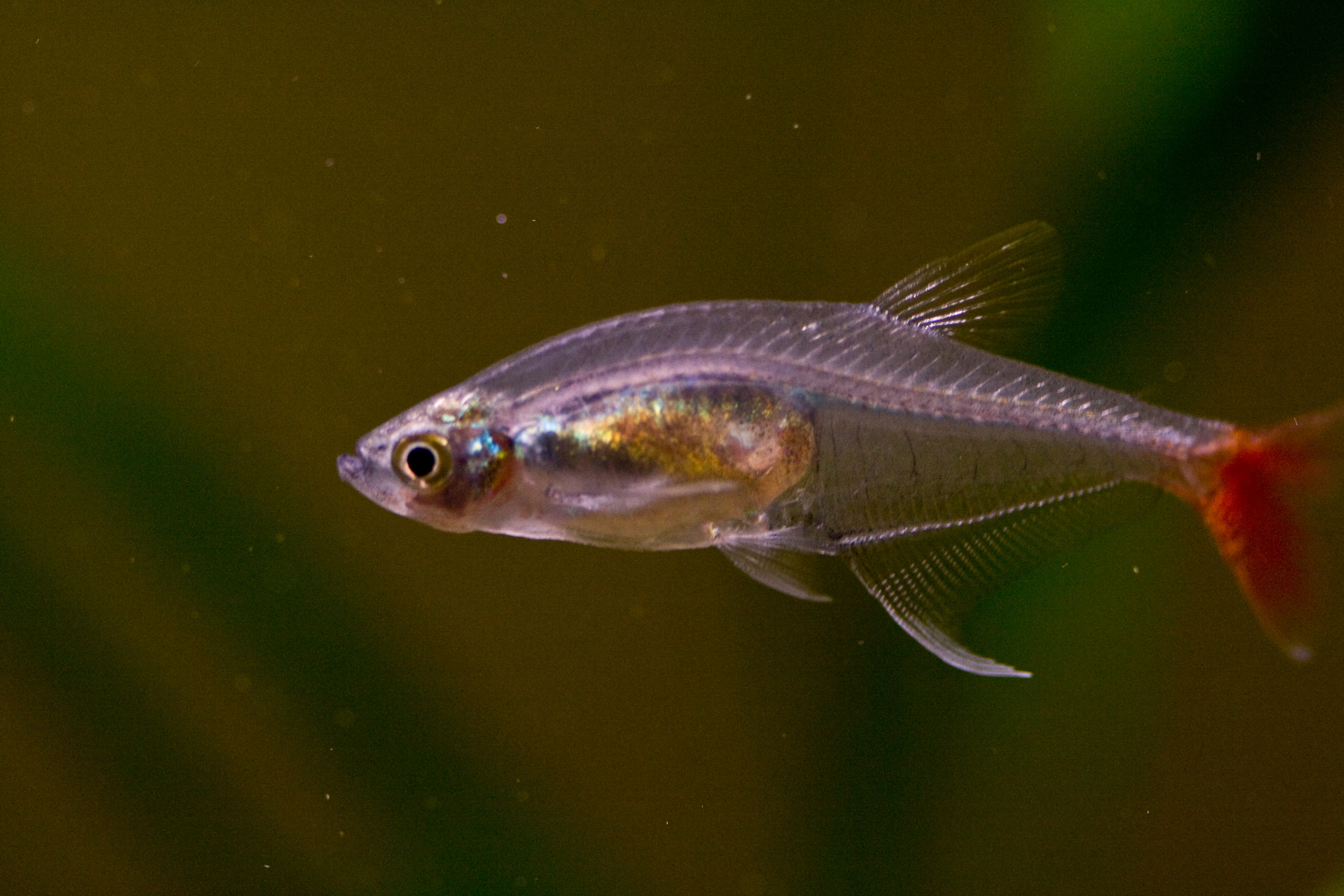

Conservation status
- Least Concern (IUCN 3.1)

Scientific classification
- Kingdom: Animalia
- Phylum: Chordata
- Class: Actinopterygii
- Order: Characiformes
- Family: Characidae
- Genus: Prionobrama
- Species: P. filigera

Binomial name
- Prionobrama filigera (Cope, 1870)

Synonyms
- Aphyocharax filigerus Cope, 1870; Prionobrama madeirae Fowler, 1913; Bleptonema amazonae C. H. Eigenmann, 1914; Aphyocharax analis Nichols, 1915

= Glass bloodfin tetra =

Species of fish

The glass bloodfin tetra (Prionobrama filigera) is a species of freshwater ray-finned fish, a characin, belonging to the family Characidae. This species is found in the Amazon basin of South America.

== Taxonomy ==
The glass bloodfin tetra was first formally described as Aphyocharax filigerus in 1870 by the American paleontologist, herpetologist and ichthyologist Edward Drinker Cope, with its type locality given as Pebas in Peru. In 1913 Henry Weed Fowler described Prionobrama madeirae, giving its type locality as a tributary of the Madeira River near Porto Velho, classifying this new species in the new genus Prionobrama. P. madeirae is now regarded as a synonym of this taxon, meaning that this taxon is the type species of the genus Prionobrama. The genus Prionobrama belongs to the subfamily Aphyocharacinae, the glass characins, which is part of the family Characidae within the suborder Characoidei of the order Characiformes.

== Etymology ==
The glass bloodfin tetra is the type species of the genus Prionobrama. This genus name compounds the Greek for a saw, príōn, an allusion to the row of teeth on the dentary, with brama, a reference to the European common bream (Abramis brama), which this fish was said to resemble. The specific name, filigera, means "thread bearing", a reference to the long, pointed anal fin.

== Description ==
The glass bloodfin tetra has a maximum total length of 6.0 cm (2.4 in). This species is similar to its only congener, P. paraguayensis, but that species does not have red in the caudal fin. It is distinguished from the similarly name bloodfin tetra (Aphyocharax anisitsi) by having a more elongate body and in not having red colour in the anal and pelvic fins.

== Distribution and habitat ==
The glass bloodfin tetra is found in the central and western Amazon basin in Bolivia, Brazil, Colombia, Ecuador and Peru. This species is found in floodplain lakes and in sandy shoals in whitewater rivers; here it prefers stands of aquatic macrophytes.

== Utilisation ==
The glass bloodfin tetra is found in the aquarium trade.
