= Glass tetra =

The Glass tetra is Bario oligolepis

It may also refer to:

- Glass bloodfin tetra (Prionobrama filigera)
- Heterocharax virgulatus (Blue flash glass tetra)
- Xenagoniates bondi (Long-finned glass tetra)
