= Cyanogaster noctivaga =

Conservation status
- Least Concern (IUCN 3.1)

Scientific classification
- Kingdom: Animalia
- Phylum: Chordata
- Class: Actinopterygii
- Order: Characiformes
- Family: Characidae
- Genus: Cyanogaster
- Species: C. noctivaga

Binomial name
- Cyanogaster noctivaga Mattox, Britz, Toledo-Piza & Marinho, 2013

Species of fish

Cyanogaster noctivaga is a species of freshwater ray-finned fish belonging to the family Characidae. This species is found in the Rio Negro, Brazil. Its scientific name translates as the blue-bellied night wanderer, referring to its unique appearance and nocturnal habits. It was first described in 2013, having been discovered in October 2011 on a scientific expedition organised by the University of São Paulo, Brazil.

== Taxonomy ==
Cyanogaster noctivaga was first formally described in 2013 by the Brazilian ichthyologists George Mendes Taliaferro Mattox, Ralf Britz, Mônica de Toledo-Piza Ragazzo and Manoela Maria Ferreira Marinho, with its type locality given as "Santa Isabel do Rio Negro, rock plateau along Rio Negro, near the mouth of Río Urubaxi, 0°35'05.3"S, 64°49'12.2"W, Amazonas". The genus Cyanogaster is classified within the subfamily Aphyocharacinae, the glass characins, which is part of the family Characidae within the suborder Characoidei of the order Characiformes.

== Description ==
When alive, Cyanogaster noctivaga is a transparent fish with a blue belly and reddish gill covers, but it quickly loses its bright colours after death. Its eyes are large, and the shape of its snout and its dentition differs from other characins, marking it out as a new genus. The longest specimen found was 17.4 mm (0.69 in) long. It differs from other members of the subfamily Stevardiinae in having 8 dorsal-fin rays and four teeth in the inner premaxillary tooth series, and i+5 pelvic-fin rays and the presence of a single conical tooth in the outer premaxillary tooth series. There are hooks on the rays of the pelvic and anal fins in mature males.

== Distribution and habitat ==
This fish is only known from a single location in the Rio Negro, but, as it is a very small fish and seems to be entirely nocturnal, it is easily overlooked. It was found in an acidic backwater, a similar habitat to that of the smallest known species of fish, Paedocypris progenetica, which occurs in peaty forest swamps and blackwater streams in Asia.
