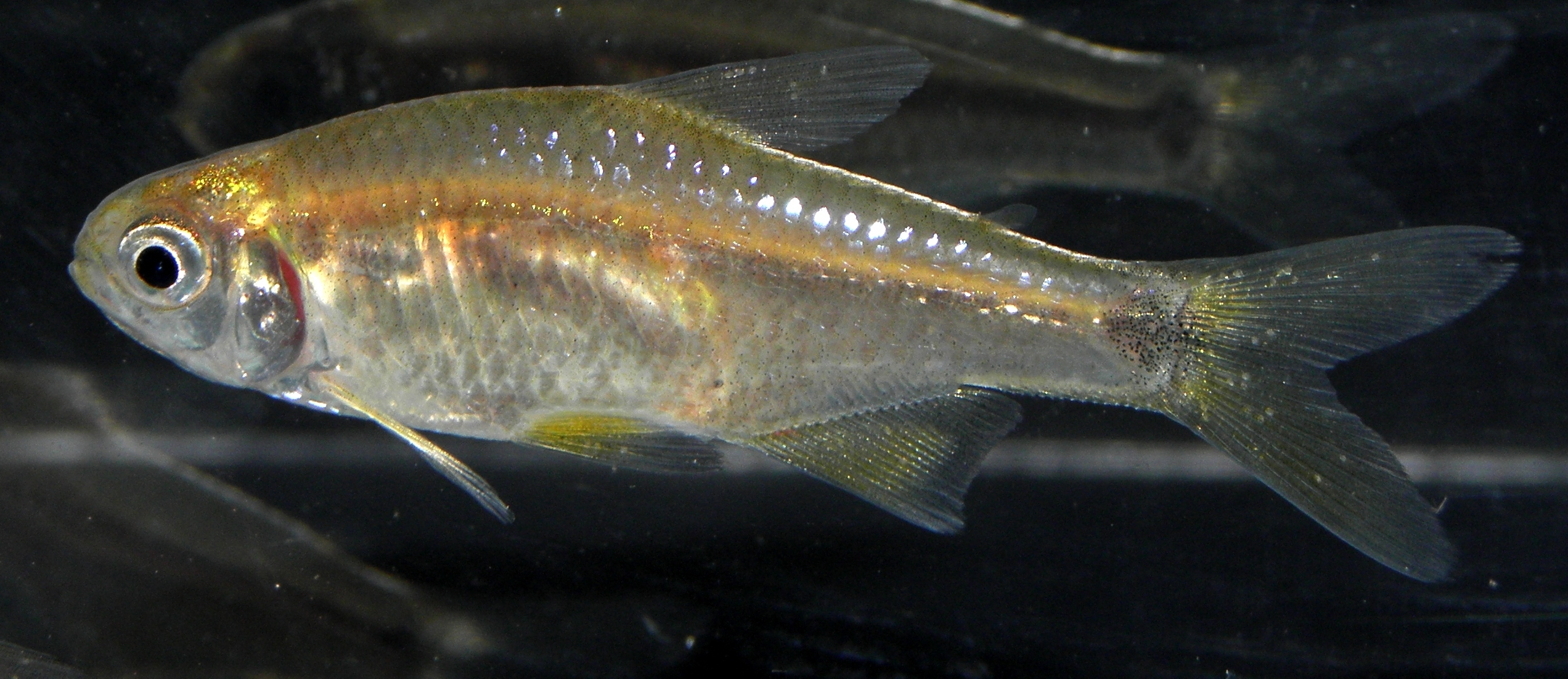

Conservation status
- Least Concern (IUCN 3.1)

Scientific classification
- Kingdom: Animalia
- Phylum: Chordata
- Class: Actinopterygii
- Order: Characiformes
- Family: Characidae
- Genus: Cheirodon
- Species: C. interruptus

Binomial name
- Cheirodon interruptus (Jenyns, 1842)

Synonyms
- Tetragonopterus interruptus Jenyns, 1842; Chirodon monodon Cope, 1894; Cheirodon meinkeni Ahl, 1928; Cheirodon leuciscus Ahl, 1936; Hyphessobrycon nigrifrons Ahl, 1936; Pedalibrycon felipponei Fowler, 1943

= Cheirodon interruptus =

Species of fish

Cheirodon interruptus, the Uruguay tetra or mojarrita, is a species of freshwater ray-finned fish, a characin, belonging to the family Characidae. This fish is found in South America.

== Taxonomy ==
Cheirodon interruptus was first formally described in 1842 by the English clergyman and naturalist Leonard Jenyns, with its type locality given as Laguna del Diario at 34°54'S, 55°00'W in Maldonado, Uruguay. The genus Cheirodon is classified in the subfamily Cheirodontinae, which is classified within the family Characidae in the order Characiformes.

== Etymology ==
Cheirodon interruptus is classified in the genus Cheirodon, a name which is a combination of the Greek cheír, which means "hand", and odon, meaning "tooth". This refers to the teeth of the type species of the genus, C. pisciculus, which are dilated at their tips with at least five subconoical points on each tooth, with the middle point being longer than the others, showing a resemblance to a hand. The specific name, interruptus, means "interrrupted" in Latin, a reference to the short lateral line of this species.

== Description ==
Cheirodon interruptus has a fusiform shaped body with a maximum standard length of 5.8 cm (2.3 in). The dorsal fin has a single spine and 10 soft rays, while the anal fin has two spines and 18 soft rays.

== Distribution and habitat ==
Cheirodon interruptus is found in South America. It is native to the Uruguay River system, the lower Paraná basin, and coastal rivers in southern Brazil, Uruguay and northern Argentina. It has been introduced to Central Chile. The Uruguay tetra is found in eutropic areas of streams, lagoons and flooded areas where there is abundant aquatic vegetation.

== Biology ==
Cheirodon interruptus feeds on plant remnants, algae and aquatic invertebrates. They breed in both the autumn and the spring.
