= Ctenocheirodon =

Conservation status
- Least Concern (IUCN 3.1)

Scientific classification
- Kingdom: Animalia
- Phylum: Chordata
- Class: Actinopterygii
- Order: Characiformes
- Family: Characidae
- Subfamily: Cheirodontinae
- Genus: Ctenocheirodon; L. R. Malabarba & Jerep, 2012
- Species: C. pristis

Binomial name
- Ctenocheirodon pristis L. R. Malabarba & Jerep, 2012

Genus of fishes

Ctenocheirodon is a monospecific genus of freshwater ray-finned fish belonging to the family Characidae. The only species in this genus is Ctenocheirodon pristis, a characin, which is endemic to the drainage basin of the upper Tocantins River in Brazil. This species has a fusiform body with a maximum standard length of 3.4 cm (1.3 in) in females and 3.3 cm (1.3 in) in males. It occurs in clear water over sand and gravel substrates with no vegetation. The genus name prefixes Cheirodon with cteno, which means "comb", and the specific name pritis, means "saw", both names being a reference to the "ventral procurrent caudal-fin arrangement of males".
