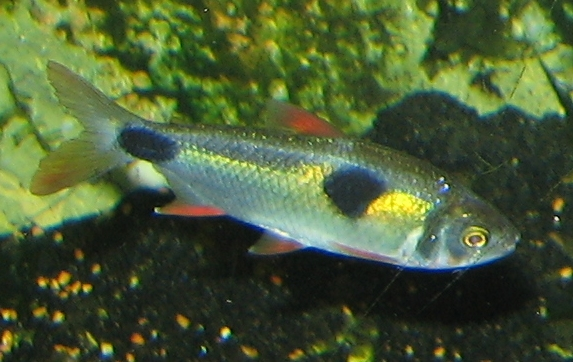
- Bucktooth tetra (Exodon paradoxus)

Scientific classification
- Kingdom: Animalia
- Phylum: Chordata
- Class: Actinopterygii
- Order: Characiformes
- Family: Characidae
- Subfamily: Exodontinae; Fowler, 1958

Type genus
- Exodon Müller & Troschel, 1844

Genera
- see text

= Exodontinae =

Subfamily of fishes

Exodontidae is a subfamily of freshwater ray-finned fishes, the toothy or lepidophagous characins, belonging to the family Characidae. The fishes in this subfamily are found in South America. Until 2024, the family Characidae was considered to include many taxa, sometimes even including African taxa. However, in 2024 a molecular phylogenetic study showed that Characidae, which then included only Neotropical taxa, sensu lato was polyphyletic and the families Spintherobolidae, Stevardiidae, Characidae and Acestrorhamphidae were recognised, with Characidae being classified into five subfamilies, including Exodontinae.

== Genera ==
Exodontinae contains the following genera:

- Bryconexodon Géry, 1980
- Exodon Müller & Troschel, 1844
- Roeboexodon Géry, 1959
