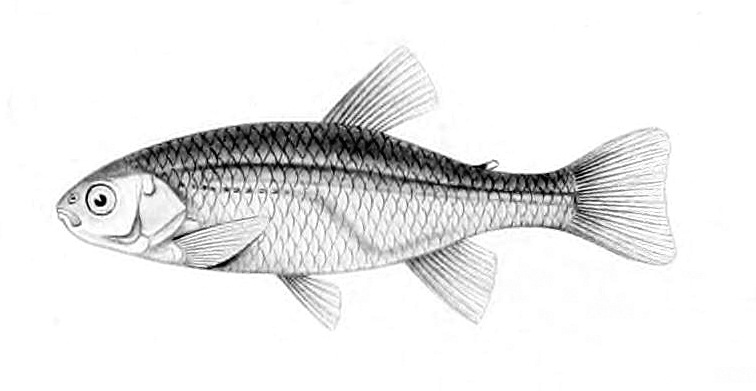

Conservation status
- Endangered (IUCN 3.1)

Scientific classification
- Kingdom: Animalia
- Phylum: Chordata
- Class: Actinopterygii
- Order: Characiformes
- Family: Characidae
- Genus: Cheirodon
- Species: C. pisciculus

Binomial name
- Cheirodon pisciculus Girard, 1855

Synonyms
- Cheirodon annae McAtee, 1903

= Cheirodon pisciculus =

Species of fish

Cheirodon pisciculus is a species of freshwater ray-finned fish, a characin, belonging to the family Characidae. This species is endemic to Chile.

== Taxonomy ==
Cheirodon pisciculus was first formally described in 1855 by the French biologist Charles Frédéric Girard, with its type locality given as ponds in the vicinity of Santiago in Chile. When he described this species, Girard classified it in a new monospecific genus, Cheirodon, making this species the type species of that genus by monotypy. The genus Cheirodon is classified in the subfamily Cheirodontinae, which is classified within the family Characidae in the order Characiformes.

== Etymology ==
Cheirodon pisciculus is the type species of the genus Cheirodon, a name which is a combination of the Greek cheír, which means "hand", and "odon", meaning "tooth". This refers to the teeth of this species, which are dilated at their tips with at least five subconoical points on each tooth, with the middle point being longer than the others, showing a resemblance to a hand. The specific name, pisiculus, means "little fish". Girard did not explain this name, but it is thought it applies to the small size of this fish.

== Description ==
Cheirodon pisciculus has a maximum standard length of 5.5 cm (2.2 in).

== Distribution and habitat ==
Cheirodon pisciculus is endemic to Chile, where it is found in the Huasco River basin at 28°S, south to the Rapel River basin at 34°S. This is a common species in pools with a slow or almost no current, such as the backwaters of rivers and shoreline areas of lakes, where there are aquatic macrophytes. Only larger adults are found in areas with a swifter current.

== Conservation status ==
Cheirodon pisciculus is classified as Endangered by the International Union for Conservation of Nature. Its range is in an area of high and growing human population, and this species is threatened by habitat degradation due to pollution and hydroelectric developments. An additional threat is the presence of invasive alien fish species such as the common carp (Cyprinus carpio), Eastern mosquitofish (Gambusia holbrooki), brown trout (Salmo trutta), rainbow trout (Oncorhynchus mykiss) and Cheirodon interruptus.
