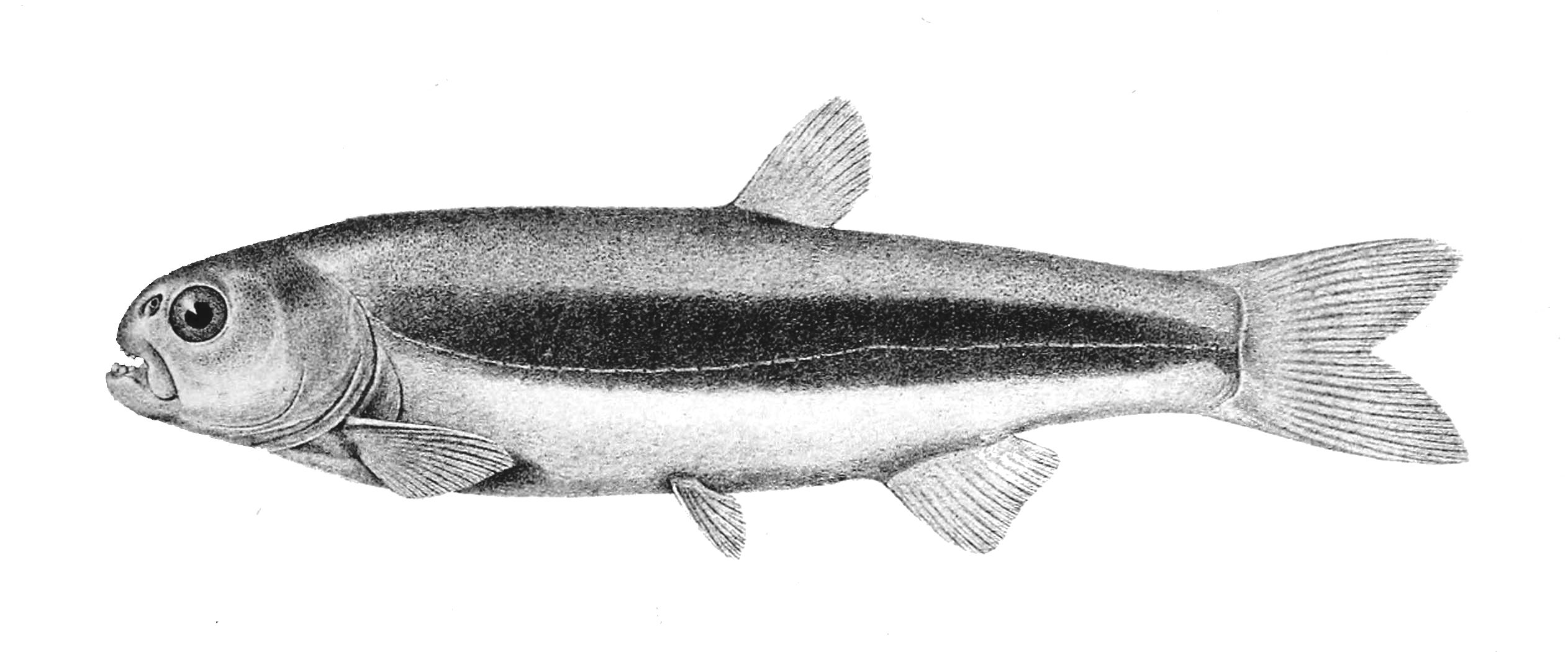

Conservation status
- Critically Endangered (IUCN 3.1)

Scientific classification
- Kingdom: Animalia
- Phylum: Chordata
- Class: Actinopterygii
- Division: Teleostei
- Order: Characiformes
- Family: incertae sedis
- Genus: Gymnocharacinus; Steindachner, 1903
- Species: G. bergii

Binomial name
- Gymnocharacinus bergii Steindachner, 1903

Synonyms
- Gymnocharacinus bergi Steindachner, 1903 [orth. error]

= Naked characin =

Species of fish

The naked characin (Gymnocharacinus bergii) is a species of freshwater ray-finned fish. A characin, it belongs to the suborder Characoidei. It is also the only species in the genus Gymnocharacinus. This taxon has not been assigned to a particular family within the Characoidei and is considered to be incertae sedis, i.e. its taxonomic affinities are, as yet, unclear. The naked tetra attains a maximum total length of 7.5 cm (3.0 in). Adults have no scales, the origin of its English common name.

== Distribution and Habitat ==
G. bergii is the southernmost-occurring member of the characin group (together with some Cheirodon species from Chile) and it is endemic to the headwaters of a stream near the village Valcheta in the northern part of the Patagonia region of Argentina, which is sourced from a thermal spring.

== Conservation ==
G. bergii is considered endangered because of competition from the Uruguay tetra (Cheirodon interruptus) and predation from the rainbow trout (Oncorhynchus mykiss), both being invasive species within the naked tetra's restricted range.
