= Bryconexodon juruenae =

Conservation status
- Least Concern (IUCN 3.1)

Scientific classification
- Kingdom: Animalia
- Phylum: Chordata
- Class: Actinopterygii
- Order: Characiformes
- Family: Characidae
- Genus: Bryconexodon
- Species: B. juruenae

Binomial name
- Bryconexodon juruenae Géry, 1980

Species of ray-finned fish

Bryconexodon juruenae is a species of freshwater ray-finned fish, a characin, belonging to the family Characidae. This species is endemic to the Upper Tapajós River basin, Brazil. The specific name, juruenae, refers to the type locality, the Rio Juruena in Mato Grosso. This species is found in the main channels and tributaries of the Teles Pires and Juruena rivers. They are found in clear, flowing waters and feed on the scales of other fishes. B. juruenae has a maximum standard length of 12.5 cm (4.9 in).
