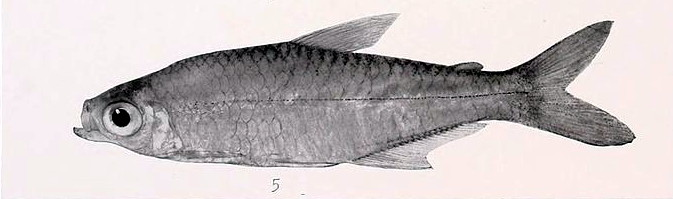
- Aphyodite grammica

Scientific classification
- Kingdom: Animalia
- Phylum: Chordata
- Class: Actinopterygii
- Order: Characiformes
- Family: Characidae
- Subfamily: Aphyoditeinae
- Genus: Aphyodite; C. H. Eigenmann, 1912

= Aphyodite =

Genus of fishes

Aphyodite is a genus of characin in the family Characidae. It contains three species. It was originally described as a monotypic genus containing only Aphyodite grammica, which is endemic to the Essequibo River basin in Guyana; however, two more species were described in 2017: Aphyodite apiaka from the Solimões river basin and Aphyodite tupebas from the Madeira river basin.

== Species ==
There are currently three described species in Aphyodite:

- Aphyodite apiaka Esguícero & Castro, 2017
- Aphyodite grammica C. H. Eigenmann, 1912
- Aphyodite tupebas Esguícero & Castro, 2017
