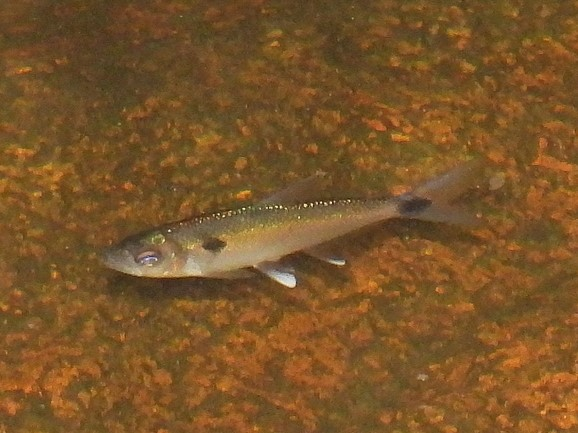

Conservation status
- Least Concern (IUCN 3.1)

Scientific classification
- Kingdom: Animalia
- Phylum: Chordata
- Class: Actinopterygii
- Order: Characiformes
- Family: Characidae
- Genus: Bryconexodon
- Species: B. trombetasi

Binomial name
- Bryconexodon trombetasi Jégu, dos Santos & E. J. G. Ferreira, 1991

= Bryconexodon trombetasi =

Species of ray-finned fish

Bryconexodon trombetasi is a species of freshwater ray-finned fish, a characin, belonging to the family Characidae. This species is endemic to Brazil. It is found in the Trombetas River basin in Brazil. This species reaches a length of 11.7 cm (4.6 in). The specific name, trombetasi, refers to the type locality, the Trombetas River in Pará.
