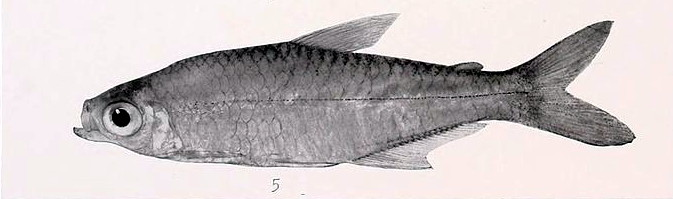
- Aphyodite grammica

Scientific classification
- Domain: Eukaryota
- Kingdom: Animalia
- Phylum: Chordata
- Class: Actinopterygii
- Order: Characiformes
- Family: Characidae
- Genus: Aphyodite
- Species: A. grammica

Binomial name
- Aphyodite grammica C. H. Eigenmann, 1912

= Aphyodite grammica =

Species of fish

Aphyodite grammica is a species of characin in the tribe Pristellini. It is found in parts of the Essequibo and Amazon River basins in Guyana.

== Taxonomy ==
Aphyodite was originally described as a monotypic taxon in 1912, but over a century later two more species were described in 2017.

Aphyodite comes from the Greek aphyodes 'sardine-colored'.
