= Cheirodontops =

Conservation status
- Least Concern (IUCN 3.1)

Scientific classification
- Kingdom: Animalia
- Phylum: Chordata
- Class: Actinopterygii
- Order: Characiformes
- Family: Characidae
- Subfamily: Cheirodontinae
- Genus: Cheirodontops; Schultz, 1944
- Species: C. geayi

Binomial name
- Cheirodontops geayi Schultz, 1944

Genus of fishes

Cheirodontops is a monospecific genus of freshwater ray-finned fish belonging to the family Characidae. The only species in this genus is Cheirodontops geayi, a characin, which is endemic to the basin of the Orinoco in Colombia and Venezuela. This small fish has a fusiform body shape and attains a maximum standard length of 4.0 cm (1.6 in). The genus name, Cheirodontops, suffixes the genus name Cheirodon with ops, which means "eye" or "face" and is an allusion to the similarity of this taxon to other fishes in the subfamily Cheirodontinae, although this species has a complete lateral line. The specific name, geayi, honours the French pharmacist and naturalist Martin François Geay who wrote a book on the fishes of the Orinoco, "Pêches dans les Affluentes de l'Orinoque", published in 1896–1897.
