= Cheirodon galusdae =

Conservation status
- Least Concern (IUCN 3.1)

Scientific classification
- Kingdom: Animalia
- Phylum: Chordata
- Class: Actinopterygii
- Order: Characiformes
- Family: Characidae
- Genus: Cheirodon
- Species: C. galusdae

Binomial name
- Cheirodon galusdae C. H. Eigenmann, 1928

Species of fish

Cheirodon galusdae is a species of freshwater ray-finned fish, a characin, belonging to the family Characidae. This species is endemic to Chile.

This species was first formally described in 1982 by the German-born American ichthyologist Carl H. Eigenmann with its type locality given as the Río Locomilla at San Xavier in Chile. It was named in honor of Piedro Galusda, superintendent of the state hatchery at Lautaro, where he planned the collecting of fish during Eigenmann's expedition.
