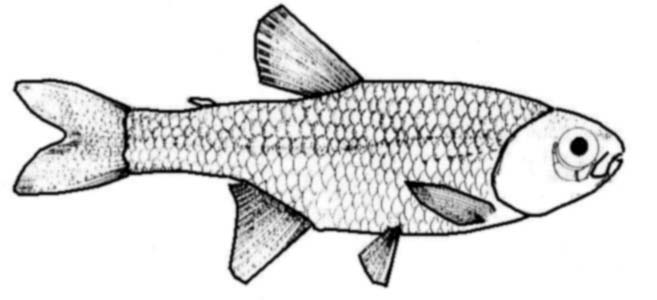

Conservation status
- Endangered (IUCN 3.1)

Scientific classification
- Kingdom: Animalia
- Phylum: Chordata
- Class: Actinopterygii
- Order: Characiformes
- Family: Characidae
- Genus: Cheirodon
- Species: C. kiliani

Binomial name
- Cheirodon kiliani Campos, 1982

= Cheirodon kiliani =

Species of fish

Cheirodon kiliani is a species of freshwater ray-finned fish, a characin, belonging to the family Characidae. This species is endemic to Chile.

This species was first formally described in 1982 by the Chilean limnologist and ichthyologist Hugo Hernes Campos Cereceda with its type locality given as the Río Cau Cau in Chile. Campos named this species in honour of his teacher, the German biologist Ernst Kilian, the founding director of Instituto de Zoología, Austral University of Chile, Chile.
