= Leptagoniates =

Conservation status
- Least Concern (IUCN 3.1)

Scientific classification
- Kingdom: Animalia
- Phylum: Chordata
- Class: Actinopterygii
- Order: Characiformes
- Family: Characidae
- Subfamily: Aphyocharacinae
- Genus: Leptagoniates; Boulenger, 1887
- Species: L. steindachneri

Binomial name
- Leptagoniates steindachneri Boulenger, 1887

Genus of fishes

Leptagoniates is a monospecific genus of ray-finned fish belonging to the family Characidae. It contains the single species Leptagoniates steindachneri, which is found in the Amazon River basin in Ecuador and Peru.

Another species, L. pi, had traditionally been placed in this genus, but it was moved to Protocheirodon in 2016.
