= Amblystilbe =

Conservation status
- Data Deficient (IUCN 3.1)

Scientific classification
- Kingdom: Animalia
- Phylum: Chordata
- Class: Actinopterygii
- Order: Characiformes
- Family: Characidae
- Subfamily: Cheirodontinae
- Genus: Amblystilbe; Fowler, 1940
- Species: A. howesi

Binomial name
- Amblystilbe howesi Fowler, 1940

Synonyms
- Prodontocharax howesi (Fowler, 1940); Prodontocharax alleni Böhlke, 1953

Monotypic genus of fishes

Amblystilbe is a monospecific genus of freshwater ray-finned fish belonging to the family Characidae. The only species in the genus is Amblystilbe howesi, a characin, which is found in the western Amazon basin in Bolivia, Brazil and Peru. This fish has a maximum standard length of 4.2 cm (1.7 in).
