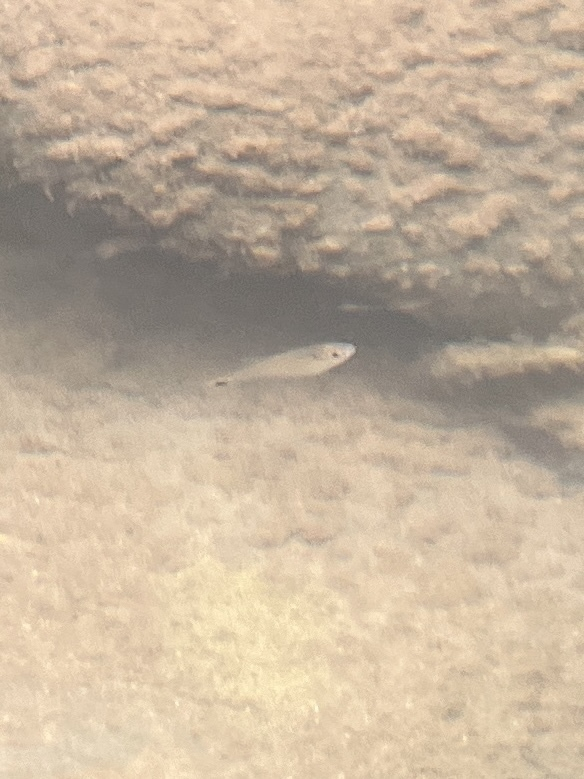

Conservation status
- Least Concern (IUCN 3.1)

Scientific classification
- Kingdom: Animalia
- Phylum: Chordata
- Class: Actinopterygii
- Order: Characiformes
- Family: Characidae
- Subfamily: Cheirodontinae
- Genus: Nanocheirodon; L. R. Malabarba, 1998
- Species: N. insignis

Binomial name
- Nanocheirodon insignis (Steindachner, 1880)

Synonyms
- Chirodon insignis Steindachner, 1880

= Nanocheirodon =

Genus of fishes

Nanocheirodon is a monospecific genus of freshwater ray-finned fish belonging to the family Characidae. The only species in this genus is Nanocheirodon insignis, a characin, which is found in Colombia and Venezuela in the drainage basins of the Magdalena River and Lake Maracaibo.
