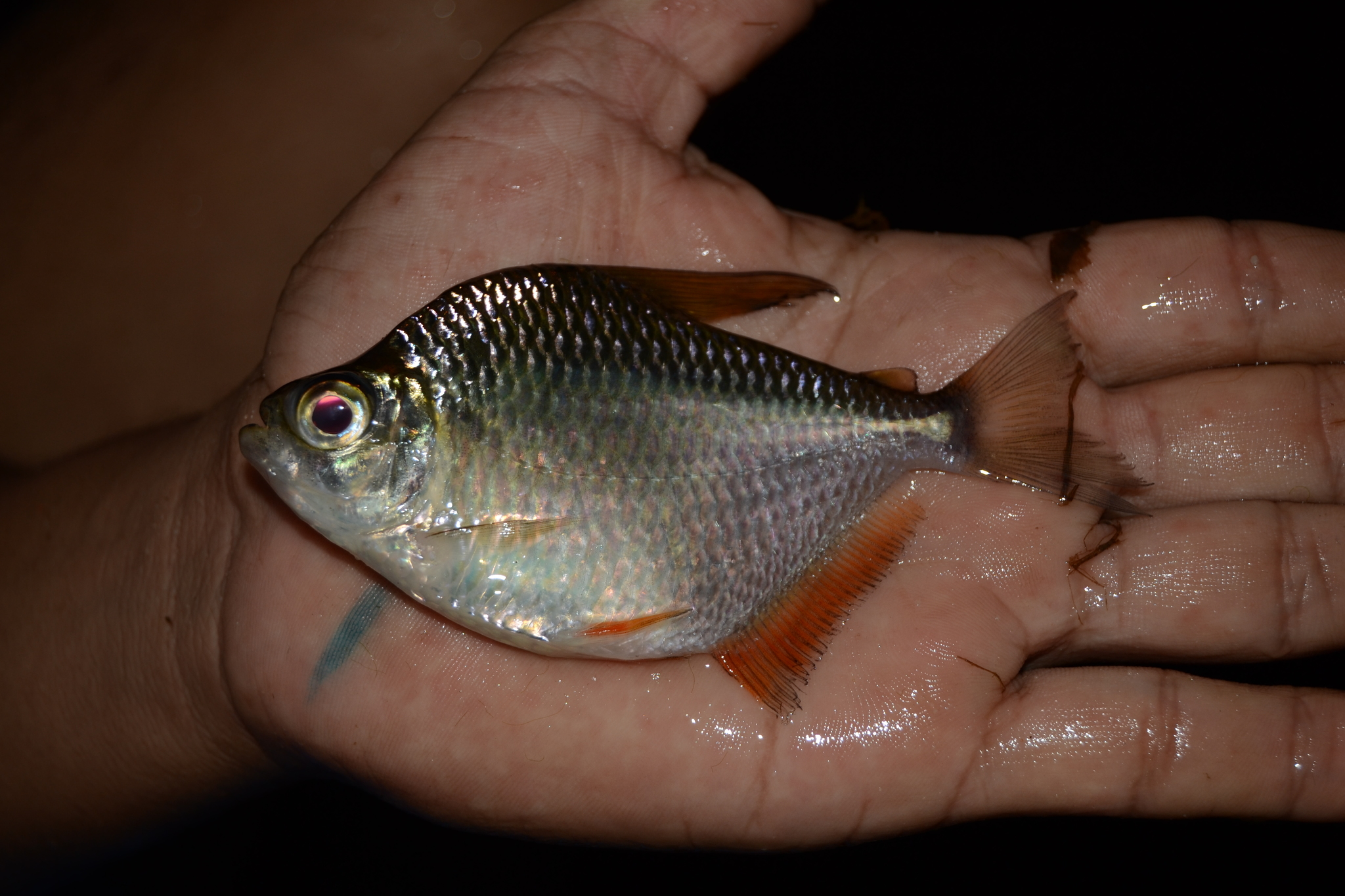
- Tetragonopterus argenteus in Peru

Scientific classification
- Kingdom: Animalia
- Phylum: Chordata
- Class: Actinopterygii
- Order: Characiformes
- Family: Characidae
- Subfamily: Tetragonopterinae; Gill, 1858
- Genus: Tetragonopterus; Cuvier, 1816

Type species
- Tetragonopterus argenteus Cuvier, 1816

= Tetragonopterus =

Genus of fishes

Tetragonopterus is a genus of freshwater ray-finned fishes belonging to the family Characidae. This fishes in this genus are found in South America.

It is the only genus in the subfamily Tetragonopterinae. The subfamily was originally much larger as previously defined, and contained many of the genera known as "tetras". The name "tetra" derives from this former classification.

== Species ==
Tetragonopterus contains the following valid species;

- Tetragonopterus anostomus G. S. C. Silva & Benine, 2011
- Tetragonopterus araguaiensis G. S. C. Silva, Melo, Oliveira & Benine, 2013
- Tetragonopterus argenteus Cuvier, 1816
- Tetragonopterus carvalhoi Melo, Benine, Mariguela & Oliveira, 2011
- Tetragonopterus chalceus Spix & Agassiz, 1829
- Tetragonopterus denticulatus G. S. C. Silva, Melo, Oliveira & Benine, 2013
- Tetragonopterus franciscoensis G. S. C. Silva, Melo, Oliveira & Benine, 2016
- Tetragonopterus georgiae (Géry, 1965)
- Tetragonopterus juruena G. S. C. Silva, Melo, Oliveira & Benine, 2016
- Tetragonopterus kuluene G. S. C. Silva, Melo, Oliveira & Benine, 2016
- Tetragonopterus manaos Urbanski, Melo, G. S. C. Silva & Benine 2018
- Tetragonopterus ommatus G. S. C. Silva, Melo, Oliveira & Benine, 2016
- Tetragonopterus rarus (Zarske, Géry & Isbrücker, 2004)
