= Acinocheirodon =

Conservation status
- Least Concern (IUCN 3.1)

Scientific classification
- Kingdom: Animalia
- Phylum: Chordata
- Class: Actinopterygii
- Order: Characiformes
- Family: Characidae
- Subfamily: Cheirodontinae
- Genus: Acinocheirodon; L. R. Malabarba & S. H. Weitzman, 1999
- Species: A. melanogramma

Binomial name
- Acinocheirodon melanogramma L. R. Malabarba & S. H. Weitzman, 1999

Genus of fishes

Acinocheirodon is a monospecific genus of freshwater ray-finned fish belonging to the family Cheirodontinae, the only species in the genus is Acinocheirodon melanogramma, a characin. This species is found in tributaries of the São Francisco and Jequitinhonha Rivers in Brazil. A. melanogramma is found in clearwater streams with a moderate current and in backwaters. This species has a maximum standard length of 3.8 cm (1.5 in). The populations in the São Francisco River and in the Jequitinhonha River are morphologically distinct.
