= Heterocheirodon =

Scientific classification
- Kingdom: Animalia
- Phylum: Chordata
- Class: Actinopterygii
- Order: Characiformes
- Family: Characidae
- Subfamily: Cheirodontinae
- Genus: Heterocheirodon; L. R. Malabarba, 1998

Type species
- Odontostilbe yatai Casciotta, Miquelarena & Protogino, 1992

Genus of fishes

Heterocheirodon is a genus of freshwater ray-finned fish, characins, belonging to the family Characidae. The fishes in this genus are found in South America, in Argentina, Brazil and Uruguay.

== Species ==
Heterocheirodon contains the following valid species:

- Heterocheirodon jacuiensis L. R. Malabarba & Bertaco, 1999
- Heterocheirodon yatai (Casciotta, Miquelarena & Protogino, 1992)
