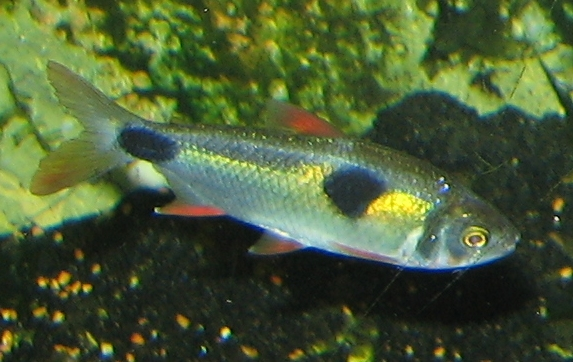

Conservation status
- Least Concern (IUCN 3.1)

Scientific classification
- Kingdom: Animalia
- Phylum: Chordata
- Class: Actinopterygii
- Division: Teleostei
- Order: Characiformes
- Family: Characidae
- Subfamily: Exodontinae
- Genus: Exodon; J. P. Müller & Troschel, 1844
- Species: E. paradoxus

Binomial name
- Exodon paradoxus J. P. Müller & Troschel, 1844

Synonyms
- Epicyrtus exodon Valenciennes, 1850

= Bucktooth tetra =

Species of fish

The bucktooth tetra (Exodon paradoxus) is a species of freshwater ray-finned fish, a characin, belonging to the family Characidae. This fish is found in South America. It is the only species in the monospecific genus Exodon. The bucktooth tetra occasionally turns up in the aquarium trade.

== Taxonomy ==
The bucktooth tetra was first formally described, as Exodon paradocus, in 1844 by the German zoologists Johannes Peter Müller and Franz Hermann Troschel, with its type locality given as the Essequibo River in Guyana. When Müller and Troschel described this species, they classified it in a new monospecific genus, Exodon. This genus is classified in the subfamily Exodontinae, the toothy or lepidophagous characins, of which it is the type genus, which belongs to the family Characidae of the suborder Characoidei of the order Characiformes.

== Etymology ==
The bucktooth tetra is the only species in the genus Exodon. Its name combines exo, meaning "outer" or "external", with odon, meaning tooth, referring to the teeth projecting out. The specific name, paradoxus, means "strange" or "against expectations", also thought to be a reference to the teeth projecting outwards.

== Description ==
The bucktooth tetra has an elongated, laterally compressed body and a forked caudal fin. It attains a maximum standard length of 7.5 cm (3.0 in). There is a black line which extends from the operculum to the caudal peduncle; this joins two black blotches, one near the middle of the body and the other near the caudal peduncle. The background colour is iridescent silver, which can flash green, yellow or red, with yellow, orange-tipped fins.

This species has larger teeth, although they do not live up to the species' common name, but the lips are more serrated than most characins'. They have well developed jaws equipped with pointed teeth; they are cuspid outward projecting pointed tips, an adaptation for their preferred food, the scales of other fishes.

The bucktooth tetra is sexually dimorphic, with the males being distinguished from the females by having the fin rays in the dorsal and anal fins elongated and being slimmer than the females.

== Distribution and habitat ==
The bucktooth tetra is found in South America, where it has a wide but rather disjunct distribution. It has been recorded from the Araguaia, Tocantins, Orinoco, Río Branco, and upper Essequibo River basins in Brazil, Colombia, Guyana and Venezuela. It is normally found in shallow, sandy bottomed areas of rivers, as well as at rapids. The rivers this species are found in are typically flowing through savannas and grasslands.

== Biology ==
The bucktooth tetra is a shoaling fish which is mainly lepidophagous, feeding on the scales of other fishes, with fish sampled from the wild having 88% of their diet made up of fish scales, 10% of insects and other animal matter, and a tiny amount of plant material. The scale feeding habit has led these fishes to develop handedness. Each fish always approaches their intended victim from a favoured side. Fishes attack, biting off scales and then veering towards the fish's tail; right handed fishes attack their victims on their left sides. As they approach the attacked fish, they tilt their heads towards that fish. When feeding on larger food items, a shoal of these fish can form a feeding ball as each fish dashes to the food item in the centre of the shoal to bite off a piece of the food.

The bucktooth tetra is oviparous. Following fertilisation, the female scatters the eggs on the substrate, and they hatch into fry after 2–3 days.

== Utilisation ==
The bucktooth tetra is uncommon in the aquarium trade. Because of its scale-eating habits it is not considered an appropriate species for community tanks. Fish keepers are advised that this species should normally be kept in larger groups in a single species tank. Keeping this fish in groups of less than 8–12 will lead to some fishes being picked on by the others. It has been bred in captivity, but this is difficult and uncommon due to the aggressive nature of these fish.

This species is used by local people to clean dishes. Dirty pots and pans, cutlery and crockery are placed in the river and the shoals of bucktooth tetra feed on the food remnants and clean the utensils, forming a "feeding frenzy" around the dirty dishes.

== In culture ==
The bucktooth tetra was illustrated on a stamp issued by Equatorial Guinea in 1975.

== Conservation status ==
The bucktooth tetra is assessed to be Least Concern by the International Union for Conservation of Nature because it has a wide distribution and is common throughout that distribution.

== See also ==
- List of freshwater aquarium fish species
