= Kolpotocheirodon =

Scientific classification
- Kingdom: Animalia
- Phylum: Chordata
- Class: Actinopterygii
- Order: Characiformes
- Family: Characidae
- Subfamily: Cheirodontinae
- Genus: Kolpotocheirodon; L. R. Malabarba & Weitzman, 2000

Type species
- Kolpotocheirodon theloura L. R. Malabarba & Weitzman, 2000

Genus of fishes

Kolpotocheirodon is a genus of freshwater ray-finned fish, characins, belonging to the family Characidae. The fishes in this genus are endemic to the uppermost Paraná, Paraguaçu and São Francisco basins in the central Brazilian Plateau. They feed on small invertebrates. Kolpotocheirodon reach up to around 3 cm (1.2 in) in standard length. Both species in the genus are considered threatened by Brazil's Ministry of the Environment.

== Species ==
The currently recognized species in this genus are:

- Kolpotocheirodon figueiredoi L. R. Malabarba, F. C. T. Lima & Weitzman, 2004
- Kolpotocheirodon theloura L. R. Malabarba & Weitzman, 2000
