= Aphyocharacidium =

Scientific classification
- Kingdom: Animalia
- Phylum: Chordata
- Class: Actinopterygii
- Order: Characiformes
- Family: Characidae
- Subfamily: Aphyocharacinae
- Genus: Aphyocharacidium; Géry, 1960

Type species
- Odontostilbe melandetus C. H. Eigenmann, 1912

Genus of fishes

Aphyocharacidium is a genus of freshwater ray-finned fishes, characins belonging to the subfamily Aphyocharacinae within the family Characidae. The fishes in this genus are found in tropical South America.

== Species ==
Aphyocharacidium contains the following valid species:

- Aphyocharacidium bolivianum Géry, 1973
- Aphyocharacidium melandetum (C. H. Eigenmann, 1912)
