= Compsura =

Scientific classification
- Kingdom: Animalia
- Phylum: Chordata
- Class: Actinopterygii
- Order: Characiformes
- Family: Characidae
- Subfamily: Cheirodontinae
- Genus: Compsura; C. H. Eigenmann, 1915

Type species
- Compsura heterura C. H. Eigenmann, 1915

Genus of fishes

Compsura is a genus of freshwater ray-finned fish, characins, belonging to the family Characidae. One species occurs in Panama (C. gorgonae), and the other in eastern Brazil.

== Species ==
Compsura contains the following valid species:

- Compsura gorgonae (Evermann & Goldsborough, 1909)
- Compsura heterura C. H. Eigenmann, 1915
