= Atopomesus =

Conservation status
- Least Concern (IUCN 3.1)

Scientific classification
- Kingdom: Animalia
- Phylum: Chordata
- Class: Actinopterygii
- Order: Characiformes
- Family: Characidae
- Subfamily: Characinae
- Genus: Atopomesus; G. S. Myers, 1927
- Species: A. pachyodus

Binomial name
- Atopomesus pachyodus G. S. Myers, 1927

Genus of fishes

Atopomesus is a monospecific genus of fish belonging to the family Characidae. The only species in the genus is Atopomesus pachyodus, a characin. This fish is found in South America where it occurs in the mainstream of the Rio Negro, from near Manaus to the rio Casiquiare in Venezuela, and from the lower rio Teles Pires in the Tapajós basin, in Brazil, Colombia and Venezuela.
