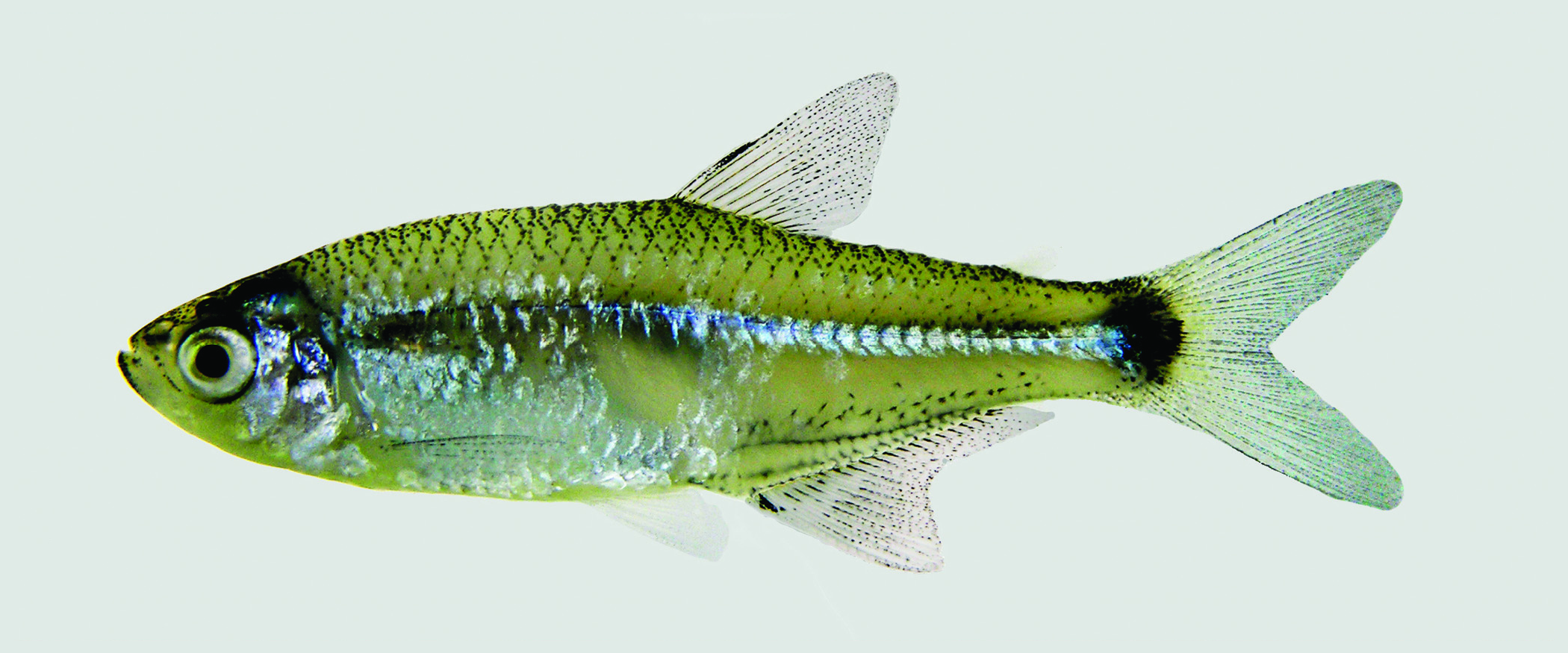
- Macropsobrycon uruguayanae

Scientific classification
- Kingdom: Animalia
- Phylum: Chordata
- Class: Actinopterygii
- Order: Characiformes
- Family: Characidae
- Subfamily: Cheirodontinae
- Genus: Macropsobrycon; C. H. Eigenmann, 1915

Type species
- Macropsobrycon uruguayanae C. H. Eigenmann, 1915

= Macropsobrycon =

Genus of fishes

Macropsobrycon is a genus of freshwater ray-finned fish, characins, belonging to the family Characidae. These fishes are found in South America.

== Species ==
Macropsobrycon contains the following valid species:

- Macropsobrycon uruguayanae C. H. Eigenmann, 1915 – Uruguay, Tramandaí and Lagoa dos Patos basins.
- Macropsobrycon xinguensis Géry, 1973 – Xingu River basin.
