= Acanthocharax =

Conservation status
- Least Concern (IUCN 3.1)

Scientific classification
- Kingdom: Animalia
- Phylum: Chordata
- Class: Actinopterygii
- Order: Characiformes
- Family: Characidae
- Subfamily: Characinae
- Genus: Acanthocharax; C. H. Eigenmann, 1912
- Species: A. microlepis

Binomial name
- Acanthocharax microlepis C. H. Eigenmann, 1912

Monotypic genus of fishes

Acanthocharax is a genus of freshwater ray-finned fish belonging to the family Characidae. It contains the single species Acanthocharax microlepis, which is endemic to Guyana, where it is found in the Essequibo River basin. It is found in fresh water at pelagic depths. This species is native to a tropical climate. This fish can reach a length of about 8.5 cm (3.3 in).
