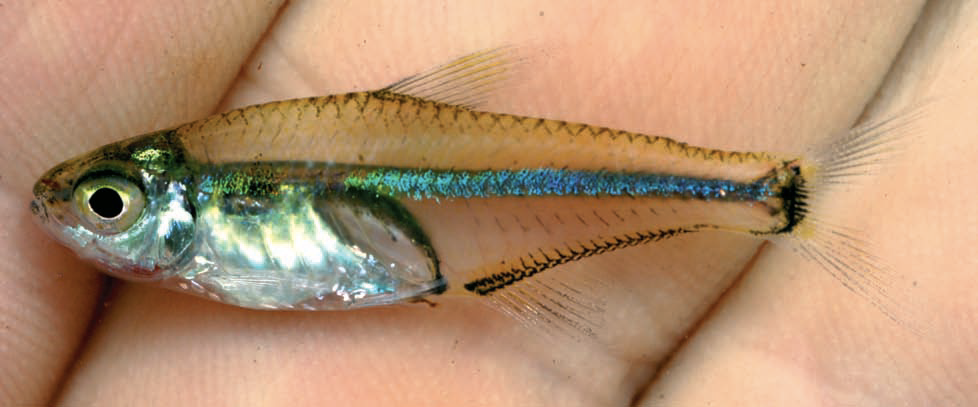
- Cyanogaster geisleri

Scientific classification
- Kingdom: Animalia
- Phylum: Chordata
- Class: Actinopterygii
- Order: Characiformes
- Family: Characidae
- Subfamily: Aphyocharacinae
- Genus: Cyanogaster; Mattox, Britz, Toledo-Piza & Marinho, 2013

Type species
- Cyanogaster noctivaga Mattox, Britz, Toledo-Piza & Marinho, 2013

= Cyanogaster =

Genus of fish

Cyanogaster is a small genus of ray-finned fishes belonging to the subfamily Aphyocharacinae, the glass characins, within the family Characidae. The fishes in this genus are found in the river basins of the Amazon and Orinoco in South America.

== Species ==
Cyanogaster contains the following valid species:

- Cyanogaster geisleri (Zarske & Géry, 2007)
- Cyanogaster noctivaga Mattox, Britz, Toledo-Piza & Marinho, 2013
