= Microschemobrycon =

Scientific classification
- Kingdom: Animalia
- Phylum: Chordata
- Class: Actinopterygii
- Order: Characiformes
- Family: Characidae
- Subfamily: Characinae
- Genus: Microschemobrycon; C. H. Eigenmann, 1915

Type species
- Microschemobrycon guaporensis C. H. Eigenmann, 1915

Species
- See text

Genus of fishes

Microschemobrycon is a genus of freshwater ray-finned fishes, characins, belonging to the family Characidae. The fishes in this genus are found in South America.

== Species ==
Microschemobrycon contains the following valid species:

- Microschemobrycon callops J. E. Böhlke, 1953
- Microschemobrycon casiquiare J. E. Böhlke, 1953
- Microschemobrycon cryptogrammus Ohara, Jerep & Cavallaro, 2019
- Microschemobrycon elongatus Géry, 1973
- Microschemobrycon geisleri Géry, 1973
- Microschemobrycon guaporensis C. H. Eigenmann, 1915
- Microschemobrycon melanotus (C. H. Eigenmann, 1912)
- Microschemobrycon meyburgi Meinken, 1975
