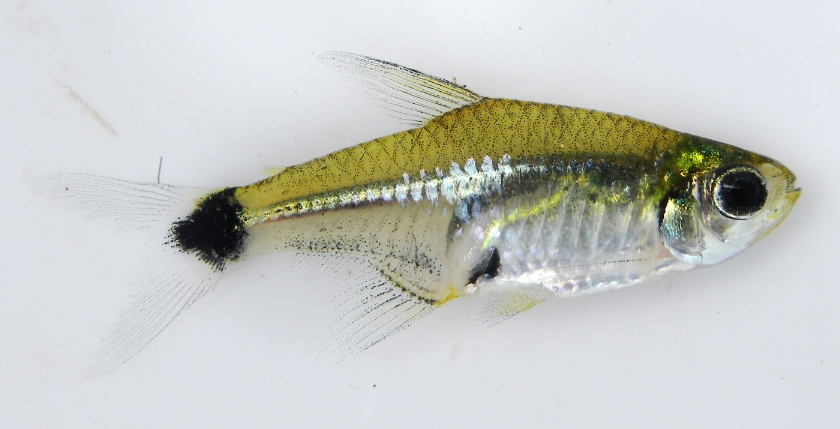
- Serrapinnus kriegi

Scientific classification
- Kingdom: Animalia
- Phylum: Chordata
- Class: Actinopterygii
- Order: Characiformes
- Family: Characidae
- Subfamily: Cheirodontinae
- Genus: Serrapinnus; L. R. Malabarba, 1998

Type species
- Chirodon piaba Lütken, 1875

= Serrapinnus =

Genus of fishes

Serrapinnus is a genus of freshwater ray-finned fish belonging to the family Characidae. The fishes in this genus are found in tropical South America.

== Species ==
Serrapinnus contains the following valid species:

- Serrapinnus aster Malabarba & Jerep. 2014
- Serrapinnus calliurus (Boulenger, 1900)
- Serrapinnus gracilis (Géry, 1960)
- Serrapinnus heterodon (C. H. Eigenmann, 1915)
- Serrapinnus kriegi (Schindler, 1937)
- Serrapinnus littoris (Géry, 1960)
- Serrapinnus lucindai Jerep & Malabarba, 2014
- Serrapinnus malabarbai Jerep, Dagosta & Ohara, 2018
- Serrapinnus microdon (C. H. Eigenmann, 1915)
- Serrapinnus notomelas (C. H. Eigenmann, 1915)
- Serrapinnus piaba (Lütken, 1875)
- Serrapinnus potiguar Jerep & Malabarba, 2014
- Serrapinnus sterbai Zarske, 2012
- Serrapinnus tocantinensis Malabarba & Jerep, 2014
- Serrapinnus zanatae Jerep, Camelier & Malabarba, 2016
