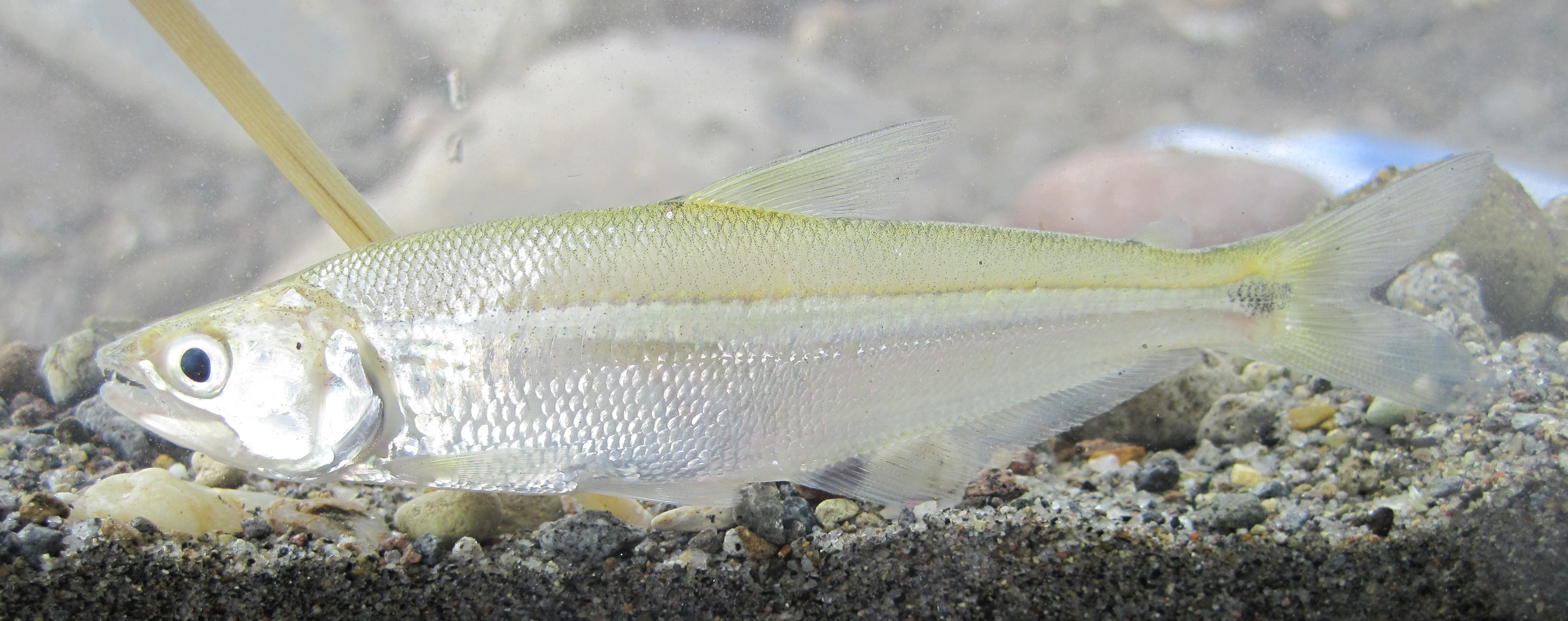
- Acestrocephalus anomalus

Scientific classification
- Kingdom: Animalia
- Phylum: Chordata
- Class: Actinopterygii
- Order: Characiformes
- Family: Characidae
- Subfamily: Characinae
- Genus: Acestrocephalus; C. H. Eigenmann, 1910

Type species
- Xiphorhamphus anomalus Steindachner, 1880

= Acestrocephalus =

Genus of characin

Acestrocephalus is a genus of freshwater ray-finned fishes, characins, belonging to the family Characidae. The fishes in this genus are found in South America.

== Species ==
Acestrocephalus contains the following valid species:

- Acestrocephalus acutus Menezes, 2006
- Acestrocephalus anomalus (Steindachner, 1880)
- Acestrocephalus boehlkei Menezes, 1977
- Acestrocephalus maculosus Menezes, 2006
- Acestrocephalus nigrifasciatus Menezes, 2006
- Acestrocephalus pallidus Menezes, 2006
- Acestrocephalus sardina (Fowler, 1913)
- Acestrocephalus stigmatus Menezes, 2006
