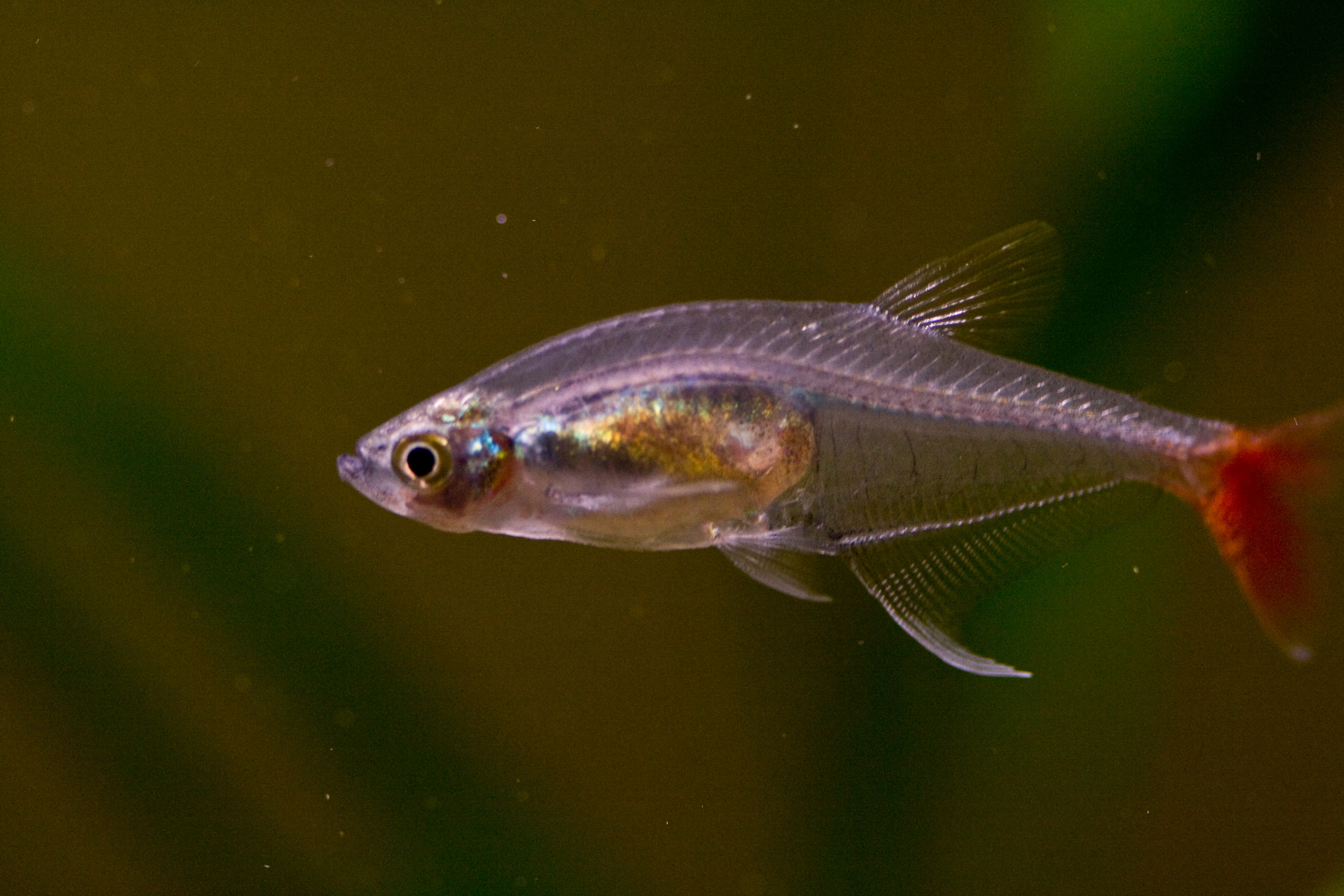
- Glass bloodfin tetra

Scientific classification
- Kingdom: Animalia
- Phylum: Chordata
- Class: Actinopterygii
- Order: Characiformes
- Family: Characidae
- Subfamily: Aphyocharacinae
- Genus: Prionobrama; Fowler, 1913

Type species
- Prionobrama madeirae Fowler, 1913

Synonyms
- Bleptonema C. H. Eigenmann, 1914

= Prionobrama =

Genus of fishes

Prionobrama is a genus of freshwater ray-finned fishes, characins, belonging to the family Characidae. These fishes are found in South America.

== Species ==
Prionobrama contains the following valid species:

- Prionobrama filigera (Cope, 1870) (Glass bloodfin tetra)
- Prionobrama paraguayensis (C. H. Eigenmann, 1914)
