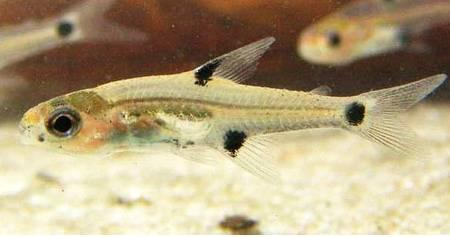
- Amazonspinther dalmata

Scientific classification
- Kingdom: Animalia
- Phylum: Chordata
- Class: Actinopterygii
- (unranked): Otophysi
- Order: Characiformes
- Suborder: Characoidei
- Family: Spintherobolidae; Mirande, 2018

Genera
- see text

= Spintherobolidae =

Spintherobolidae Temporal range: Late Oligocene to present

Family of freshwater fishes

Spintherobolidae, also known as piquiras, are a small family of freshwater fish in the order Characiformes. It contains only two genera (one monotypic and the other with four species), both of which are endemic to Brazil. Both genera in this family were originally placed in the Characidae (originally in the Cheirodontini, then in a distinct subfamily in 2018), but in 2024 they were upgraded to being their own family.

The following genera are placed in this family:

- Amazonspinther Bührnheim, Carvalho, Malabarba & Weitzman, 2008
- Spintherobolus C. H. Eigenmann, 1911

Of the two extant genera, the single species of Amazonspinther is found in the Amazon basin, while the four species of Spintherobolus are restricted to rivers draining the Atlantic Forest.

In addition, a single fossil genus, †Megacheirodon Malabarba, 1998, is known from the Late Oligocene-aged Tremembé Formation of Brazil. As its name suggests, it was initially also placed in the Cheirodontini, but morphological analyses have found it to be closely related to Amazonspinther and Spintherobolus, and in 2013 it was proposed to move all three out of Cheirodontini.
