= Aphyocheirodon =

Conservation status
- Vulnerable (IUCN 3.1)

Scientific classification
- Kingdom: Animalia
- Phylum: Chordata
- Class: Actinopterygii
- Order: Characiformes
- Family: Characidae
- Subfamily: Cheirodontinae
- Genus: Aphyocheirodon; C. H. Eigenmann, 1915
- Species: A. hemigrammus

Binomial name
- Aphyocheirodon hemigrammus C. H. Eigenmann, 1915

Monotypic genus of fishes

Aphyocheirodon is a monospecific genus of freshwater ray-finned fish belonging to the family Cheirodontinae.

The only species in the genus is Aphyocheirodon hemigrammus, a characin, which is endemic to Brazil, and has a highly restricted range in the upper basin of the Paraná River, being found in the Rio Grande in São Paulo and Minas Gerais, and in the Mogi-Guaçu River in São Paulo. This species occurs in shallow lagoons with a mean depth of 3 m (9.8 ft), with a mixed substrate of mud and sand where there is abundant aquatic vegetation. It can also be found in lower-order streams with rapids and backwaters. Floodplain drainage and landfilling have been observed to cause a decline in the quality of habitat.

This species has a maximum total length of 15 cm (5.9 in).
