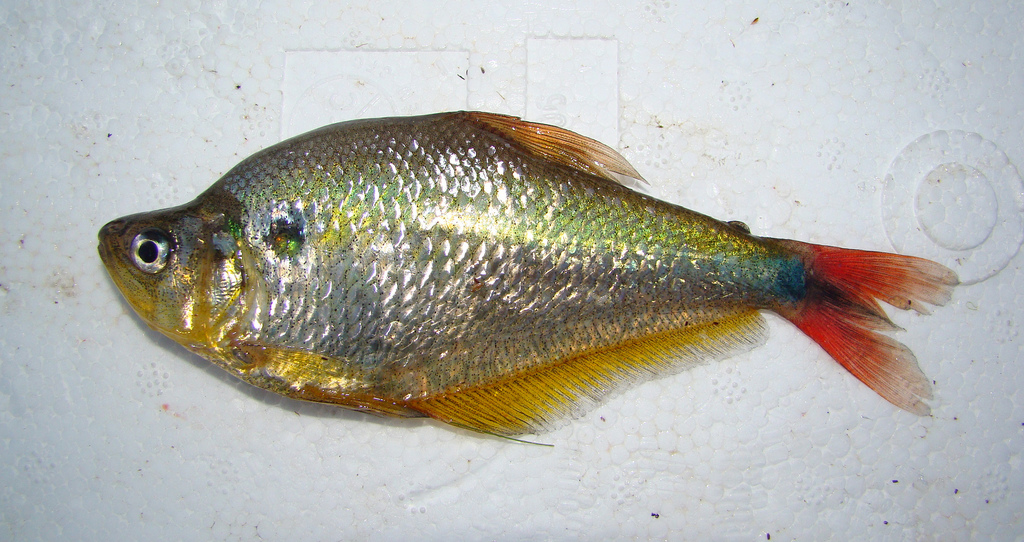
- Charax stenopterus

Scientific classification
- Kingdom: Animalia
- Phylum: Chordata
- Class: Actinopterygii
- Order: Characiformes
- Family: Characidae
- Subfamily: Characinae; Latreille, 1825

Type genus
- Charax Scopoli, 1777

Synonyms
- Characinus Lacépède, 1803; Epicyrtus J. P. Müller & Troschel, 1844; Anacyrtus Günther, 1864; Asiphonichthys Cope, 1894; Moralesia Fowler, 1943; Charaxodon Fernández-Yépez, 1947; Moralesicus Fowler, 1958

= Characinae =

Characinae is a subfamily of freshwater ray-finned fishes, the nominate subfamily of the family Characidae. The fishes in this subfamily are found in Central and South America, from southern Mexico to Argentina.

== Genera ==
Characinae contains the following valid genera:

- Acanthocharax C. H. Eigenmann, 1912
- Acestrocephalus C. H. Eigenmann, 1910
- Atopomesus Myers, 1927
- Charax Scopoli, 1777
- Cynopotamus Valenciennes, 1850
- Galeocharax Fowler 1910
- Microschemobrycon C. H. Eigenmann, 1915
- Phenacogaster C. H. Eigenmann, 1907
- Roeboides Günther, 1864
