= Prodontocharax =

Scientific classification
- Kingdom: Animalia
- Phylum: Chordata
- Class: Actinopterygii
- Order: Characiformes
- Family: Characidae
- Subfamily: Cheirodontinae
- Genus: Prodontocharax; N. E. Pearson, 1924

Type species
- Prodontocharax melanotus N. E. Pearson, 1924

Genus of fishes

Prodontocharax is a genus of freshwater ray-finned fish belonging to the family Characidae. The fishes in this genus are found in South America.

== Species ==
Prodontocharax contains the following valid species:

- Prodontocharax aquilaepinnae Bertaco, Chuctaya, Jerep & Malabarba, 2023
- Prodontocharax melanotus N. E. Pearson, 1924
