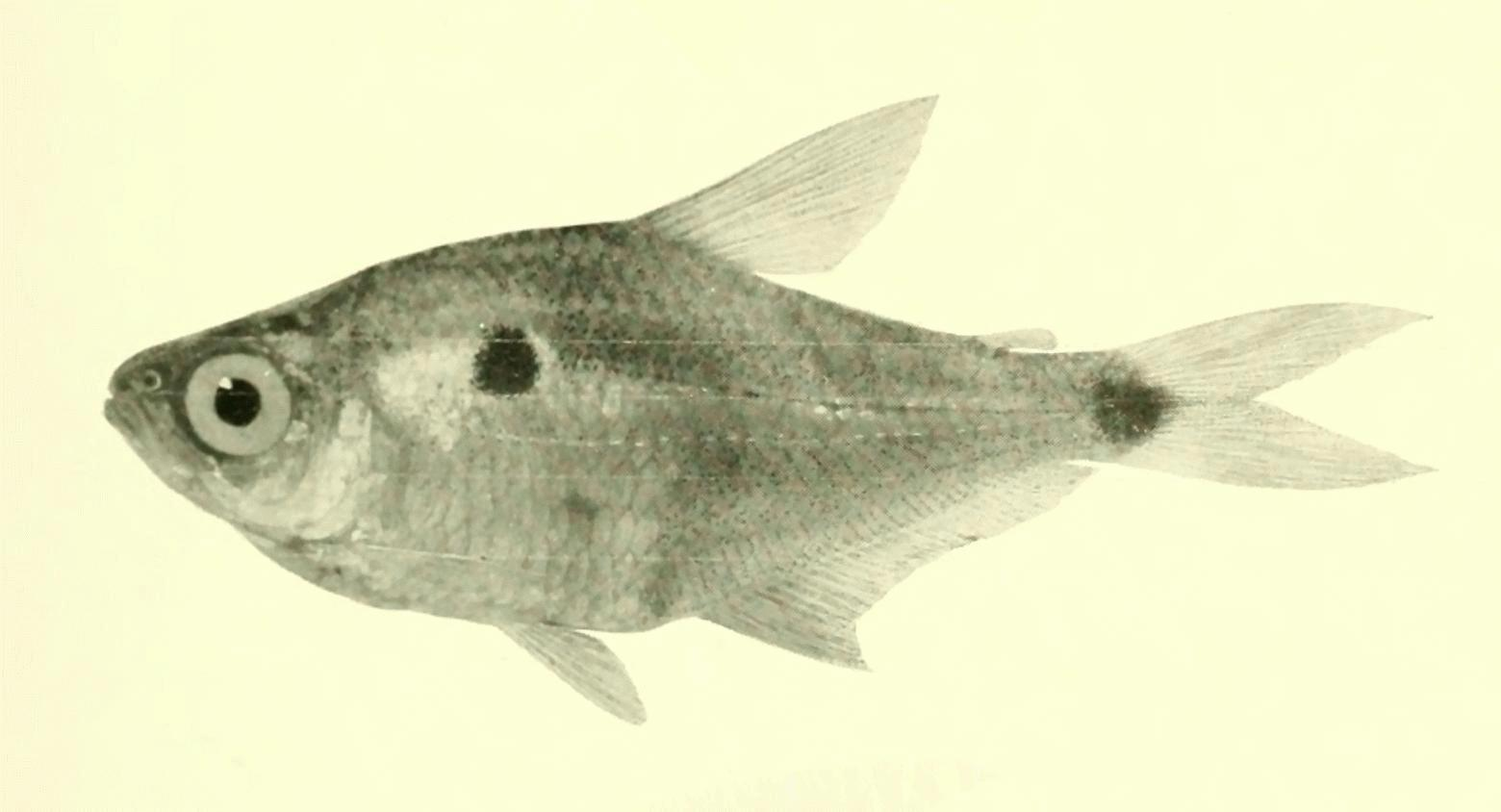

Scientific classification
- Kingdom: Animalia
- Phylum: Chordata
- Class: Actinopterygii
- Order: Characiformes
- Family: Characidae
- Subfamily: Characinae
- Genus: Phenacogaster; C. H. Eigenmann, 1907

Type species
- Tetragonopterus pectinatus Cope, 1870

Synonyms
- Vesicatrus C. H. Eigenmann, 1911; Grammabrycon Fowler, 1941

= Phenacogaster =

Genus of fishes

Phenacogaster is a genus of freshwater ray-finned fishes, characins, belonging to the family Characidae. The fishes in this genus are found in South America.

== Species ==
Phenacogaster contains the following valid species:

- Phenacogaster apletostigma Z. M. S. de Lucena & Gama, 2007
- Phenacogaster beni C. H. Eigenmann, 1911
- Phenacogaster calverti (Fowler, 1941)
- Phenacogaster capitulata Z. M. S. de Lucena & L. R. Malabarba, 2010
- Phenacogaster carteri (Norman, 1934)
- Phenacogaster eurytaenia Z. M. S. de Lucena, Antonetti & C. A S. de Lucena, 2018
- Phenacogaster franciscoensis C. H. Eigenmann, 1911
- Phenacogaster guayupe Romero-Figueroa & Carvalho, 2024
- Phenacogaster jancupa L. R. Malabarba & Z. M. S. de Lucena, 1995
- Phenacogaster julliae Z. M. S. de Lucena & C. A. S. de Lucena, 2019
- Phenacogaster lucenae Souza, Mattox, Vita, Ochoa, Melo & Oliveira, 2023
- Phenacogaster maculoblonga Z. M. S. de Lucena & L. R. Malabarba, 2010
- Phenacogaster megalosticta C. H. Eigenmann, 1909
- Phenacogaster microsticta C. H. Eigenmann, 1909
- Phenacogaster naevata Antonetti, C. A. S. de Lucena & Z. M. S. de Lucena, 2018
- Phenacogaster napoatilis Z. M. S. de Lucena & L. R. Malabarba, 2010
- Phenacogaster nukak Romero-Figueroa & Carvalho, 2024
- Phenacogaster ojitata Z. M. S. de Lucena & L. R. Malabarba, 2010
- Phenacogaster pectinata (Cope, 1870)
- Phenacogaster prolata Z. M. S. de Lucena & L. R. Malabarba, 2010
- Phenacogaster retropinnus Z. M. S. de Lucena & L. R. Malabarba, 2010
- Phenacogaster simulata Z. M. S. de Lucena & L. R. Malabarba, 2010
- Phenacogaster suborbitalis C. G. E. Ahl, 1936
- Phenacogaster tegatus (C. H. Eigenmann, 1911)
- Phenacogaster tukano Romero-Figueroa & Carvalho, 2024
- Phenacogaster wayampi Le Bail & Z. M. S. de Lucena, 2010
- Phenacogaster wayana Le Bail & Z. M. S. de Lucena, 2010
- Phenacogaster yari Romero-Figueroa & Carvalho, 2024
