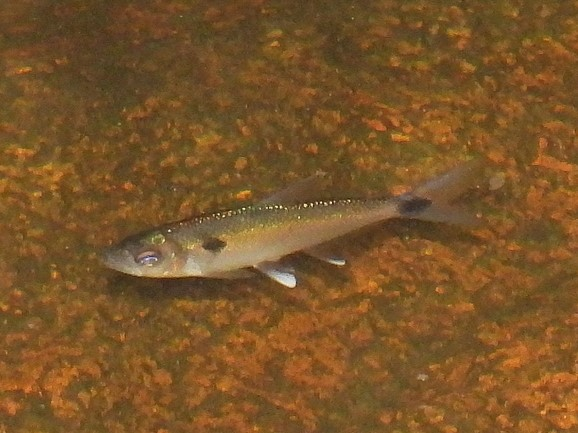
- Bryconexodon trombetasi

Scientific classification
- Kingdom: Animalia
- Phylum: Chordata
- Class: Actinopterygii
- Order: Characiformes
- Family: Characidae
- Subfamily: Exodontinae
- Genus: Bryconexodon; Géry, 1980

Type species
- Bryconexodon juruenae Géry, 1980

= Bryconexodon =

Genus of fishes

Bryconexodon is a genus of freshwater ray-finned fishes, characins, belonging to the family Characidae. The fishes in this genus are endemic to Brazil.

== Species ==
Bryconexodon contains the following valid species:

- Bryconexodon juruenae Géry, 1980
- Bryconexodon trombetasi Jégu, dos Santos & E. J. G. Ferreira, 1991
