= Paragoniates =

Conservation status
- Least Concern (IUCN 3.1)

Scientific classification
- Kingdom: Animalia
- Phylum: Chordata
- Class: Actinopterygii
- Order: Characiformes
- Family: Characidae
- Subfamily: Aphyocharacinae
- Genus: Paragoniates; Steindachner, 1876
- Species: P. alburnus

Binomial name
- Paragoniates alburnus Steindachner, 1876

Species of fish

Paragoniates is a monospecific genus of freshwater ray-finned fish belonging to the family Characidae. The only species in the genus is Paragoniates alburnus, a characin which is found in the Amazon River basin in Brazil, Bolivia, Peru and Venezuela.
