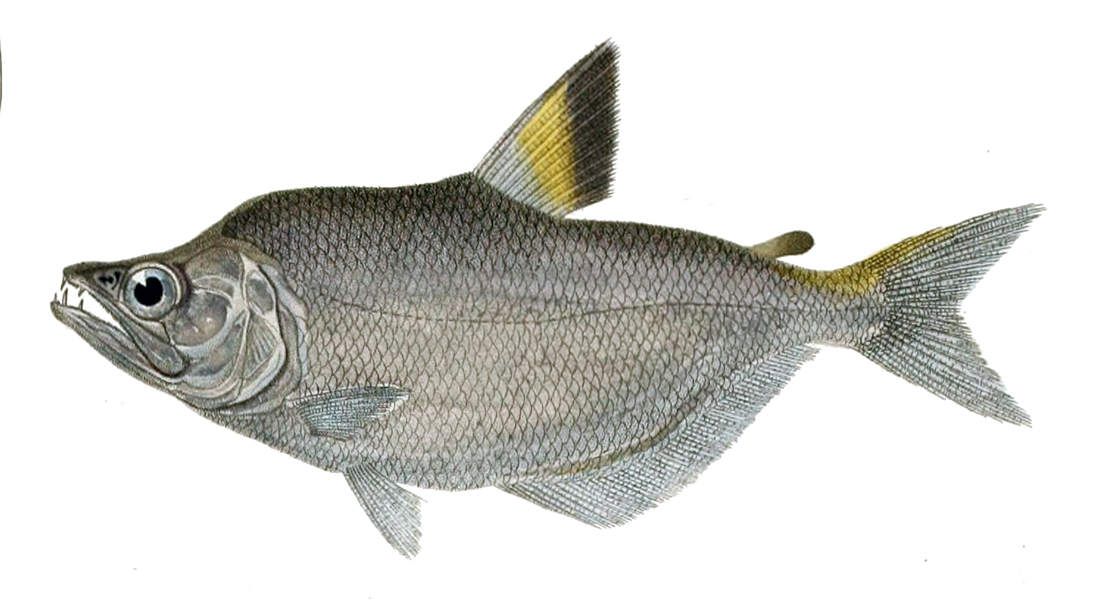
- Cynopotamus argenteus

Scientific classification
- Kingdom: Animalia
- Phylum: Chordata
- Class: Actinopterygii
- Order: Characiformes
- Family: Characidae
- Subfamily: Characinae
- Genus: Cynopotamus; Valenciennes, 1850

Type species
- Hydrocyon argenteus Valenciennes, 1847

Synonyms
- Cyrtocharax Fowler, 1907; Hybocharax Géry & Vu, 1963

= Cynopotamus =

Genus of fishes

Cynopotamus is a genus of freshwater ray-finned fishes, characins, belonging to the family Characidae. The fishes in this genus are found in South America

== Species ==
Cynopotamus contains the following valid species:

- Cynopotamus amazonum (Günther, 1868)
- Cynopotamus argenteus (Valenciennes, 1837)
- Cynopotamus atratoensis (C. H. Eigenmann, 1907)
- Cynopotamus bipunctatus Pellegrin, 1909
- Cynopotamus essequibensis C. H. Eigenmann, 1912
- Cynopotamus gouldingi Menezes, 1987
- Cynopotamus juruenae Menezes, 1987
- Cynopotamus kincaidi (Schultz, 1950)
- Cynopotamus magdalenae (Steindachner, 1879)
- Cynopotamus tocantinensis Menezes, 1987
- Cynopotamus venezuelae (Schultz, 1944)
