= Phenagoniates =

Conservation status
- Least Concern (IUCN 3.1)

Scientific classification
- Kingdom: Animalia
- Phylum: Chordata
- Class: Actinopterygii
- Order: Characiformes
- Family: Characidae
- Subfamily: Aphyocharacinae
- Genus: Phenagoniates; C. H. Eigenmann & C. E. Wilson, 1914
- Species: P. macrolepis

Binomial name
- Phenagoniates macrolepis (Meek & Hildebrand, 1913)

Synonyms
- Roeboides macrolepis Meek & hildebrand, 1913; Pheagoniates wilsoni C. H. Eigenmann & C.E. Wilson, 1914

Genus of fishes

Phenagoniates is a monospecific genus of freshwater ray-finned fish belonging to the family Characidae. The only species in the genus is Phenagoniates macrolepis, the barred glass tetra or slender tetra. This characin is found in Colombia, Panama and Venezuela.
