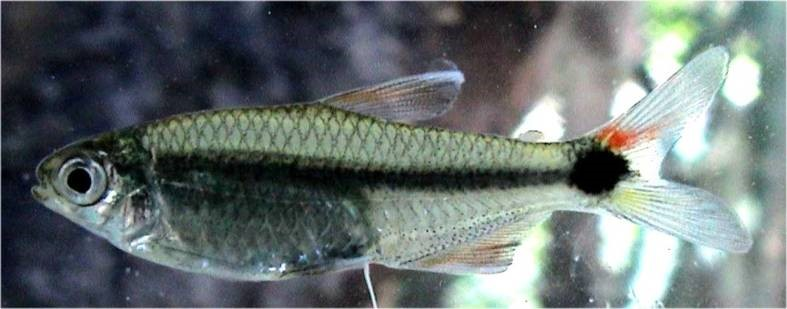
- Saccoderma hastata

Scientific classification
- Kingdom: Animalia
- Phylum: Chordata
- Class: Actinopterygii
- Order: Characiformes
- Family: Characidae
- Subfamily: Cheirodontinae
- Genus: Saccoderma; Schultz, 1944

Type species
- Saccoderma melanostigma Schultz, 1944

= Saccoderma =

Genus of fishes

Saccoderma is a genus of freshwater ray-finned fish, characins, belonging to the family Characidae. The fishes in this genus are found in Colombia and Venezuela.

== Species ==
Saccoderma contains the following valid species:

- Saccoderma hastata C. H. Eigenmann, 1913
- Saccoderma melanostigma Schultz, 1944

In addition, there are two taxa which are regarded as species inquirenda, S. falcata and S. robusta, both described by Georg Dahl in 1955.
