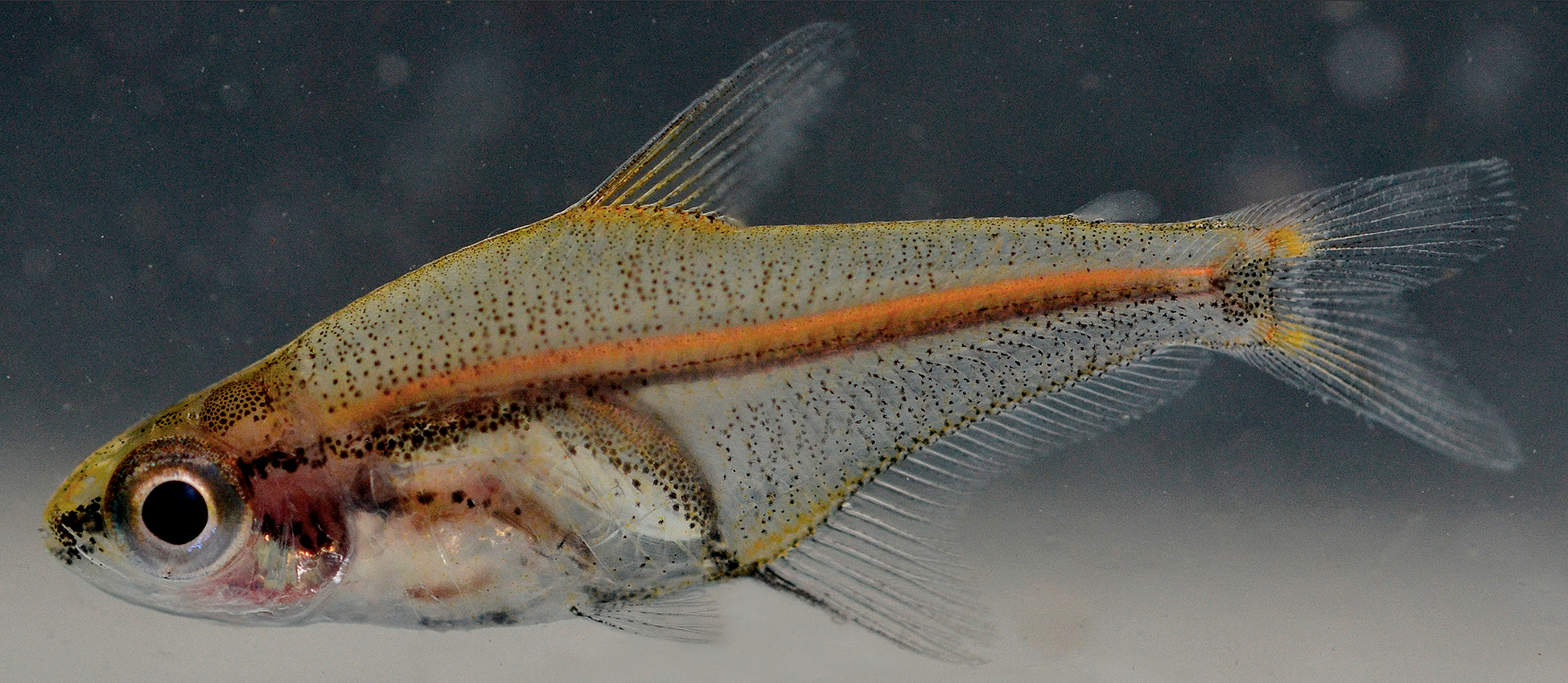
- Amazonichthys lindeae

Scientific classification
- Kingdom: Animalia
- Phylum: Chordata
- Class: Actinopterygii
- Order: Characiformes
- Family: Characidae
- Subfamily: Aphyocharacinae
- Genus: Amazonichthys; Esguícero & Mendonça, 2023

Type species
- Axelrodia lindeae Géry, 1973

Species
- see text

= Amazonichthys =

Genus of fishes

Amazonichthys is a genus of freshwater ray-finned fishes, characins belonging to the subfamily Aphyocharacinae within the family Characidae. The fishes in this genus are endemic to Brazil.

== Species ==
Amazonichthys contains the following valid species:

- Amazonichthys camelierae Esguícero & Mendonça, 2023
- Amazonichthys lindeae (Géry, 1973)
- Amazonichthys lu Esguícero & Mendonça, 2023
