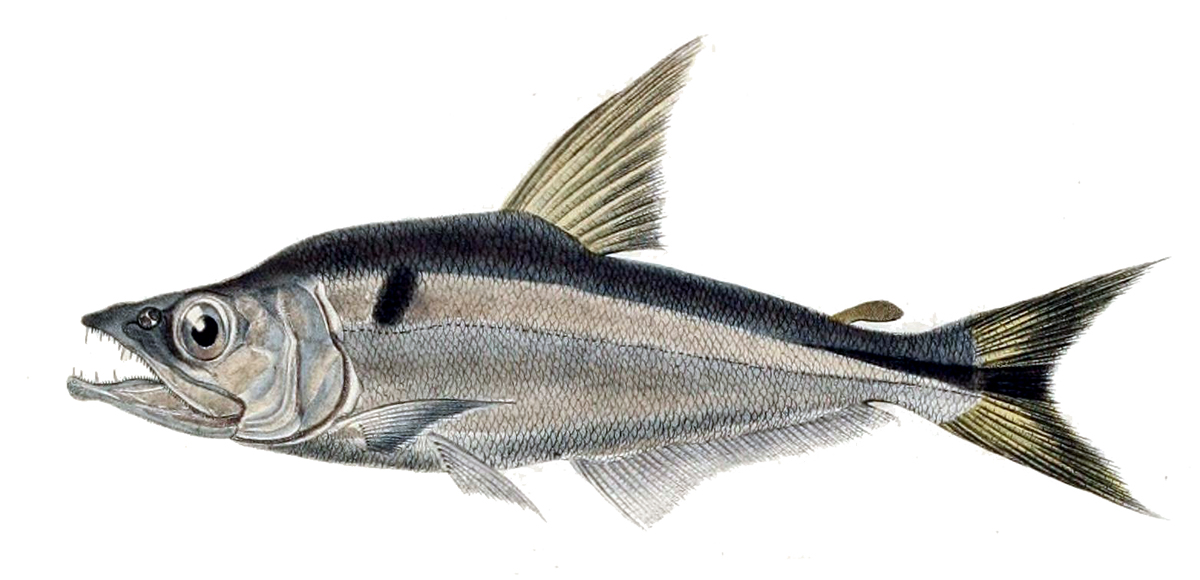
- Galeocharax humeralis

Scientific classification
- Kingdom: Animalia
- Phylum: Chordata
- Class: Actinopterygii
- Order: Characiformes
- Family: Characidae
- Subfamily: Characinae
- Genus: Galeocharax; Fowler, 1910

Type species
- Cynopotamus gulo Cope, 1870

= Galeocharax =

Genus of fishes

Galeocharax is a genus of freshwater ray-finned fishes, characins, belonging to the family Characidae. The fishes in this genus are found in South America.

== Species ==
Galeocharax contains the following valid species:

- Galeocharax goeldii (Fowler, 1913)
- Galeocharax gulo (Cope, 1870)
- Galeocharax humeralis (Valenciennes, 1834)
