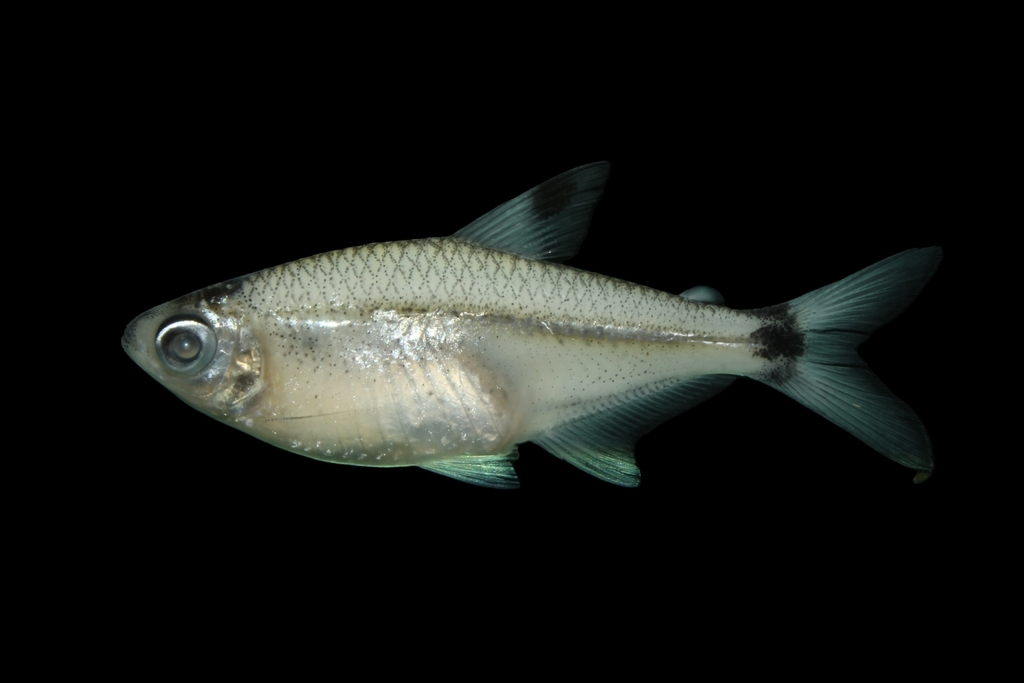
- Corumbá, Mato Grosso do Sul

Conservation status
- Least Concern (IUCN 3.1)

Scientific classification
- Kingdom: Animalia
- Phylum: Chordata
- Class: Actinopterygii
- Order: Characiformes
- Family: Characidae
- Subfamily: Cheirodontinae
- Genus: Holoshesthes; C. H. Eigenmann, 1903
- Species: H. pequira

Binomial name
- Holoshesthes pequira (Steindachner, 1882)

Synonyms
- Genus: Holesthes C.H. Eigenmann, 1915; Species: Chirodon pequira Steindachner, 1882; Odontostilbe pequira (Steindachner, 1882); Odontostilbe trementinae C. H. Eigenmann & C. H. Kennedy, 1903

= Holoshesthes =

Genus of fishes

Holoshesthes is a monospecific genus of freshwater ray-finned fish belonging to the family Characidae. The only species in this genus is Holoshesthes pequira, a characin, found in South America.

== Taxonomy ==
Holoshesthes was first proposed as a monospecific genus in 1903 by the German-born American ichthyologist Carl H. Eigenmann, with Chirodon pequira designated as its type species. Eigenmann later emended this to Holesthes, but this is now regarded as an unjustified emendation under Article 32.5 of the International Code of Zoological Nomenclature. Chirodon pequira was first formally described in 1882 by the Austrian ichthyologist Franz Steindachner, with its type locality given as the Guaporé River in the Amazon basin of Brazil. Some authorities regard this taxon as being within the genus Odontostilbe. This taxon is classified in the subfamily Cheirodontinae, which is classified within the family Characidae in the order Characiformes.

== Etymology ==
Holoshesthes combines hólos, meaning "whole" or "entire", and esthḗs, which means "dress", "clothing" or "raiment", a reference to the maxillaries having teeth along its entire edge, so it is "clothed in teeth". The specific name, pequira, was not explained by Steindachner, but it may be a local name used for this fish in Brazil. This was first used by Johann Natterer as Salmo pequira for a museum specimen. Natterer collected the holotype of this species.

== Description ==
Holoshesthes pequira has a maximum standard length of 5.6 cm (2.2 in).

== Distribution and habitat ==
Holoshesthes pequira has a wide distribution in the Southern Cone of South America, where it occurs in the basins of the Paraguay River, the lower Paraná River and the Uruguay River in Argentina, Bolivia, Brazil, Paraguay and Uruguay. These fish prefer shallow, eutrophic parts of rivers and streams. They are also found in lakes on the floodplains.
