= Pseudocheirodon =

Scientific classification
- Kingdom: Animalia
- Phylum: Chordata
- Class: Actinopterygii
- Order: Characiformes
- Family: Characidae
- Subfamily: Cheirodontinae
- Genus: Pseudocheirodon; Meek & Hildebrand, 1916

Type species
- Pseudocheirodon affinis (a synonym of Pseudocheirodon arnoldi) Meek & Hildebrand, 1916

Genus of fishes

Pseudocheirodon is a genus of freshwater ray-finned fish, characins, belonging to the family Characidae. The fishes in this genus are found in southern Central America. There are currently two described species in this genus.

== Species ==
Pseudocheirodon contains the following vaild species:

- Pseudocheirodon arnoldi (Boulenger, 1909)
- Pseudocheirodon terrabae W. A. Bussing, 1967
