= Roeboexodon =

Conservation status
- Least Concern (IUCN 3.1)

Scientific classification
- Kingdom: Animalia
- Phylum: Chordata
- Class: Actinopterygii
- Order: Characiformes
- Family: Characidae
- Subfamily: Exodontinae
- Genus: Roeboexodon; Géry, 1959
- Species: R. guyanensis

Binomial name
- Roeboexodon guyanensis (Puyo, 1948)

Synonyms
- Genus: Gnathoplax Myers, 1960; Species: Exodon guyanensis Puyo, 1948; Roeboexodon geryi Myers, 1960

Genus of fishes

Roeboexodon is a monospecific genus of freshwater ray-finned fish belonging to the family Characidae, within the subfamily Exodontinae, the toothy or lepidiphagous characins. The only species in this genus is Roeboexodon guyanensis, a species which is found in South America where it occurs in clear water rivers with sandy bottoms in Brazil, French Guiana and Suriname. This lepidophagous species has a maximum standard length of 12 cm (4.7 in).
