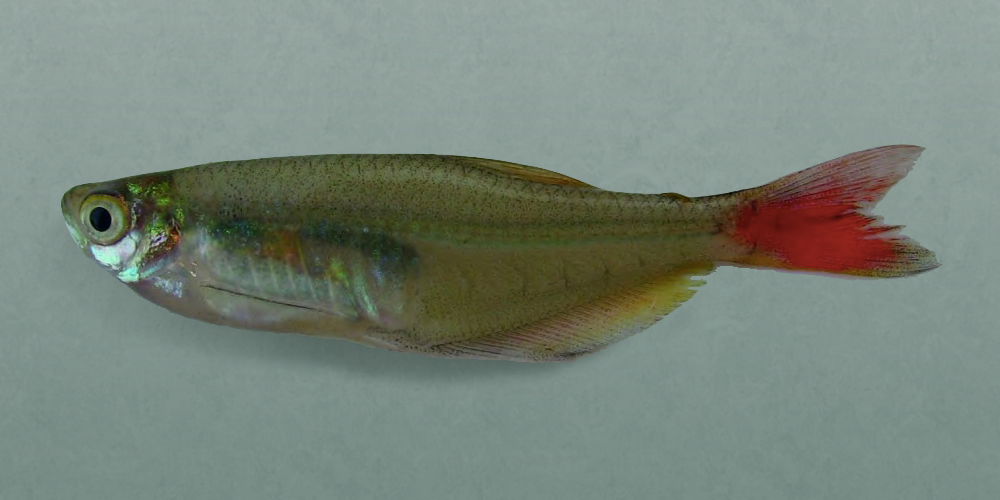

Conservation status
- Least Concern (IUCN 3.1)

Scientific classification
- Kingdom: Animalia
- Phylum: Chordata
- Class: Actinopterygii
- Order: Characiformes
- Family: Characidae
- Genus: Prionobrama
- Species: P. paraguayensis

Binomial name
- Prionobrama paraguayensis (C. H. Eigenmann, 1914)

Synonyms
- Bleptonema paraguayensis C. H. Eigenmann, 1914

= Prionobrama paraguayensis =

Speciesof fish

Prionobrama paraguayensis is a species of freshwater ray-finned fish, a characin, belonging to the family Characidae. This species is found in the Paraguay River and lower Paraná River basins in Argentina, Bolivia, Brazil and Paraguay. It is a small fish with a maximum total length of 5 cm (2.0 in).
