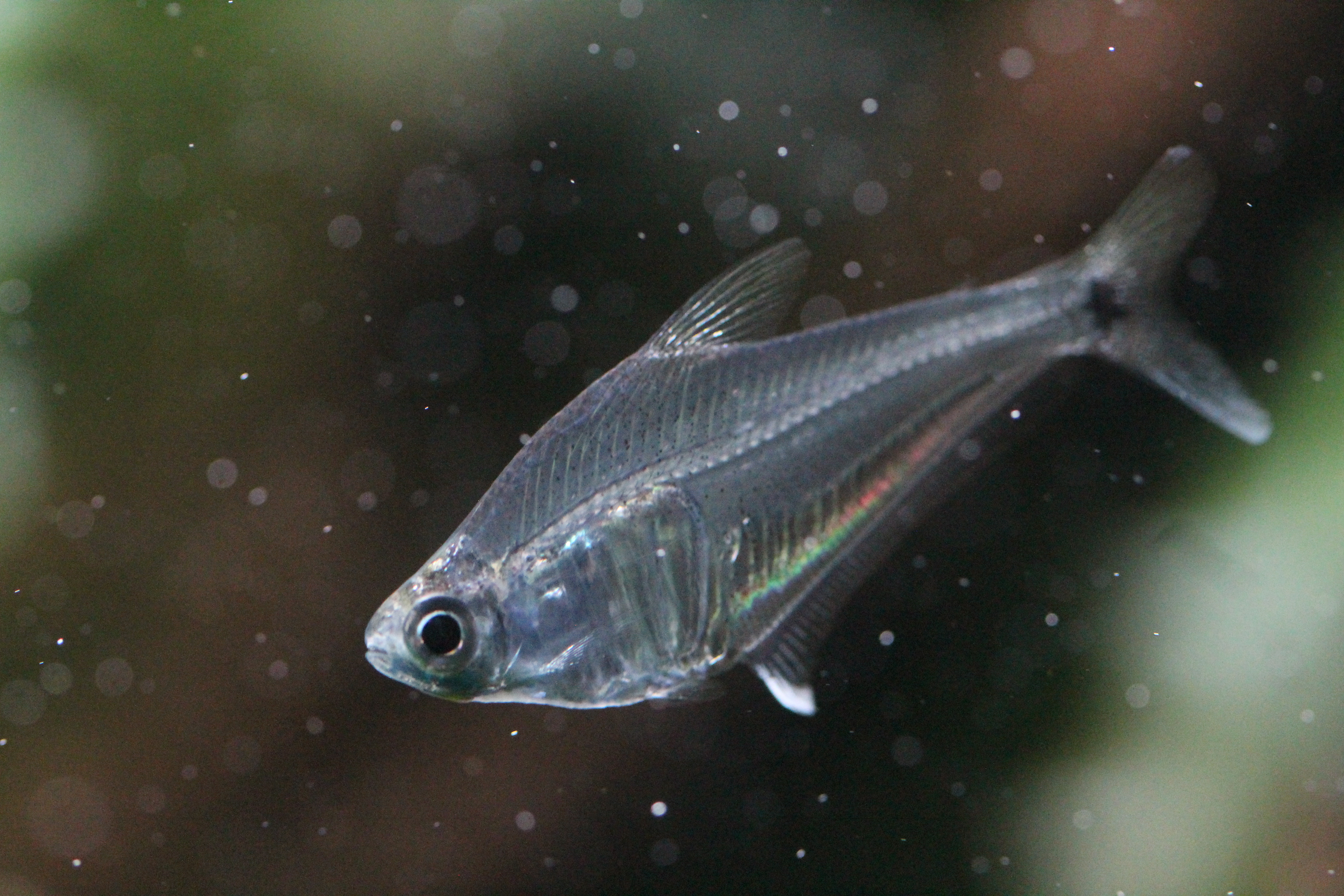

Conservation status
- Least Concern (IUCN 3.1)

Scientific classification
- Kingdom: Animalia
- Phylum: Chordata
- Class: Actinopterygii
- Order: Characiformes
- Family: Characidae
- Subfamily: Cheirodontinae
- Genus: Protocheirodon; Vari, B. F. Melo & C. de Oliveira, 2016
- Species: P. pi

Binomial name
- Protocheirodon pi (Vari, 1978)

Synonyms
- Leptagoniates pi Vari, 1978

= Protocheirodon =

Genus of fishes

Protocheirodon is a monospecific genus of freshwater ray-finned fish belonging to the family Characidae. The only species in the genus is Protocheirodon pi, a characin found in Amazonas-Solimões, Purus, Madeira and Ucayali rivers.
