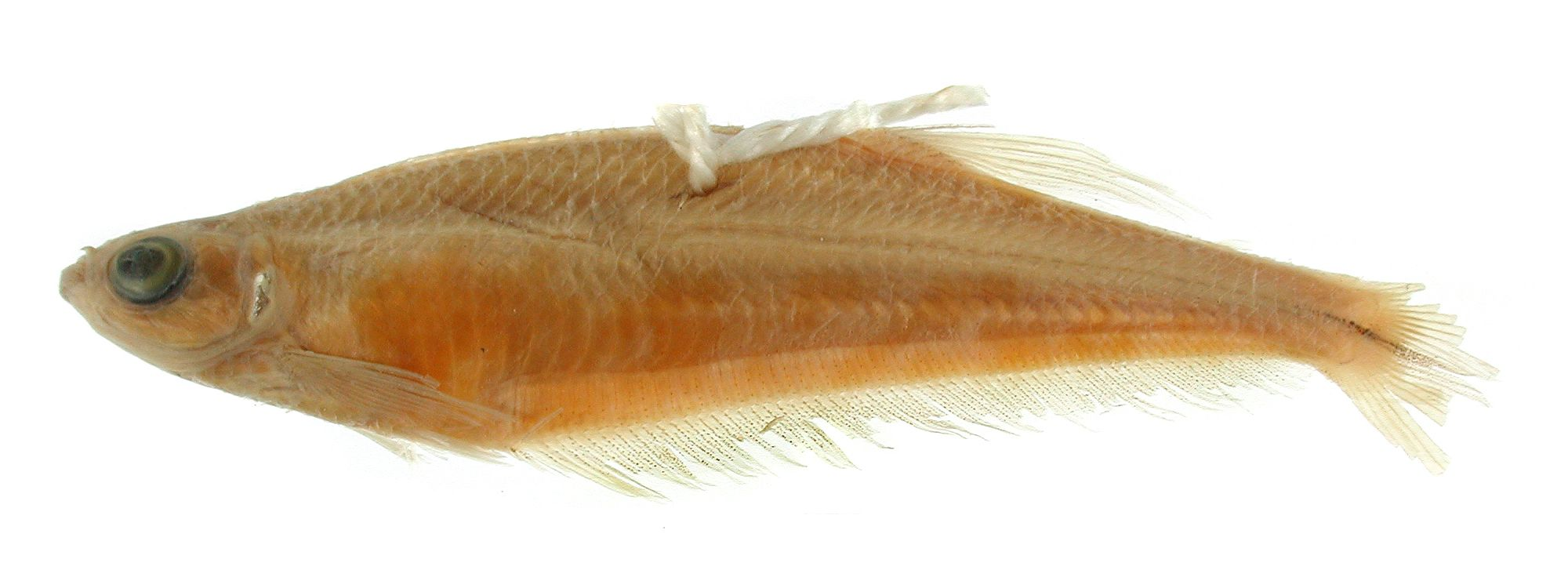
- preserved specimen

Conservation status
- Least Concern (IUCN 3.1)

Scientific classification
- Kingdom: Animalia
- Phylum: Chordata
- Class: Actinopterygii
- Order: Characiformes
- Family: Characidae
- Subfamily: Aphyocharacinae
- Genus: Xenagoniates; G. S. Myers, 1942
- Species: X. bondi

Binomial name
- Xenagoniates bondi G. S. Myers, 1942

= Long-finned glass tetra =

Species of fish

The long-finned glass tetra (Xenagoniates bondi) is a species of freshwater ray-finned fish, a characin, belonging to the family Characidae. It is the only species in the monospecific genus Xenogoniates, which is classified in the subfamily Aphyocharacinae, the glass tetras. This species is found in the Orinoco basin and other river systems in Venezuela and Colombia. It has a maximum standard length of 6 cm (2.4 in).
