= Spintherobolus =

Scientific classification
- Kingdom: Animalia
- Phylum: Chordata
- Class: Actinopterygii
- Order: Characiformes
- Family: Spintherobolidae
- Genus: Spintherobolus; C. H. Eigenmann, 1911

Type species
- Spintherobolus papilliferus C. H. Eigenmann, 1911

Genus of fish

Spintherobolus is a genus of freshwater ray-finned fish belonging to the family Spintherobolidae, the piquiras. These fishes are endemic to river basins in southern and southeastern Brazil from Santa Catarina to Rio de Janeiro. All four species in the genus are considered threatened by Brazil's Ministry of the Environment. They are small fish, up to 6.1 cm (2.4 in) in standard length.

== Species ==
Spintherobolus contains the following species:

- Spintherobolus ankoseion S. H. Weitzman & L. R. Malabarba, 1999
- Spintherobolus broccae G. S. Myers, 1925
- Spintherobolus leptoura S. H. Weitzman & L. R. Malabarba, 1999
- Spintherobolus papilliferus C. H. Eigenmann, 1911
