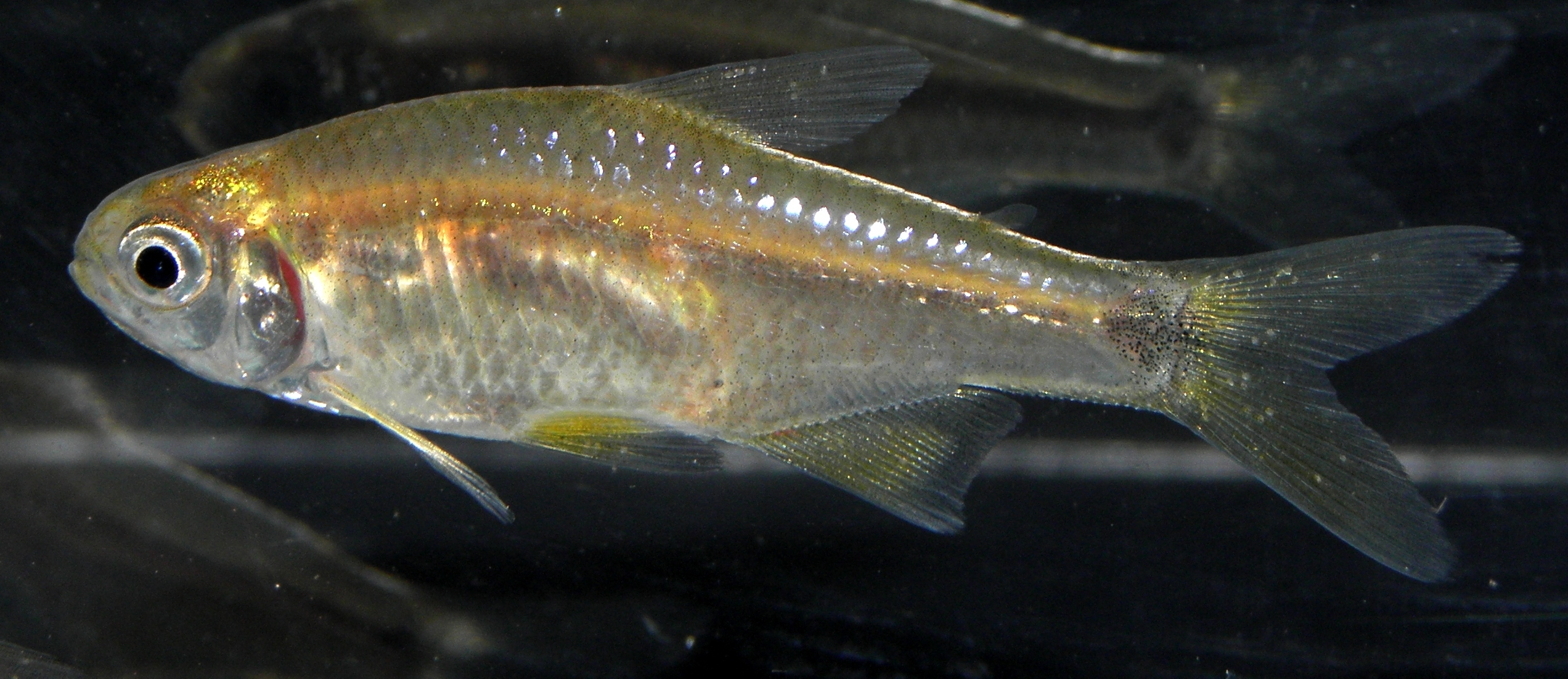
- Cheirodon interruptus

Scientific classification
- Kingdom: Animalia
- Phylum: Chordata
- Class: Actinopterygii
- Order: Characiformes
- Family: Characidae
- Subfamily: Cheirodontinae
- Genus: Cheirodon; Girard, 1855

Type species
- Cheirodon pisciculus Girard, 1855

Synonyms
- Pedalibrycon Fowler, 1943

= Cheirodon =

Genus of fishes

Cheirodon is a genus of freshwater ray-finned fishes, characins, belonging to the family Characidae. The fishes in this genus occur in South America. Of the current species assigned to this genus, one, C. jaguaribensis, is placed here as a convenience, as its actual position in Characidae is unknown, or incertae sedis. Four species from this genus are endemic to southern Chile and are the only living species within the Characiformes found in the southern part of South America, west of the Andes.

== Species ==
Cheirodon contains the following valid species:

- Cheirodon australis C. H. Eigenmann, 1928
- Cheirodon galusdae C. H. Eigenmann, 1928
- Cheirodon ibicuhiensis C. H. Eigenmann, 1915
- Cheirodon interruptus (Jenyns, 1842)
- Cheirodon kiliani Campos, 1982
- Cheirodon parahybae C. H. Eigenmann, 1915
- Cheirodon pisciculus Girard, 1855
- Cheirodon stenodon C. H. Eigenmann, 1915

In addition, four species, C. jaguaribensis, C. luelingi, C. macropterus and C. ortegai, are listed as species inquirenda, i.e. of uncertain status, by Eschmeyer's Catalog of Fishes.
