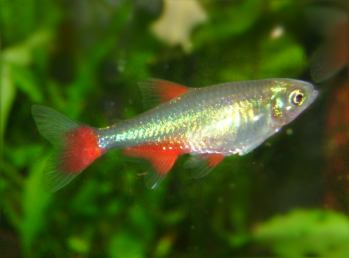
- Bloodfin tetra (Aphyocharax anisitsi)

Scientific classification
- Kingdom: Animalia
- Phylum: Chordata
- Class: Actinopterygii
- Order: Characiformes
- Family: Characidae
- Subfamily: Aphyocharacinae; C. H. Eigenmann, 1909

Type genus
- Aphyocharax Günther, 1868

Genera
- see text

= Aphyocharacinae =

Subfamily of freshwater fishes

Aphyocharacinae is a subfamily of freshwater ray-finned fishes, characins, belonging to the family Characidae. The fishes in this subfamily are referred to as glass characins. The fishes included in this subfamily are found in South America, mainly in the basins of the Amazon and Orinoco rivers, with some species extending to the west of the Andes, and others as far south as the Paraguay River. The taxa within this subfamily have an apomorphy of having two dorsal fin rays attached to the first dorsal pterygiophore.

== Genera ==
Aphyocharacinae contains the following genera:

- Amazonichthys Esguícero & Mendonça, 2023
- Aphyocharacidium Géry, 1960
- Aphyocharax Günther, 1868
- Cyanogaster Mattox, Britz, Toledo-Piza & Marinho, 2013
- Leptagoniates Boulenger, 1887
- Paragoniates Steindachner, 1876
- Phenagoniates C. H. Eigenmann & C. B. Wilson, 1914
- Prionobrama Fowler, 1913
- Xenagoniates Myers, 1942
