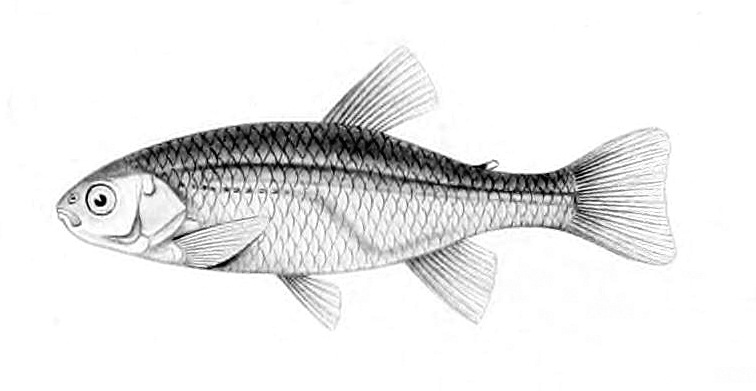
- Cheirodon pisciculus

Scientific classification
- Kingdom: Animalia
- Phylum: Chordata
- Class: Actinopterygii
- Order: Characiformes
- Family: Characidae
- Subfamily: Cheirodontinae; C. H. Eigenmann, 1915

Type genus
- Cheirodon Girard, 1855

Genera
- see text

= Cheirodontinae =

Subfamily of fishes

Cheirodontinae is a subfamily of freshwater ray-finned fishes, characins, belonging to the family Characidae. The fishes in this genus are found in the Neotropics as far north as Costa Rica and in South America. They are absent from the Pacific drainages of South America except for four species in the genus Cheirodon that are endemic to southern Chile. Some authorities split this subfamily into two tribes, Cheirodontini and Composurini, based on the males' reproductive characteristics. However, later phylogenetic studies found Cheirodontinae to be monophyletic but that the division onto two tribes was not supported.

== Genera ==
Cheirodontinae contains the following genera:

- Acinocheirodon Malabarba & Weitzman, 1999
- Amblystilbe Fowler, 1940
- Aphyocheirodon C. H. Eigenmann, 1915
- Cheirodon Girard, 1855
- Cheirodontops Schultz, 1944
- Compsura C. H. Eigenmann, 1915
- Ctenocheirodon Malabarba & Jerep, 2012
- Heterocheirodon Malabarba, 1998
- Holoshesthes C. H. Eigenmann, 1903
- Kolpotocheirodon Malabarba & Weitzman, 2000
- Macropsobrycon C. H. Eigenmann, 1915
- Nanocheirodon Malabarba, 1998
- Odontostilbe Cope, 1870
- Prodontocharax C. H. Eigenmann & Pearson, 1924
- Protocheirodon Vari, Melo & Oliveira, 2016
- Pseudocheirodon Meek & Hildebrand, 1916
- Saccoderma Schultz, 1944
- Serrapinnus Malabarba, 1998
