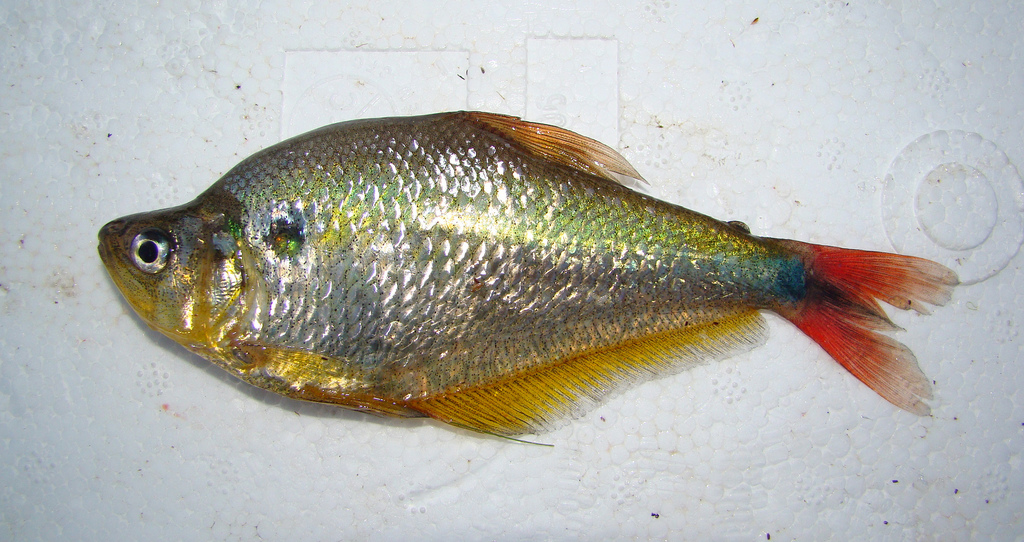
- Charax stenopterus

Scientific classification
- Kingdom: Animalia
- Phylum: Chordata
- Class: Actinopterygii
- Order: Characiformes
- Suborder: Characoidei
- Family: Characidae; Latreille, 1825

Type genus
- Charax Scopoli, 1777

Subfamilies
- Aphyocharacinae; Characinae; Cheirodontinae; Exodontinae; Tetragonopterinae

= Characidae =

Family of fishes

Characidae, the characids, is a family of freshwater subtropical and tropical fish belonging to the order Characiformes. They are found throughout much of Central and South America, including such major waterways as the Amazon and Orinoco Rivers. These fish vary in length; many are less than 3 cm (1.2 in).

The name "characins" is a historical one, but scientists today tend to prefer "characids" to reflect their status as a, by and large, monophyletic group (at family rank). This family includes some of the first characiforms to be described to science, such as Charax and Tetragonopterus, and thus lend their name to the order, as well as to common names such as "characin" and "tetra".

Past taxonomic treatments had a much more expansive definition of the family, including numerous South American fish families such as the piranhas and dorados, as well as the African alestids. Following multiple taxonomic revisions, this was eventually restricted to just the American "tetra" type characins by the 2010s. However, even this definition of Characidae was found to obscure much of the evolutionary diversity within the group, and in 2024 the "tetra" families Acestrorhamphidae and Stevardiidae were split out of the Characidae, leaving it with just five subfamilies.

== Classification ==
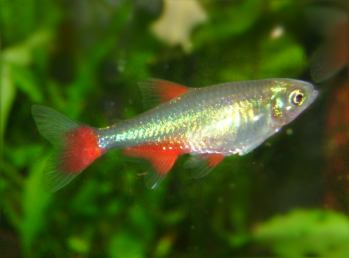
Aphyocharax anisitsi (Aphyocharacinae)

=== Taxonomy ===
The following classification is based on Eschmeyer's Catalog of Fishes (2025):

Family Characidae

- Subfamily Aphyocharacinae C. H. Eigenmann, 1909
  - Amazonichthys Esguícero & Mendonça, 2023
  - Aphyocharacidium Géry, 1960
  - Aphyocharax Günther, 1868
  - Cyanogaster Mattox, Britz, Toledo-Piza & Marinho, 2013
  - Leptagoniates Boulenger, 1887
  - Paragoniates Steindachner, 1876
  - Phenagoniates C. H. Eigenmann & C. B. Wilson, 1914
  - Prionobrama Fowler, 1913
  - Xenagoniates Myers, 1942
- Subfamily Cheirodontinae C. H. Eigenmann, 1915
  - Acinocheirodon Malabarba & Weitzman, 1999
  - Amblystilbe Fowler, 1940
  - Aphyocheirodon C. H. Eigenmann, 1915
  - Cheirodon Girard, 1855
  - Cheirodontops Schultz, 1944
  - Compsura C. H. Eigenmann, 1915
  - Ctenocheirodon Malabarba & Jerep, 2012
  - Heterocheirodon Malabarba, 1998
  - Holoshesthes C. H. Eigenmann, 1903
  - Kolpotocheirodon Malabarba & Weitzman, 2000
  - Macropsobrycon C. H. Eigenmann, 1915
  - Nanocheirodon Malabarba, 1998
  - Odontostilbe Cope, 1870
  - Prodontocharax C. H. Eigenmann & Pearson, 1924
  - Protocheirodon Vari, Melo & Oliveira, 2016
  - Pseudocheirodon Meek & Hildebrand, 1916
  - Saccoderma Schultz, 1944
  - Serrapinnus Malabarba 1998
- Subfamily Exodontinae Fowler, 1958
  - Bryconexodon Géry, 1980
  - Exodon Müller & Troschel, 1844
  - Roeboexodon Géry, 1959
- Subfamily Tetragonopterinae Gill, 1858
  - Tetragonopterus Cuvier, 1816
- Subfamily Characinae Latreille, 1825
  - Acanthocharax C. H. Eigenmann, 1912
  - Acestrocephalus C. H. Eigenmann, 1910
  - Atopomesus Myers, 1927
  - Charax Scopoli, 1777
  - Cynopotamus Valenciennes, 1850
  - Galeocharax Fowler, 1910
  - Microschemobrycon C. H. Eigenmann, 1915
  - Phenacogaster C. H. Eigenmann, 1907
  - Roeboides Günther 1864

=== Former members ===
Phylogeny of Characidae from Melo et al. 2015 with clade names from van der Laan 2017.

- Characidae
  - Spintherobolus clade (=Spintherobolidae)
  - - Stethaprioninae (=Acestrorhamphidae)
    - - Stevardiinae (=Stevardiidae)
      - Characinae (=Characidae)
        - - Aphyocharacini
          - - Cheirodontini
            - Compsurini
        - - Exodontini
          - - Tetragonopterini
            - Characini

This family has undergone a large amount of systematic and taxonomic change. More recent revision has moved many former members of the family into their own related but distinct families – the pencilfishes of the genus Nannostomus are a typical example, having now been moved into the Lebiasinidae, the assorted predatory species belonging to Hoplias and Hoplerythrinus have now been moved into the Erythrinidae, and the sabre-toothed fishes of the genus Hydrolycus have been moved into the Cynodontidae. The former subfamily Alestiinae was promoted to family level (Alestiidae) and the subfamilies Crenuchinae and Characidiinae were moved to the family Crenuchidae.

Other fish families that were formerly classified as members of the Characidae, but which were moved into separate families of their own during recent taxonomic revisions (after 1994) include Acestrorhynchidae, Anostomidae, Chilodidae, Citharinidae, Ctenoluciidae, Curimatidae, Distichodontidae, Gasteropelecidae, Hemiodontidae, Hepsetidae, Parodontidae, Prochilodontidae, Serrasalmidae, and Triportheidae. In 2024, the families Stevardiidae and Acestrorhamphidae, containing a high proportion of the famous ornamental aquarium tetras, were also split out of the family, in addition to the small family Spintherobolidae.
