= Denticetopsis iwokrama =

Conservation status
- Least Concern (IUCN 3.1)

Scientific classification
- Kingdom: Animalia
- Phylum: Chordata
- Class: Actinopterygii
- Order: Siluriformes
- Family: Cetopsidae
- Genus: Denticetopsis
- Species: D. iwokrama

Binomial name
- Denticetopsis iwokrama Vari, Ferraris & de Pinna, 2005

Species of fish

Denticetopsis iwokrama is a species of freshwater ray-finned fish belonging to the family Cetopsidae, the whale catfishes. This fish is endemic to Guyana where it is only known from the type locality in the Siparuni River basin and from the Kuyuwini River. This benthopelagic species grows to a standard length of 4.3 cm (1.7 in).
