= Cetopsidium roae =

Conservation status
- Least Concern (IUCN 3.1)

Scientific classification
- Kingdom: Animalia
- Phylum: Chordata
- Class: Actinopterygii
- Order: Siluriformes
- Family: Cetopsidae
- Genus: Cetopsidium
- Species: C. roae

Binomial name
- Cetopsidium roae Vari, Ferraris & de Pinna, 2005

Species of fish

Cetopsidium roae is a species of freshwater ray-finned fish belonging to the family Cetopsidae, the whale catfishes. This fish is found in the upper stream of the Essequibo region in south-western Guyana, in the Rupununi basin, and upper Takutu River on the frontier of Guyana and Brazil.
