= Denticetopsis macilenta =

Conservation status
- Least Concern (IUCN 3.1)

Scientific classification
- Kingdom: Animalia
- Phylum: Chordata
- Class: Actinopterygii
- Order: Siluriformes
- Family: Cetopsidae
- Genus: Denticetopsis
- Species: D. macilenta

Binomial name
- Denticetopsis macilenta (C. H. Eigenmann, 1912)

Synonyms
- Hemicetopsis macilentus C. H. Eigenmann, 1912; Pseudocetopsis macilentus (C. H. Eigenmann, 1912)

Species of fish

Denticetopsis macilenta is a species of freshwater ray-finned fish belonging to the family Cetopsidae, the whale catfishes. This fish is endemic to Guyana where it is only known from a limited area in the Essequibo River basin. This demersal fish grows to a standard length of 6.7 cm (2.6 in).
