= Cetopsidium morenoi =

Conservation status
- Least Concern (IUCN 3.1)

Scientific classification
- Kingdom: Animalia
- Phylum: Chordata
- Class: Actinopterygii
- Order: Siluriformes
- Family: Cetopsidae
- Genus: Cetopsidium
- Species: C. morenoi

Binomial name
- Cetopsidium morenoi (Fernández-Yépez, 1972)

Synonyms
- Hemicetopsis morenoi Fernández-Yépez, 1972; Pseudocetopsis morenoi (Fernández-Yépez, 1972)

Species of fish

Cetopsidium morenoi is a species of whale catfish that isis a species of freshwater ray-finned fish belonging to the family Cetopsidae, the whale catfishes. This fish is found in the central and western portions of the Orinoco River basin in Venezuela and Colombia.
