= Helogenes castaneus =

Conservation status
- Least Concern (IUCN 3.1)

Scientific classification
- Kingdom: Animalia
- Phylum: Chordata
- Class: Actinopterygii
- Order: Siluriformes
- Family: Cetopsidae
- Genus: Helogenes
- Species: H. castaneus

Binomial name
- Helogenes castaneus (Dahl, 1960)

Synonyms
- Leyvaichthys castaneus Dahl, 1960

Species of fish

Helogenes castaneus is a species of freshwater ray-finned fishes belonging to the family Cetopsidae, the whale catfishes. This species is endemic to Colombia, where it is found in the Guaviare River and Meta River drainages of the upper Orinoco River. This species grows to a standard length of 4.7 cm (1.9 in).
