= Denticetopsis royeroi =

Conservation status
- Data Deficient (IUCN 3.1)

Scientific classification
- Kingdom: Animalia
- Phylum: Chordata
- Class: Actinopterygii
- Order: Siluriformes
- Family: Cetopsidae
- Genus: Denticetopsis
- Species: D. royeroi

Binomial name
- Denticetopsis royeroi Ferraris, 1996

Species of fish

Denticetopsis royeroi is a species of freshwater ray-finned fish belonging to the family Cetopsidae, the whale catfishes. This fish is endemic to Venezuela where it is only known from the holotype collected in a tributary to the upper Rio Negro. This demersal fish grows to a standard length of 1.8 cm (0.71 in).
