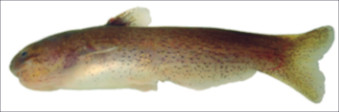
- 50 mm

Conservation status
- Least Concern (IUCN 3.1)

Scientific classification
- Kingdom: Animalia
- Phylum: Chordata
- Class: Actinopterygii
- Order: Siluriformes
- Family: Cetopsidae
- Genus: Denticetopsis
- Species: D. seducta

Binomial name
- Denticetopsis seducta Vari, Ferraris & de Pinna, 2005

= Denticetopsis seducta =

Species of fish

Denticetopsis seducta is a species of freshwater ray-finned fishes belonging to the family Cetopsidae, the whale catfishes. This species is endemic to Brazil where it has a relatively wide, albeit scattered, distribution in the central and western portions of the Amazon basin and possibly the southwestern portions of the Orinoco River basin; it is relatively disjunct from the other species of Denticetopsis. This demersal fish grows to a standard length of 5.1 cm (2.0 in).
