= Cetopsidium minutum =

Conservation status
- Least Concern (IUCN 3.1)

Scientific classification
- Kingdom: Animalia
- Phylum: Chordata
- Class: Actinopterygii
- Order: Siluriformes
- Family: Cetopsidae
- Genus: Cetopsidium
- Species: C. minutum

Binomial name
- Cetopsidium minutum (C. H. Eigenmann, 1912)

Synonyms
- Hemicetopsis minutus Eigenmann, 1912; Pseudocetopsis minuta (Eigenmann, 1912)

Species of fish

Cetopsidium minutum is a species of freshwater ray-finned fish belonging to the family Cetopsidae, the whale catfishes. This fish is endemic to Guyana.
