= Denticetopsis praecox =

Conservation status
- Least Concern (IUCN 3.1)

Scientific classification
- Kingdom: Animalia
- Phylum: Chordata
- Class: Actinopterygii
- Order: Siluriformes
- Family: Cetopsidae
- Genus: Denticetopsis
- Species: D. praecox

Binomial name
- Denticetopsis praecox (Ferraris & B. A. Brown, 1991)

Synonyms
- Pseudocetopsis praecox Ferraris & Brown, 1991

Species of fish

Denticetopsis praecox is a species of freshwater ray-finned fish belonging to the family Cetopsidae, the whale catfishes. This fish is endemic to Venezuela where it is known from the Baria River of the upper Rio Negro basin. This demersal fish grows to a standard length of 5.3 cm (2.1 in).
