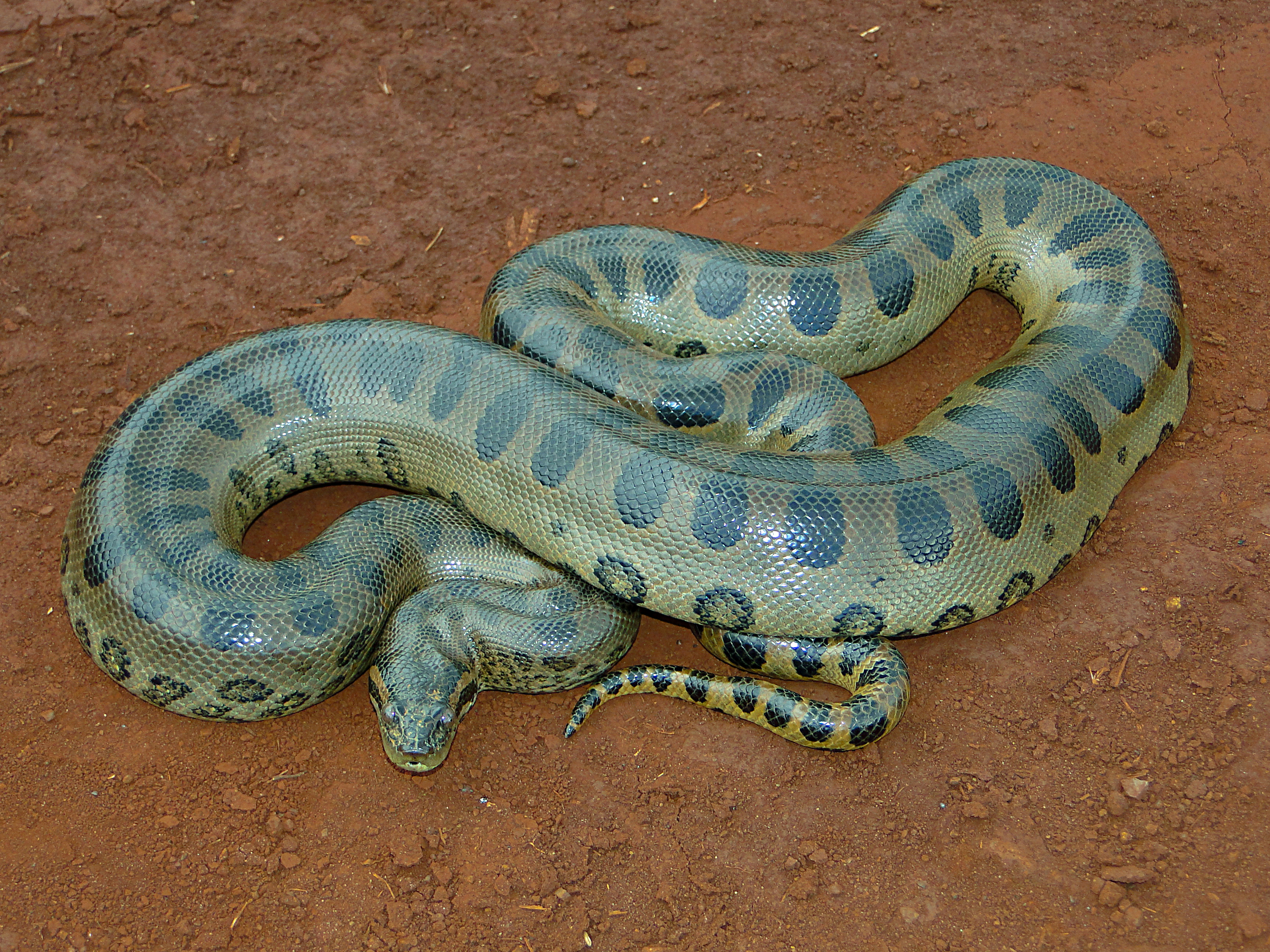

Conservation status
- Least Concern (IUCN 3.1)
- CITES Appendix II

Scientific classification
- Kingdom: Animalia
- Phylum: Chordata
- Class: Reptilia
- Order: Squamata
- Suborder: Serpentes
- Family: Boidae
- Genus: Eunectes
- Species: E. murinus

Binomial name
- Eunectes murinus (Linnaeus, 1758)
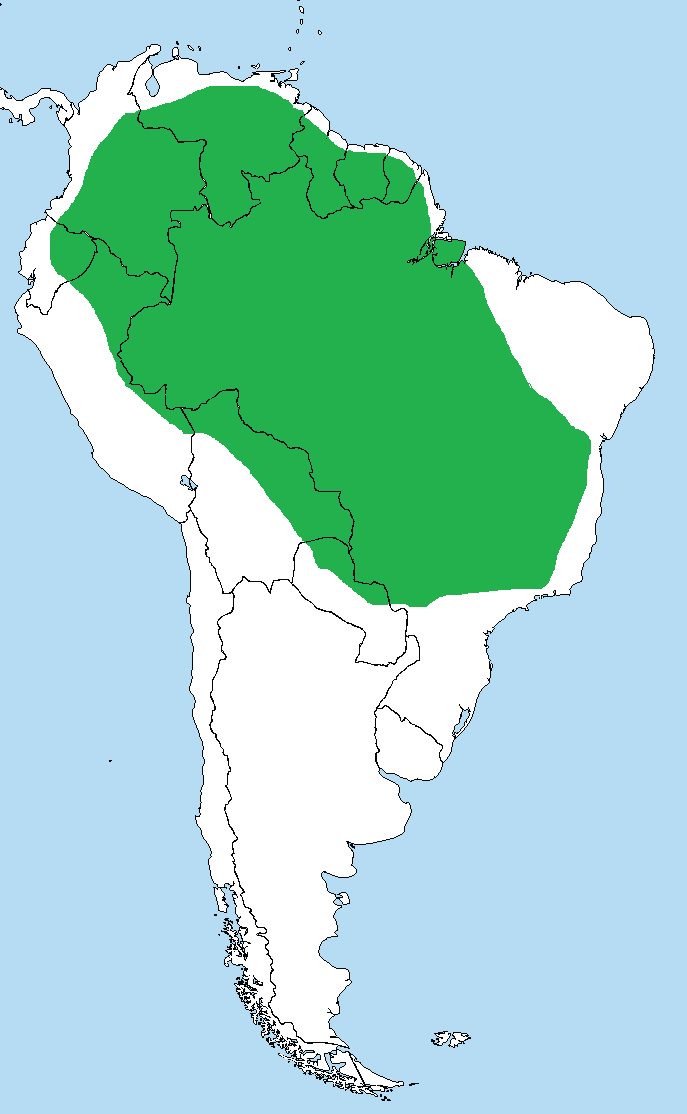
- Distribution of Eunectes murinus

Synonyms
- [Boa] murina Linnaeus, 1758; [Boa] Scytale Linnaeus, 1758; Boa gigas Latreille, 1802; Boa anacondo Daudin, 1803; Boa aquatica Wied-Neuwied, 1824; Eunectes murinus – Wagler, 1830; Eunectes murina – Gray, 1831; Eunectes murinus – Boulenger, 1893; Eunectes scytale – Stull, 1935; [Eunectes murinus] murinus – Dunn & Conant, 1936; Eunectes barbouri Dunn & Conant, 1936; Eunectes murinus murinus – Dunn, 1944; Eunectes akayima Rivas et al., 2024

= Green anaconda =

Green Anaconda Temporal range: Late Pleistocene-recent

Species of snake

The green anaconda (Eunectes murinus) is a species of snake in the family Boidae (boas). The species is native to northern South America. It is one of the longest and heaviest known extant snake species. Like all boas, it is a non-venomous constrictor. The green anaconda generally has a life expectancy of ten years in the wild, although some specimens live longer when taken care of in captivity. The green anaconda lives in tropical rainforests and tends to prefer shallow, slow-moving waters, such as streams, rivers, and flooded grasslands. It spends most of its time in the water but is also found on land in thick vegetation.

== Common names ==
Additional common names for Eunectes murinus include common anaconda, common water boa, akayima, and sucuri.

== Taxonomy ==
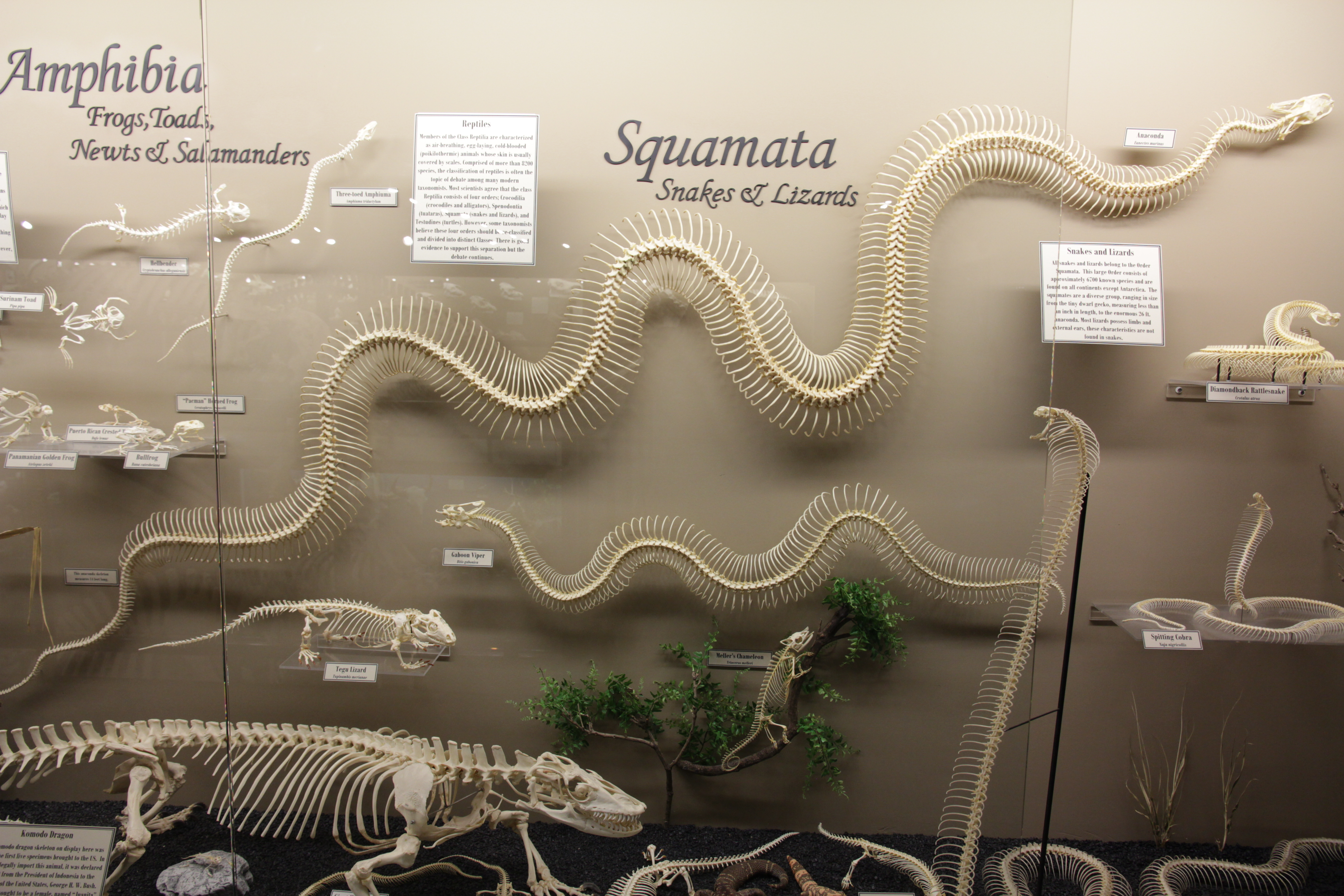
A 4.3-metre (14 ft) anaconda skeleton on display at Museum of Osteology with other squamates

In his famous 10th edition of Systema Naturae of 1758, Carl Linnaeus cited descriptions by Albertus Seba and by Laurens Theodorus Gronovius to erect the distinct new species Boa murina of his new genus Boa, which contained eight other species, including Boa constrictor. The generic name Boa came from an ancient Latin word for a type of large snake. The first specimens of Boa murina were immature individuals from 75 to 90 cm (2.5 to 3.0 ft) in length. In 1830, Johann Georg Wagler erected the separate genus Eunectes for Linnaeus's Boa murina after more and larger specimens were known and described. Because of the masculine gender of Eunectes, the feminine Latin specific name murina was changed to murinus.

Linnaeus almost certainly chose the scientific name Boa murina based on the original Latin description given by Albertus Seba in 1735: "Serpens testudinea americana, murium insidiator" [tortoise-patterned (spotted) American snake, a predator that lies in wait for mice (and rats)]. The Latin adjective murinus (murina) in this case would mean "of mice" or "connected with mice", understood in context as "preying on mice", and not as "mouse-gray-colored", another possible meaning of Latin murinus, as now often wrongly indicated for E. murinus.

Early English-language sources, such as George Shaw, referred to Boa murina as the "rat boa". The Penny Cyclopaedia (Vol. 5) entry for boa explained: "The trivial name murina was given to it from being said to lie in wait for mice." Linnaeus described the appearance of Boa murina in Latin as "rufus maculis supra rotundatis" [reddish-brown with rounded spots on upper parts] and made no reference to a gray coloration. Early descriptions of the green anaconda by different authors variously referred to the general color as brown, glaucous, green, or gray.

English common names for E. murinus include green anaconda, anaconda, common anaconda, and water boa. The word akayima and variants (okoyimo, okoimo) have been used by the local Carib people to refer to the green anaconda for centuries before its formal scientific description. The name akayima comes from the local Cariban languages, with akayi meaning "snake" and the suffix -ima describing largeness in a way that elevates the term to a separate category, giving a literal meaning of "The Great Snake".

Several proposals have been made to split a new species or subspecies from the green anaconda (Eunectes murinus), such as Eunectes gigas (Latreille, 1801), Eunectes barbouri (Dunn and Conant, 1936), and Eunectes akayima (Rivas et al., 2024). These proposed species are now considered to be synonymous with E. murinus.

== Description ==
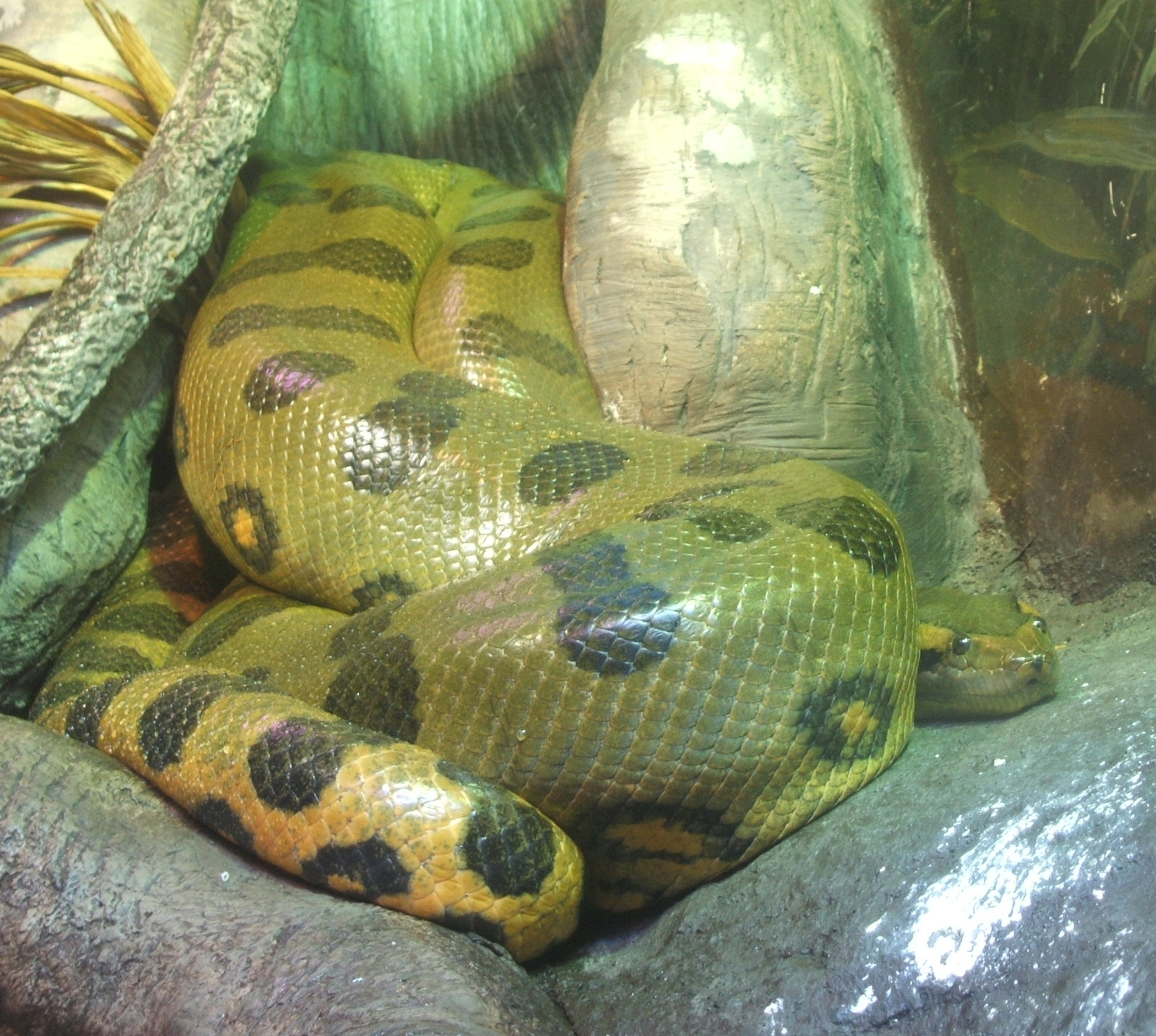
An anaconda at the New England Aquarium

The green anaconda is the world's heaviest and one of the world's longest snakes, reaching a total length (tail included) of up to 6.32 m (20 ft 9 in) long. More typical mature female specimens reportedly can range up to 5 m (16 ft 5 in), with a mean length of about 4.6 m (15 ft 1 in), being generally much larger than males, which average around 3 m (9 ft 10 in). Weights are less well studied, though reportedly range from 30 to 80 kg (66 to 176 lb) in a typical adult.

Eunectes murinus is the largest snake native to the Americas. Although it is slightly shorter than the reticulated python, it is far bulkier. The bulk of a 5.2-metre (17 ft 1 in) green anaconda is comparable to that of a 7.4-metre (24 ft 3 in) reticulated python. Reports of anacondas 11–12 m (35–40 ft) or even longer also exist, but such claims must be regarded with caution, as no specimens of such lengths have ever been deposited in a museum and hard evidence is lacking. The longest and heaviest verified specimen encountered by Venezuelan herpetologist Jesús Antonio Rivas, who had examined more than 900 anacondas, was a female 5.21 m (17 ft 1 in) long and weighing 97.5 kg (214 lb 15 oz). In 1937, a specimen shot in Guyana was claimed to have measured 5.9 m (19 ft 4 in) long and weighed 163 kg (359 lb 6 oz).

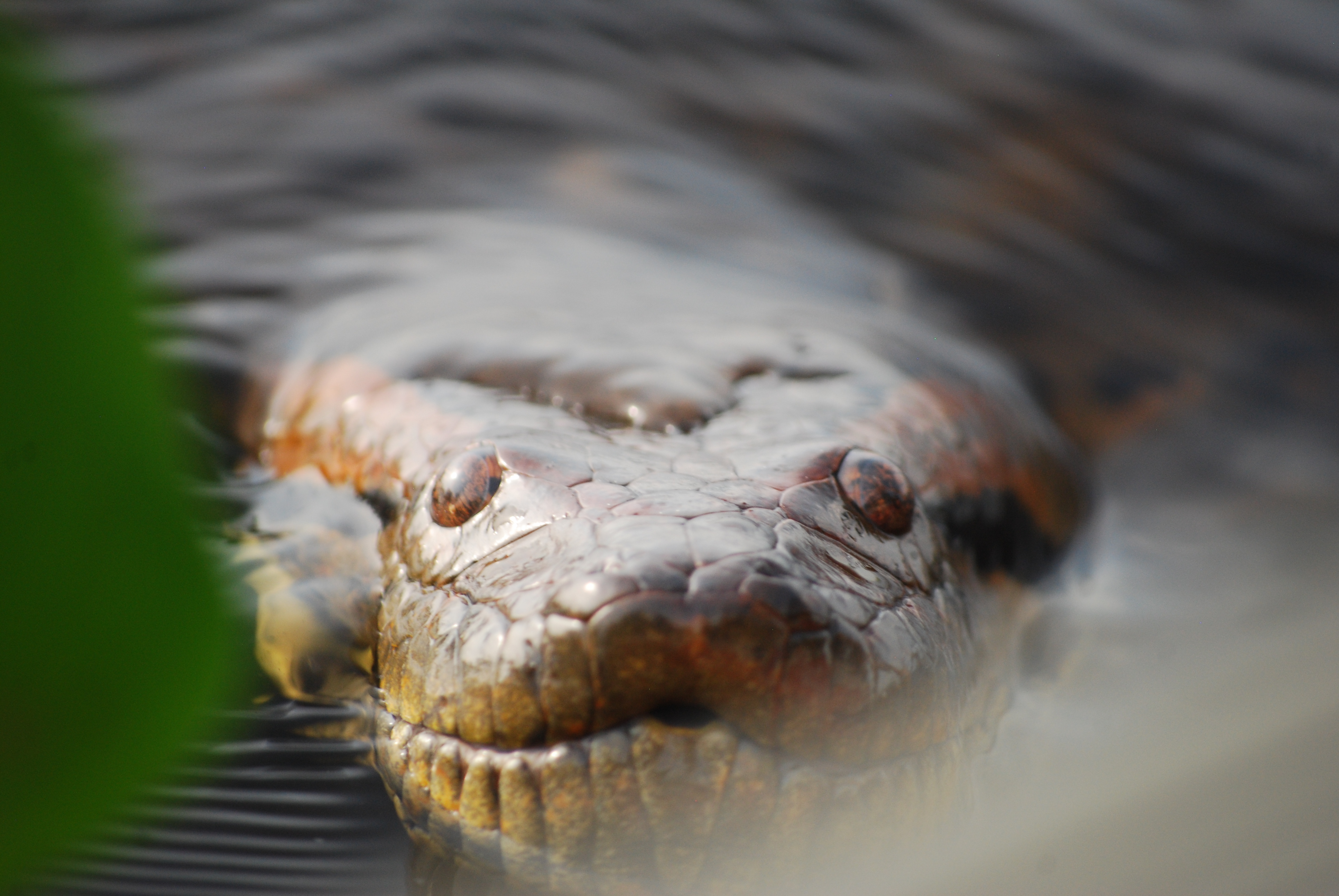
Close-up of head

The color pattern consists of an olive green background overlaid with black blotches along the length of the body. The head is narrow compared to the body, usually with distinctive orange-yellow striping on either side. The eyes are set high on the head, allowing the snake to see out of the water while swimming without exposing its body. The anaconda's jaw bones splay open at the front because they are loosely connected by flexible ligaments instead of bone. This allows it to swallow prey larger than the size of its head. The windpipe in its mouth allows it to breathe while swallowing its prey. Its largest internal organ is the liver. The digestion process takes many days to complete. During this time, the anaconda behaves very sluggishly.

=== Difficulties in determining the maximum size of anacondas ===
The remote location of the snake's habitat has historically made locating, capturing, and returning specimens difficult. Transporting very large specimens to museums, especially before substantial decay, is difficult, though this has not prevented the return of much larger and more cumbersome crocodilian specimens. Skins can stretch substantially, increasing the snake's size by more than 50% if stretched during the tanning process.

Reports without physical proof are considered dubious if from non-scientists, as such individuals may at worst be more interested in promoting themselves or telling a good tale, or at best may not be sufficiently trained in proper measurement methods. Observational reports of animals that were not captured are even more dubious, as even trained scientists often substantially overestimate the size of anacondas prior to capture. According to the Guinness Book of World Records, this species has been perhaps subject to the most extreme size exaggerations of any living animal.

=== Historical records ===
Numerous historical accounts of the green anaconda are reported, often of improbable sizes. Several zoologists, notably Henry Walter Bates and Alfred Russel Wallace, among others, note rumors of snakes beyond 9 or 12 m (30 or 40 ft) long, but in each case, their direct observations were limited to snakes around 6 m (20 ft) in length. Numerous estimates and second-hand accounts abound, but are generally considered unreliable. To prove the point of overestimating, in Guyana in 1937, zoologist Alpheus Hyatt Verrill asked the expedition team he was with to estimate the length of a large, curled-up anaconda on a rock. The team's guesses ran from 6.1 to 18.3 m (20 ft 0 in to 60 ft 0 in). When measured, this specimen was found to be 5.9 m (19 ft 4 in).

Almost all specimens in excess of 6 m (20 ft), including a much-publicized specimen allegedly 11.36 m (37 ft 3 in) long, have no voucher specimens, including skins or bones.

The skin of one specimen, stretched to 10 m (32 ft 10 in), has been preserved in the Instituto Butantan in São Paulo and is reported to have come from an anaconda of 7.6 m (24 ft 11 in) in length. While in Colombia in 1978, herpetologist William W. Lamar had an encounter with a large female specimen 7.5 m (24 ft 7 in) long, estimated to weigh between 136 and 180 kg (300 and 397 lb). In 1962, W. L. Schurz claimed to have measured a snake in Brazil of 8.46 m (27 ft 9 in) with a maximum girth of 112 cm (3 ft 8 in).

One female, reportedly measuring 7.9 m (25 ft 11 in) in length, shot in 1963 in Nariva Swamp, Trinidad, contained a 1.5-metre (4 ft 11 in) caiman. A specimen of 7.3 m (23 ft 11 in), reportedly with a weight of 149 kg (328 lb), was caught at the mouth of the Kassikaityu River in Guyana, having been restrained by 13 local men, and was later air-lifted for a zoo collection in the United States, but died in ill health shortly thereafter. The largest size verified for E. murinus in captivity was for a specimen kept in Pittsburgh Zoo and PPG Aquarium, which grew to a length of 6.27 m (20 ft 7 in) by the time she died on July 20, 1960. When this specimen was 5.94 m (19 ft 6 in) long, she weighed 91 kg (200 lb 10 oz).

The estimated weight for an anaconda in the range of 8 m (26 ft) would be at least 200 kg (441 lb). National Geographic has published a weight up to 227 kg (500 lb) for E. murinus, but this is almost certainly a mere estimation. Weight can vary considerably in large specimens depending on environmental conditions and recent feedings, with Verrill's aforementioned specimen, having been extremely bulky, scaled at 163 kg (359 lb 6 oz), whereas another specimen considered large at 5.06 m (16 ft 7 in), weighed only 54 kg (119 lb 1 oz).

=== Estimates of maximal size ===
Size presents challenges to attain breeding conditions in larger female anacondas. While larger sizes provide the benefit of a larger number of offspring per clutch, the breeding frequency of the individuals reduces with size, indicating that a point exists at which the advantage of a larger clutch size is negated by the female no longer being able to breed. For the anaconda, this limit was estimated at 6.7 m (22 ft) in total length. This is consistent with the results of a revision of the size at maturity and maximum size of several snakes from North America, which found that the maximum size is between 1.5 and 2.5 times the size at maturity.

The minimum size of breeding anacondas in a survey of 780 individuals was 2.1 m (6 ft 11 in) in snout-to-vent length (SVL), indicating that the maximum size attained by anacondas following this pattern would be 5.3 m (17 ft 5 in) SVL. However, most specimens of the green anaconda are captured from the llanos, a habitat which is more accessible to humans and has smaller prey available, while the rainforest, which is much less explored and has more plentiful large prey, may be home to larger snakes.

The green anaconda is an apex predator, positioning it at the top of the food chain.

== Geographic distribution and habitat ==
Eunectes murinus is found in South America east of the Andes, in countries including Bolivia, Brazil, Colombia, Ecuador, the Guianas, Peru, and Venezuela, from as far north as the island of Trinidad, and as far south as northern Paraguay. The type locality given is "America".

In April 2021, the green anaconda was added to Florida's list of prohibited nonnative species. As of August 2023, eleven specimens of the green anaconda have been verifiably observed in the wild in Florida, including one juvenile found in the Florida Everglades. The range of these specimens, some of which were able to evade capture, spans from Gainesville to Homestead, Florida – a distance of over 350 miles (560 km). Florida is the only state in the continental United States with suitable habitat for the species.

While individual specimens have been observed or captured in Florida dating back to 2010, as of 2023, there is no known established population. However, the ecological, economic, and safety risks posed by their existence in the state are deemed "very high" by the Florida Fish and Wildlife Conservation Commission, with the ecological threat reaching the extreme risk level, as introduced anacondas are apex predators, able to compete with Florida's native species and potentially prey on native wildlife, such as the white-tailed deer, the American alligator, the American crocodile, wading birds, other birds, mammals, and reptiles.

The green anaconda lives in swamps, marshes, lagoons, and slow-moving streams and rivers, mainly in the tropical rainforests and seasonally flooded savannas of the Amazon and Orinoco basins. It is cumbersome on land, but stealthy and sleek in the water. Its eyes and nasal openings are on top of the head, allowing it to lie in wait for prey while remaining nearly completely submerged.

== Behavior ==
The green anaconda is mostly nocturnal and aquatic. It floats underwater and is known to swim quickly. Its eyes and nostrils are located on the top of the head, allowing the snake to breathe and watch for prey while the rest of the body is hidden underwater. When prey passes by or stops to drink, the green anaconda strikes, coils around the prey, constricts and suffocates it to death, and then swallows it whole.

=== Feeding ===
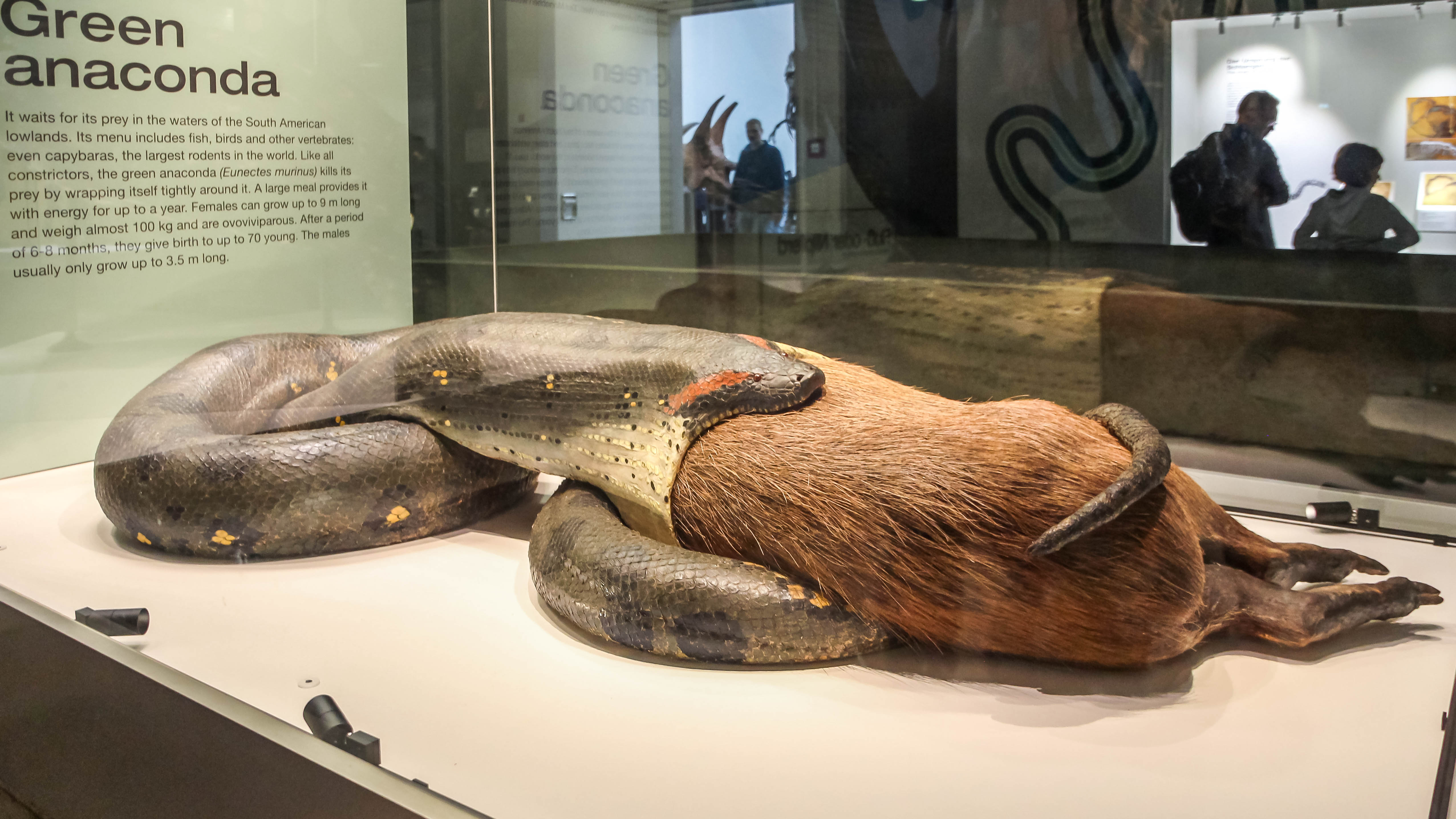
A depiction of a capybara (Hydrochoerus hydrochaeris) being swallowed by an anaconda, at the Senckenberg Museum

The green anaconda is an apex predator with a wide variety of prey, almost anything it can overpower, including fishes, amphibians, birds, various mammals, and other reptiles. Particularly large specimens of the green anaconda may consume tapirs, deer, peccaries, capybaras, jaguars, and caimans, but such large meals are rare. Juvenile green anacondas feed on small birds and young caimans typically 40–70 grams (1.4–2.5 oz) in weight. As they develop, their diet becomes increasingly complex. Prey availability varies more in grasslands than in river basins.

In both habitats the green anaconda has been found to feed on large prey, usually 14–50% of its own mass. Examples of prey include broad-snouted caimans, spectacled caimans, yacare caimans, black caimans, smooth-fronted caimans, wattled jacanas, capybaras, red-rumped agoutis, collared peccaries, South American tapirs, boa constrictors, brown-banded water snakes, green iguanas, cryptic golden tegus, scorpion mud turtles, gibba turtles, Arrau turtles, savanna side-necked turtles, red side-necked turtles, and northern pudús. Capybaras are common prey for the green anaconda.

Large prey occasionally cause serious injuries or death. This risk is likely reduced when the green anaconda can drown the prey. Some feed on carrion and conspecifics, usually inside or around water. Large green anacondas can go weeks to months without food after a large meal, because they have a low metabolism. Females have increased postpartum feeding to recover from their reproductive investment.

Many local stories and legends report the green anaconda feeding on humans, but there is little evidence of this.

Cannibalism in the green anaconda is known, most recorded cases involving a larger female consuming a smaller male. Scientists hypothesize several explanations, including the great sexual dimorphism of the species, and a female's need for food after breeding to sustain the long gestation. The nearby male simply provides the opportunistic female a ready source of nutrition.

In southeastern Peru, potential prey of the green anaconda include collared peccaries, lowland pacas, brocket deer (Mazama sp.), brown agoutis, cocoi herons, neotropical otters, gold tegus, spectacled caimans, and giant otters. Observations show that the green anaconda may climb to the top of trees for prey such as green iguanas and brown-throated sloths, demonstrating the willingness to leave its preferred habitat for prey. The green anaconda may even target domestic prey, including domestic dogs, chickens, cattle, water buffalo, sheep, domestic cats, and wild boar.

== As prey ==
Although the green anaconda is an apex predator, even large adult specimens are part of the diet of Orinoco crocodiles, black caimans, and jaguars.

== Reproduction ==
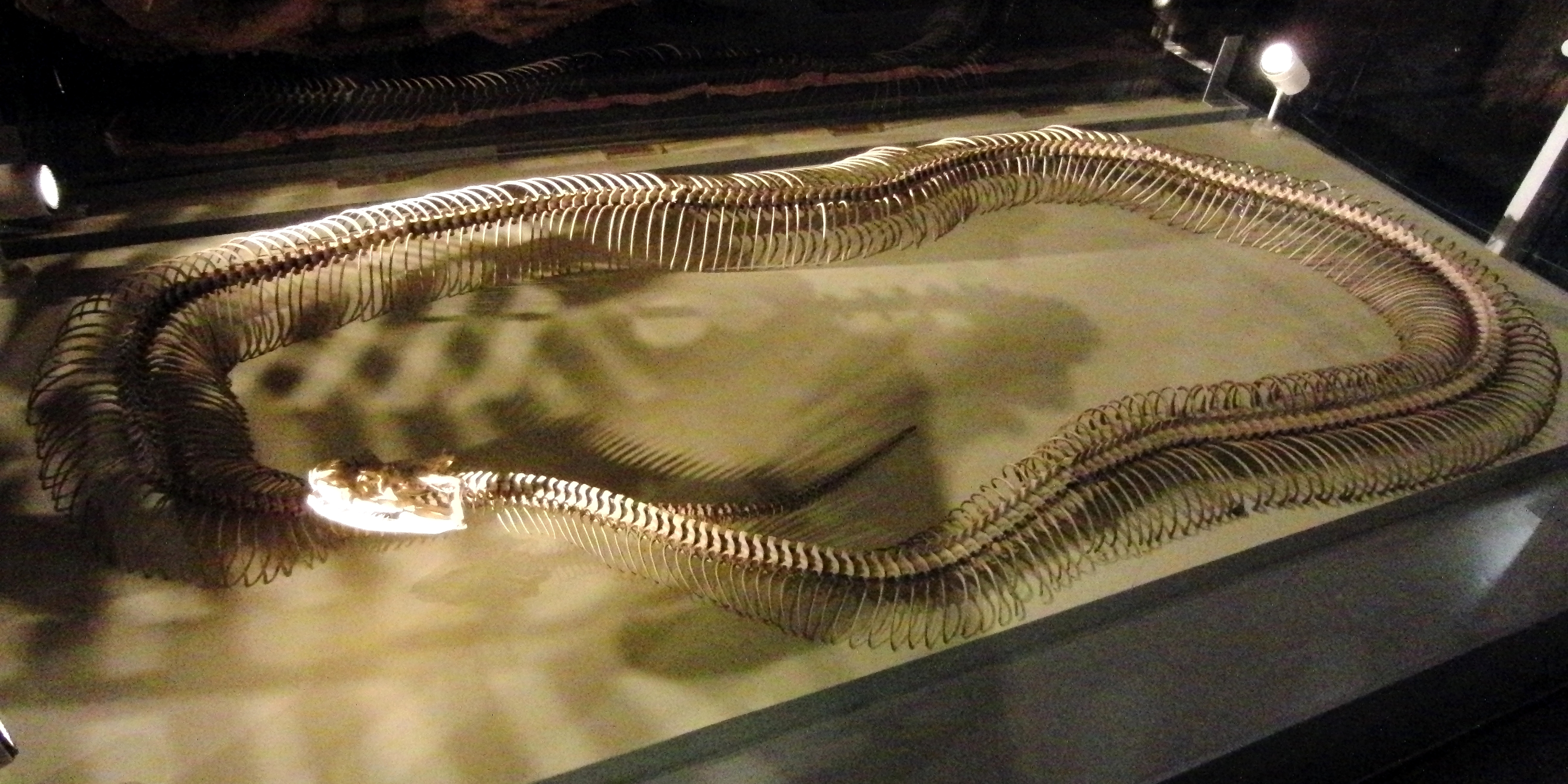
A skeleton of E. murinus, exhibited at the National Museum of Nature and Science, Tokyo, Japan

Individuals of the green anaconda are solitary until the mating season, which occurs during the rainy season, and can last several months, usually from April to May. Typically, females leave pheromone trails for males to follow, but how males track it is unclear. It may be that the pheromone is airborne. This theory is supported by the observation of females that remain motionless, while many males move towards them from all directions. Male anacondas also often flick their tongues to sense chemicals that signal the presence of a female.

Often many males find the same female and wrap around her to copulate with her. Such a "breeding ball" of up to 12 males can stay in this position for two to four weeks as males wrestle in slow-motion to mate with the female.

During mating, males use their spurs to arouse the female. They aggressively press their cloacal regions hard against the female body, while continuously scratching her with their spurs. This can produce a scratching sound. Mating approaches its climax when the stimulus of the males' spurs induces the female to raise her cloacal region, allowing the cloacae of two snakes to move together. The male then coils his tail around the female, and they copulate. Often, the strongest and largest male wins, but the female may choose another male as she is much larger and stronger. Courtship and mating occur almost exclusively in water.

Mating is followed by a gestation period of six to seven months. The species is ovoviviparous, with females giving birth to live young. Litters usually consist of 20 to 40 offspring, although as many as 100 may be produced. After giving birth, females may lose up to half their weight.

Neonates are around 70–80 cm (2 ft 4 in – 2 ft 7 in) long and receive no parental care. Because of their small size, they often fall prey to other animals. If they survive, they grow quickly until sexual maturity in a few years, then grow more slowly.

When no males are available, facultative parthenogenesis is possible, producing a viable homozygous litter. In 2014, a green anaconda in West Midland Safari Park gave birth to three young through parthenogenesis.

== Longevity ==
In the wild, the green anaconda may live for about ten years. In captivity, it can live 30 years or more. The 2023 Guinness Book of World Records for the oldest living snake in captivity is a green anaconda aged 37 years 317 days, verified on 14 May 2021 by Paul Swires, at Montecasino Bird & Reptile Park in Johannesburg, South Africa.

== In popular culture ==
The green anaconda has been portrayed in horror literature and films, often as incredibly gigantic, agile, and with the ability to swallow adult humans. In popular culture these traits are occasionally attributed to other species, such as the Burmese python and the reticulated python, but to less extent than to the green anaconda. Despite having the capability to overpower a man, there is no verified evidence of the green anaconda consuming humans, unlike the reticulated python which is known to consume humans. This is possibly because large specimens of the green anaconda inhabit remote areas deep inside the Amazon jungle, which is isolated from humans, unlike the reticulated python which inhabits heavily populated areas in Asia.

== See also ==
- List of largest snakes
