= Cetopsidium ferreirai =

Conservation status
- Near Threatened (IUCN 3.1)

Scientific classification
- Kingdom: Animalia
- Phylum: Chordata
- Class: Actinopterygii
- Order: Siluriformes
- Family: Cetopsidae
- Genus: Cetopsidium
- Species: C. ferreirai

Binomial name
- Cetopsidium ferreirai Vari, Ferraris & de Pinna, 2005

Species of fish

Cetopsidium ferreirai is a species of freshwater ray-finned fish belonging to the family Cetopsidae, the whale catfishes. This species is endemic to Brazil where it is known from the Trombetas River in Pará, it has also been recorded from the Uatumã River in Amazonas. It may be more widespread than is known. C. ferreirae is threatened by hydroelectric dams.
