= Cetopsidium pemon =

Conservation status
- Least Concern (IUCN 3.1)

Scientific classification
- Kingdom: Animalia
- Phylum: Chordata
- Class: Actinopterygii
- Order: Siluriformes
- Family: Cetopsidae
- Genus: Cetopsidium
- Species: C. pemon

Binomial name
- Cetopsidium pemon Vari, Ferraris & de Pinna, 2005

Species of fish

Cetopsidium pemon is a species of freshwater ray-finned fish belonging to the family Cetopsidae, the whale catfishes. This fish is found in the Caroni River and Caura River basins, which are southern tributaries of the Orinoco in eastern Venezuela. it is also found in the Meta River basin, part of the western portions of the Orinoco system in eastern Colombia, as well as the upper portions of the Branco River in northern Brazil and it is also found in western Guyana.
