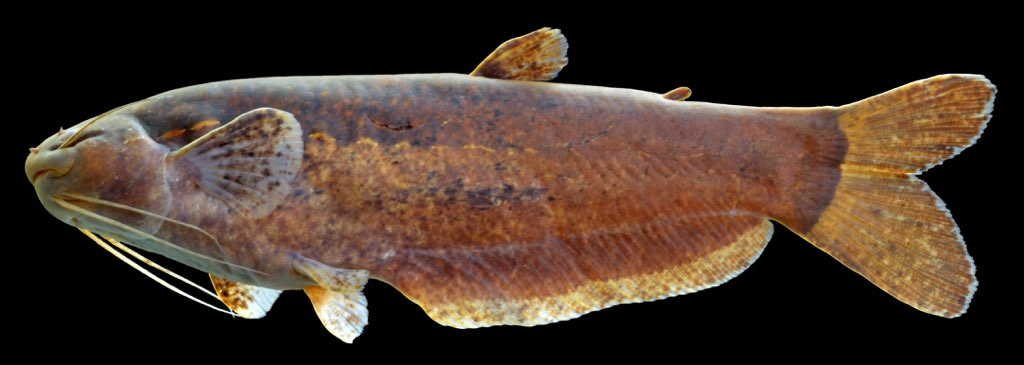

Conservation status
- Least Concern (IUCN 3.1)

Scientific classification
- Kingdom: Animalia
- Phylum: Chordata
- Class: Actinopterygii
- Order: Siluriformes
- Family: Cetopsidae
- Genus: Helogenes
- Species: H. marmoratus

Binomial name
- Helogenes marmoratus Günther, 1863

Synonyms
- Helogenes amazonae Delsman, 1941; Helogenes unidorsalis Glodek & Carter, 1978

= Helogenes marmoratus =

Species of fish

Helogenes marmoratus is a species of freshwater ray-finned fishes belonging to the family Cetopsidae, the whale catfishes. This species is fiund in Brazil, Ecuador, French Guiana, Guyana, Peru, Suriname and Venezuela. It is found in the Atlantic drainages of the Guianas, the upper Orinoco and Rio Negro systems, and the upper Amazon River basin. This species grows to a length of 7.3 cm (2.9 in).

== Ecology ==
H. marmoratus is nocturnal and feeds mainly on terrestrial insects, particularly ants. It is a typical inhabitant of black or clear waters, usually in forest streams with moderate to swift current flow over firm sand or gravel bottoms.

H. marmoratus lives hidden under plants, litter or plant debris. It has a colour pattern that resembles dead leaves. The fish may even lie on its side among the leaf litter as a form of camouflage. It can easily be mistaken as a piece of dead wood when it rests on its side, motionless on the bottom. It often swims on one side in undulating movements. When disturbed, H. marmoratus will move upwards through the root-tangle, exposing its head or fore body above the water surface. If disturbed further, it will quickly swim in an upright position towards the nearest debris shelter. Also, H. marmoratus is known to jump on the bank during rotenone fishing by Tukano and Tuyuka indigenous people, then jump back to the stream after water renovation.
