= Paracetopsis esmeraldas =

Conservation status
- Near Threatened (IUCN 3.1)

Scientific classification
- Kingdom: Animalia
- Phylum: Chordata
- Class: Actinopterygii
- Order: Siluriformes
- Family: Cetopsidae
- Genus: Paracetopsis
- Species: P. esmeraldas

Binomial name
- Paracetopsis esmeraldas Vari, Ferraris & de Pinna, 2005

Species of fish

Paracetopsis esmeraldas s a species of freshwater ray-finned fishes belonging to the family Cetopsidae, the whale catfishes. This species is endemic to Ecuador where it occurs in the Esmeraldas River basin of the northwest. This species grows to a standard length of 18.8 cm (7.4 in).
