= Sauli =

Sauli may refer to:

== People ==
- Alexander Sauli (1535–1592), from Milan, beatified by Benedict XIV, and canonized by Pope Pius X
- Anneli Sauli (1932–2022), Finnish film actress
- Jalmari Sauli (1889–1957), Finnish writer and track and field athlete
- Sauli Koskinen (born 1985), Finnish TV/radio personality and entertainment reporter
- Sauli Lehtonen (1975–1995), Finnish tango singer
- Sauli Niinistö (born 1948), former President of Finland
- Sauli Rytky (1918–2006), Finnish cross-country skier
- Sauli Väisänen (born 1994), Finnish footballer

== Other uses ==
- Denticetopsis sauli, a species of catfish of the family Cetopsidae
- Hyloxalus sauli, a species of frog in the family Dendrobatidae
