= Cetopsidium soniae =

Conservation status
- Data Deficient (IUCN 3.1)

Scientific classification
- Kingdom: Animalia
- Phylum: Chordata
- Class: Actinopterygii
- Division: Teleostei
- Order: Siluriformes
- Family: Cetopsidae
- Genus: Cetopsidium
- Species: C. soniae

Binomial name
- Cetopsidium soniae Vari & Ferraris, 2009

Species of fish

Cetopsidium soniae is a species of freshwater ray-finned fish belonging to the family Cetopsidae, the whale catfishes. This fish is only known from the type specimens collected from the Manari River, a tributary of the Takutu River in Guyana. The Takuti forms the border between Guyana and Brazil, so this species is probably also found in Brazil.
