= Paracetopsis atahualpa =

Conservation status
- Vulnerable (IUCN 3.1)

Scientific classification
- Kingdom: Animalia
- Phylum: Chordata
- Class: Actinopterygii
- Order: Siluriformes
- Family: Cetopsidae
- Genus: Paracetopsis
- Species: P. atahualpa

Binomial name
- Paracetopsis atahualpa Vari, Ferraris & de Pinna, 2005

Species of fish

Paracetopsis atahualpa is a species of freshwater ray-finned fishes belonging to the family Cetopsidae, the whale catfishes. This species is found in Peru and Ecuador where it occurs in the Tumbes River basin (northwestern Peru) and the adjoining upper reaches of the Zarumilla River (southwestern Ecuador). P. atahualpa appears to be an uncommon species with a restricted range within which its habitat has been degraded by mining, land-use changes and pollution The maximum standard length of this species is 24.2 cm (9.5 in).

It is named after Atahualpa, the last independent ruler of the Inca Empire, which encompassed the area of distribution of the species.
