= Helogenes gouldingi =

Conservation status
- Least Concern (IUCN 3.1)

Scientific classification
- Kingdom: Animalia
- Phylum: Chordata
- Class: Actinopterygii
- Order: Siluriformes
- Family: Cetopsidae
- Genus: Helogenes
- Species: H. gouldingi

Binomial name
- Helogenes gouldingi Vari & H. Ortega, 1986

Species of fish

Helogenes gouldingi is a species of freshwater ray-finned fishes belonging to the family Cetopsidae, the whale catfishes. This species is endemic to Brazil where it is found in black-water tributaries of the Madeira River basin. This species grows to a standard length of 4.7 cm (1.9 in).
