= Cetopsidium orientale =

Conservation status
- Least Concern (IUCN 3.1)

Scientific classification
- Kingdom: Animalia
- Phylum: Chordata
- Class: Actinopterygii
- Order: Siluriformes
- Family: Cetopsidae
- Genus: Cetopsidium
- Species: C. orientale

Binomial name
- Cetopsidium orientale (Vari, Ferraris & Keith, 2003)

Synonyms
- Pseudocetopsis orientale Vari, Ferraris & Keith, 2003

Species of fish

Cetopsidium orientale is a species of freshwater ray-finned fish belonging to the family Cetopsidae, the whale catfishes. This fish is found in the coastal rivers of Suriname and French Guiana in the region from the Corantijn River along the border between Suriname and Guyana to the Oyapock-Oiapoque River along the French Guiana-Brazil border; it is likely this species is also occurs in the left bank tributaries to the Corantijn River draining from Guyana and the Oiapoque River in Brazil.
