= Denticetopsis epa =

Conservation status
- Least Concern (IUCN 3.1)

Scientific classification
- Kingdom: Animalia
- Phylum: Chordata
- Class: Actinopterygii
- Order: Siluriformes
- Family: Cetopsidae
- Genus: Denticetopsis
- Species: D. epa

Binomial name
- Denticetopsis epa Vari, Ferraris & de Pinna, 2005

Species of fish

Denticetopsis epa is a species of freshwater ray-finned fishes belonging to the family Cetopsidae, the whale catfishes. This species is endemic to Brazil where it is known from several localities in the lower portions of the Tocantins River basin. D. epa is a benthopelagic fish that grows to a standard length of 4.7 cm (1.9 in).
