= Helogenes uruyensis =

Conservation status
- Near Threatened (IUCN 3.1)

Scientific classification
- Kingdom: Animalia
- Phylum: Chordata
- Class: Actinopterygii
- Order: Siluriformes
- Family: Cetopsidae
- Genus: Helogenes
- Species: H. uruyensis

Binomial name
- Helogenes uruyensis Fernández-Yépez, 1967

Species of fish

Helogenes uruyensis is a species of freshwater ray-finned fishes belonging to the family Cetopsidae, the whale catfishes. This species is endemic to Venezuela, where it is found in the Uruyén River basin. This species reaches a standard length of 4.3 cm (1.7 in).
