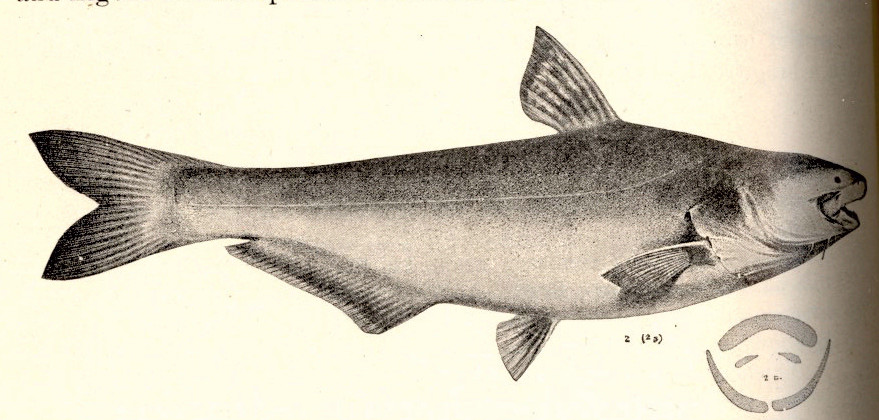

Conservation status
- Near Threatened (IUCN 3.1)

Scientific classification
- Kingdom: Animalia
- Phylum: Chordata
- Class: Actinopterygii
- Order: Siluriformes
- Family: Cetopsidae
- Genus: Paracetopsis
- Species: P. bleekeri

Binomial name
- Paracetopsis bleekeri Bleeker, 1862

Synonyms
- Cetopsis ventralis Gill, 1870; Cetopsis occidentalis Steindachner, 1880

= Paracetopsis bleekeri =

Species of fish

Paracetopsis is a species of freshwater ray-finned fishes belonging to the family Cetopsidae, the whale catfishes. This species is endemic to Ecuador where it occurs in the Guayas River basin in the southwest. This species grows to a length of 24.2 cm (9.5 in).
