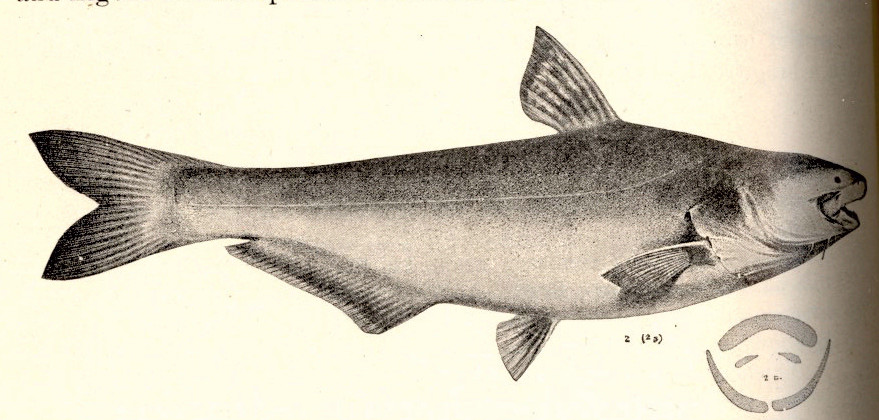
- Paracetopsis bleekeri

Scientific classification
- Kingdom: Animalia
- Phylum: Chordata
- Class: Actinopterygii
- Order: Siluriformes
- Family: Cetopsidae
- Subfamily: Cetopsinae
- Genus: Paracetopsis; Bleeker, 1862

Type species
- Paracetopsis bleekeri Bleeker, 1862

Species
- see text

Synonyms
- Paracetopsis C. H. Eigenmann & T. H. Bean, 1907; Cetopsogiton C. H. Eigenmann & B. A. Bean, 1910

= Paracetopsis =

Genus of fishes

Paracetopsis is a genus of freshwater ray-finned fishes belonging to the family Cetopsidae, the whale catfishes. The fishes in this genus are found in South America.

== Species ==
Paracetopsis contains the following valid species:

- Paracetopsis atahualpa Vari, Ferraris & de Pinna, 2005
- Paracetopsis bleekeri Bleeker, 1862
- Paracetopsis esmeraldas Vari, Ferraris & de Pinna, 2005

== Distribution ==
Paracetopsis species are known from river drainages of the Pacific coast of Peru and Ecuador.

== Description ==
Paracetopsis species can be distinguished from species of all other genera in the Cetopsinae by the combination of the possession of a vomerine tooth patch with two or more rows of teeth and a medial gap between the contralateral components of the tooth patch. Like in other species of cetopsines, mature males have elongated distal filaments of the dorsal and pectoral fin rays and a convex (instead of straight) margin to the anal fin.

The body is relatively elongate; anteriorly the body is not compressed much, but becomes progressively compressed posteriorly. The lateral line is complete and midlateral; though unbranched in P. bleekeri and P. esmeraldas, in P. atahualpa the lateral line has a few ventrally direct branches on the caudal peduncle. The dorsal profile is straight to slightly convex; the ventral profile is convex at the abdomen and straight posteriorly. The caudal peduncle depth is approximately equal to its length. The head in profile is acutely triangular overall with a bluntly rounded snout. The eyes are placed on the sides of the head and are visible from above, but not from below. The mouth is inferior and the width is about one-half the length of the head. They have three pairs of barbels, one pair of slender maxillary barbels and two pairs of mental barbels; all three pairs of barbels are approximately the same length. The caudal fin is moderately to deeply forked and symmetrical with the tips of the lobes slightly rounded. The base of the anal fin is comparatively long. The pelvic fins are also usually moderately long.

P. atahualpa has shorter pelvic fins and is darker in colour than P. bleekeri. P. atahualpa has a maxillary barbel with a distinctly dark base instead of a pale base and a distinct notch behind the head that is not present in P. esmeraldas. Both P. atahualpa and P. esmeraldas have a distinct patch of pigment on the operculum not present in P. bleekeri. The maximum standard lengths of these catfishes varies from 18.8 cm (7.4 in), on P. esmereldas, to 24.2 cm (9.5 in) in the other two species.
