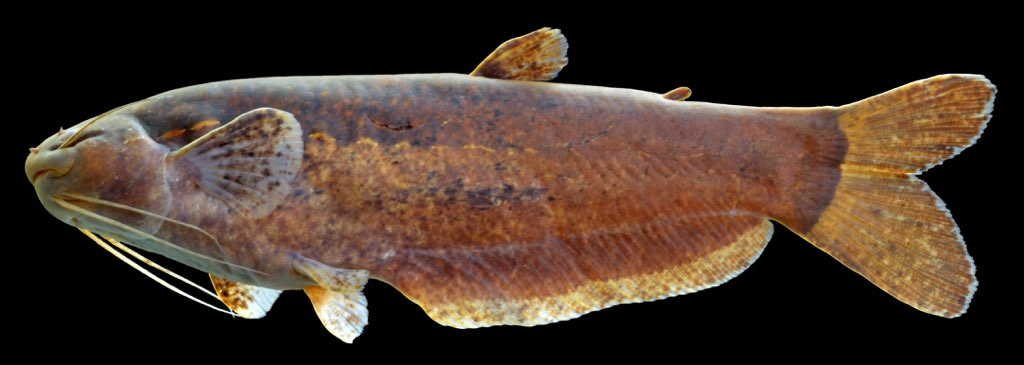
- Helogenes marmoratus

Scientific classification
- Kingdom: Animalia
- Phylum: Chordata
- Class: Actinopterygii
- Order: Siluriformes
- Family: Cetopsidae
- Subfamily: Helogeneinae; Regan, 1911
- Genus: Helogenes; Günther, 1863

Type species
- Helogenes marmoratus Günther, 1863

Synonyms
- Leyvaichthys Dahl, 1960

= Helogenes =

Genus of fishes

Helogenes, the driftwood marbled catfishes, is a genus of ray-finned fishes belonging to the family Cetopsidae, the whale catfishes. The fishes in this genus are found in tropical South America.

Helogeneinae is the sister taxon of Cetopsinae, the other subfamily in the family Cetopsidae.

== Species ==
Helogenes contains the following valid species:

- Helogenes castaneus (Dahl, 1960)
- Helogenes gouldingi Vari & H. Ortega, 1986
- Helogenes marmoratus Günther, 1863
- Helogenes uruyensis Fernández-Yépez, 1967

== Distribution ==
Helogenes species occur through much of the Amazon River basin, the southern portions of the Orinoco River basin, the coastal rivers of the Guianas, and at least the lower portions of the Tocantins River.

== Description ==
In Helogenes, the dorsal fin base is short, the anal fin base is elongate, the dorsal and pectoral fins lack spines, the adipose fin is usually present, but is reduced or absent in one population of one species. Helogenes species grow to about 4.3–7.3 centimetres (1.7–2.9 in) SL.

== Ecology ==
Helogenes species feed on allochthonous insects. The only species for which details of the ecology are known is H. marmoratus (refer to article for that species).
