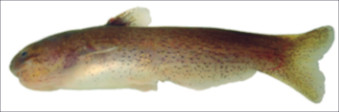
- Denticetopsis seducta

Scientific classification
- Kingdom: Animalia
- Phylum: Chordata
- Class: Actinopterygii
- Order: Siluriformes
- Family: Cetopsidae
- Subfamily: Cetopsinae
- Genus: Denticetopsis; Ferraris, 1996

Type species
- Denticetopsis sauli Ferraris, 1996

Species
- see text

= Denticetopsis =

Genus of fishes

Denticetopsis s a genus of freshwater ray-finned fishes belonging to the family Cetopsidae, the whale catfishes. The fishes in this genus are found in South America.

== Taxonomy ==
Originally Denticetopsis as described by Ferraris in 1996 was restricted to two species, D. royeroi and D. sauli. These two species have proved to be a subunit of a larger clade that also includes two species previously assigned to the now invalid genus Pseudocetopsis (D. macilenta, D. praecox), together with three species described as new in 2005 (D. epa, D. iwokrama, D. seducta).

== Species ==
Denticetopsis contains the following valid species:

- Denticetopsis epa Vari, Ferraris & de Pinna, 2005
- Denticetopsis iwokrama Vari, Ferraris & de Pinna, 2005
- Denticetopsis macilenta (C. H. Eigenmann, 1912)
- Denticetopsis praecox (Ferraris & B. A. Brown, 1991)
- Denticetopsis royeroi Ferraris, 1996
- Denticetopsis sauli Ferraris, 1996
- Denticetopsis seducta Vari, Ferraris & de Pinna, 2005

== Distribution ==
Denticetopsis species are distributed in northern South America where they are found distributed between Venezuela, Guyana and Brazil.

== Description ==
Denticetopsis can be distinguished from other genera of Cetopsinae by a number of characteristics. The margin of the caudal fin is either shallowly forked and symmetrical or obliquely truncate. The outer most rays are no more than one and one-half times the length of the inner most rays; in other genera of Cetopsinae, these rays are one and three-quarters to two times the length of the innermost rays. The medial most pelvic-fin ray has a membranous attachment to the body for the basal third to fourth of its length instead of the basal-most half of its length.

The possession of a first pectoral-fin ray that is spinous for the basal one-half of its length further separates Denticetopsis from Cetopsis and Paracetopsis, both of which lack a spinous first pectoral-fin ray. Denticetopsis is further distinguished from Cetopsidium in the lack of the dorsal-spine locking mechanism and in the having a lateral line extending either only onto the abdomen or distinctly further posteriorly onto the caudal peduncle, instead of terminating above the base of the anal fin.

Most Denticetopsis have a moderately elongate body (though moderately stout in D. macilenta and deep in D. royeroi) that is slightly compressed (laterally or transversely, depending on species) anteriorly and becoming progressively distinctly compressed posteriorly. The body depth at the dorsal fin origin is usually about one-quarter of the fish's standard length, but can be as low as one-fifth and as high as almost one-third. In most species, the lateral line is complete, unbranched in midlateral, extending from the vertical through the pectoral fin base to the caudal peduncle; however, in D. royeroi and D. sauli, it is incomplete, interrupted, and restricted to the abdomen. The dorsal profile of the body tends to be nearly straight to slightly convex; the ventral profile is slightly convex to convex at the abdomen and is usually approximately straight but posterodorsally slanted along the base of the anal fin.

Except for D. macilenta which has a distinctly rounded head and snout, the head of Denticetopsis species in profile is acutely triangular overall with a bluntly pointed snout. The eyes are situated on the sides of the head and are visible from above but not from below. The mouth is inferior, the width from approximately one-half to two-thirds of the length of the head. In most species of Denticetopsis, the medial mental barbels are slightly shorter than the lateral mental barbels, with the latter approximately equal in length to the slender maxillary barbels. However, in C. sauli both pairs of mental barbels are approximately the same length and shorter than the maxillary barbels, and in C. royeroi all three pairs of barbels are approximately the same length.

The dorsal fin is moderately large overall. The dorsal fin spinelet is absent. The anal fin base is usually moderately long but may be long. The pelvic fins are usually moderate but may be moderately long, though in D. sauli they are short. The pectoral fin length is about one-half the length of the head length.

Denticetopsis species range from 1.8–6.7 centimetres (.71–2.6 in) SL.

Sexual dimorphism in the shape of the dorsal, pectoral, and anal fins has not been described in species of Denticetopsis, despite the presence of these traits in Cetopsis and Cetopsidium. It is possible that male D. praecox reach sexual maturity at a smaller size than females of the same species.

== Ecology ==
D. praecox have been found in a cobble-pebble habitat of black water streams that ranged in pH from 4.3–5.0. Stomachs of two examined specimens of this species contained larval chironomids and other larval insect remains.
