= Murrays Fall =

- Location within Guyana
- Location: Essequibo River
- Coordinates: 03°32′00″N 58°17′00″W

Murrays Fall is a waterfall on the Essequibo River, Guyana, approximately 55 km south of the confluence with the Rupununi River.

It is situated 3 km. downstream from the Trinity Rapids, and is the first river obstacle on the Essequibo from Apoteri.
