= Konawaruk River =

River in Guyana

The Konawaruk River is a river in Potaro-Siparuni, Guyana. About 60 miles (97 km) long, it is a tributary of the Essequibo River, joining it just south of the Potaro River mouth at 5°18′N 58°55′W.

About 2 miles (3.2 km) from the confluence at the Essequibo, is Temple Bar falls.

Mining, especially for gold, was the primary industry along the river as early as 1900, and being mined by British Guiana Consolidated Enterprise Limited in the 1950s. In 2003, an assessment by United Development International "verified reserves of over 400,000 ounces of gold" in the claim encompassing the Konawaruk. Extracting the gold polluted the river and as a result environmentalists have considered it "dead" for its inability to support wildlife. Illegal dredging operations are a constant threat.
