= Denticetopsis sauli =

Conservation status
- Data Deficient (IUCN 3.1)

Scientific classification
- Kingdom: Animalia
- Phylum: Chordata
- Class: Actinopterygii
- Order: Siluriformes
- Family: Cetopsidae
- Genus: Denticetopsis
- Species: D. sauli

Binomial name
- Denticetopsis sauli Ferraris, 1996

Species of fish

Denticetopsis sauli is a species of freshwater ray-finned fish belonging to the family Cetopsidae, the whale catfishes. This fish is endemic to Venezuela where it is only known from the Pamoni River in the upper Rio Negro system. This demersal fish grows to a standard length of 2.1 cm (0.83 in).
