= Cetopsidium =

Scientific classification
- Kingdom: Animalia
- Phylum: Chordata
- Class: Actinopterygii
- Order: Siluriformes
- Family: Cetopsidae
- Subfamily: Cetopsinae
- Genus: Cetopsidium; Vari, Ferraris & de Pinna, 2005

Type species
- Pseudocetopsis orientale Vari, Ferraris & Keith, 2003

Genus of fishes

Cetopsidium is a genus of freshwater ray-finned fishes belonging to the family Cetopsidae, the whale catfishes. The fishes in this genus are found in South America.

== Taxonomy ==
Cetopsidium was described in 2005, its name coming from the Cetopsis, the first described cetopsid genus, and idium which means diminutive, in reference to the relatively small size of Cetopsidium species. Three existing species were transferred to this genus and three new species were described. In 2009 a new species, Cetopsidium soniae, was described bringing the number of species in the genus to seven.

== Species ==
Cetopsidium contains the following valid species:

- Cetopsidium ferreirai Vari, Ferraris & de Pinna, 2005
- Cetopsidium minutum (C. H. Eigenmann, 1912)
- Cetopsidium morenoi (Fernández-Yépez, 1972)
- Cetopsidium orientale (Vari, Ferraris & Keith, 2003)
- Cetopsidium pemon Vari, Ferraris & de Pinna, 2005
- Cetopsidium roae Vari, Ferraris & de Pinna, 2005
- Cetopsidium soniae Vari & Ferraris, 2009

== Distribution ==
Fishes of this genus are found in the rivers of northern South America.

== Description ==
The combination of the presence of a dorsal fin with an ossified spinelet and the presence of pectoral-fin and dorsal-fin spines distinguishes the species of Cetopsidium from all other genera in the Cetopsinae. A lateral line extending to over the posterior portion of the base of the anal fin but falling short of the caudal peduncle is also unique in this genus; the lateral line is usually longer than this, though it is shorter in two species of Denticetopsis. Cetopsidium species have mental barbels extending posteriorly beyond the rear margin of the opercle and a deeply forked, symmetrical caudal-fin margin with the tips of the lobes slightly blunt or rounded.

The body is elongate to moderately robust; anteriorly the body is not compressed much, but becomes progressively compressed posteriorly. The lateral line is incomplete, unbranched, and midlateral. In most species the dorsal profile is straight, though it may be slightly convex from the head to the dorsal fin origin in some species. The ventral profile is slightly convex at the abdomen but is straight posteriorly. The caudal peduncle depth is approximately equal to its length in most species, though the depth is less than the length in C. roae and greater in C. orientale. The eyes are placed on the sides of the head and are visible from above, but not from below. The mouth is subterminal and its width is anywhere between 40–60% of the head length. They have three pairs of barbels, one pair of maxillary barbels and two pairs of mental barbels; the medial mental barbels are slightly shorter than the lateral mental barbels, which are in turn slightly shorter than the slender maxillary barbels. The anal fin is moderately long, beginning about halfway down the body, with the posterior-most anal fin rays with a slight, membranous attachment to the body. The pelvic fins are usually small. The first pectoral fin ray is spinous and is slightly longer than one-half the length of the first branched ray; however, the spine may have a prolonged distal filament in mature males.

Sexual dimorphism is observed in C. ferreirai, C. morenoi, C. orientale, and C. pemon, but not in C. minutum or C. roae. Presumed mature males have the first ray of the dorsal and pectoral fins extended into filaments except in C. ferreirai. Also, the anal fin has a broadly convex margin rather than a straight margin.

Cetopsidium species are smaller than Cetopsis species, growing to only 3.1–5.8 centimetres (1.2–2.3 inches) SL.
