= Essequibo River =

Major river in Guyana

Essequibo River Río Esequibo
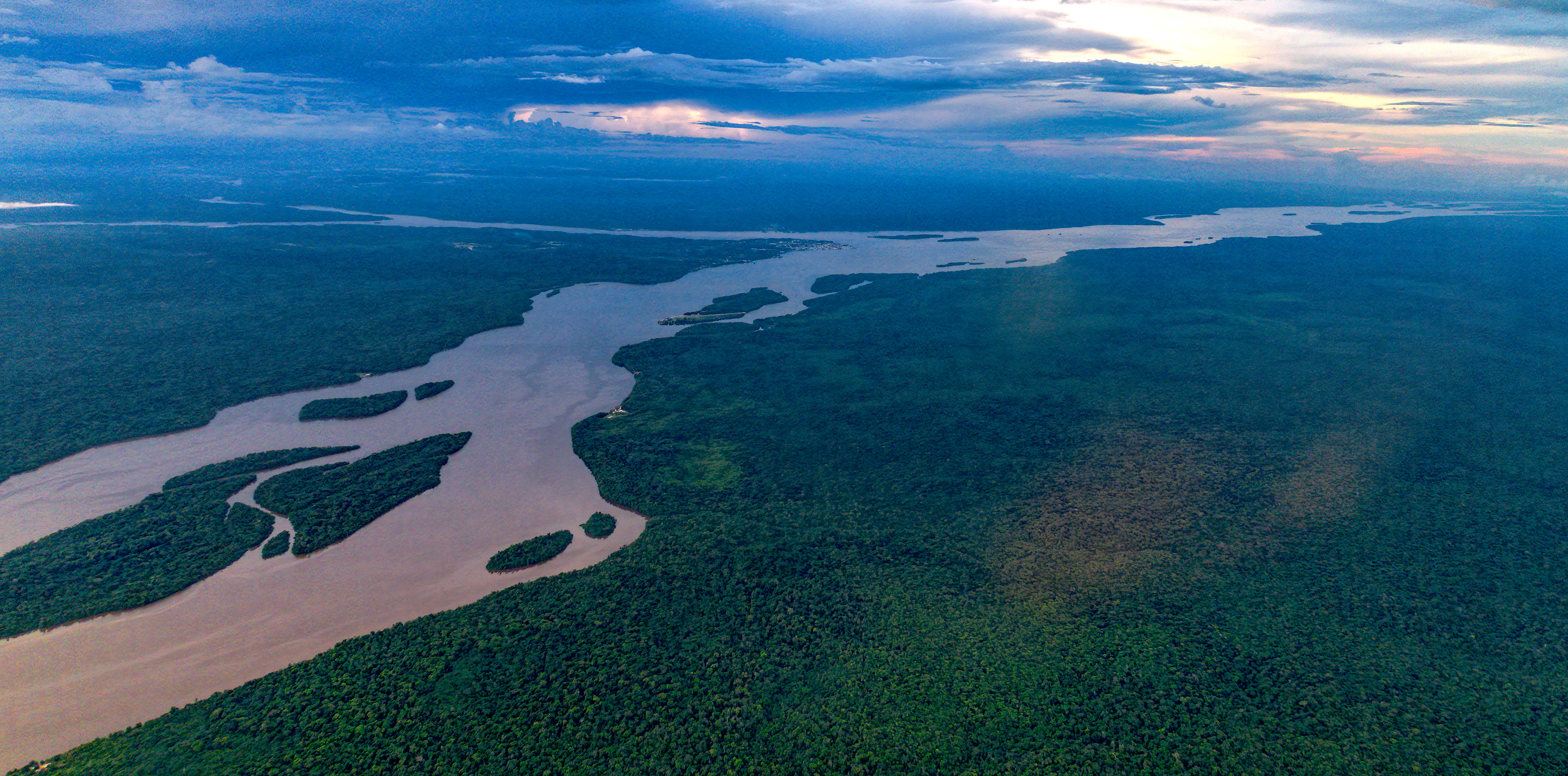
- The Essequibo River in Guyana

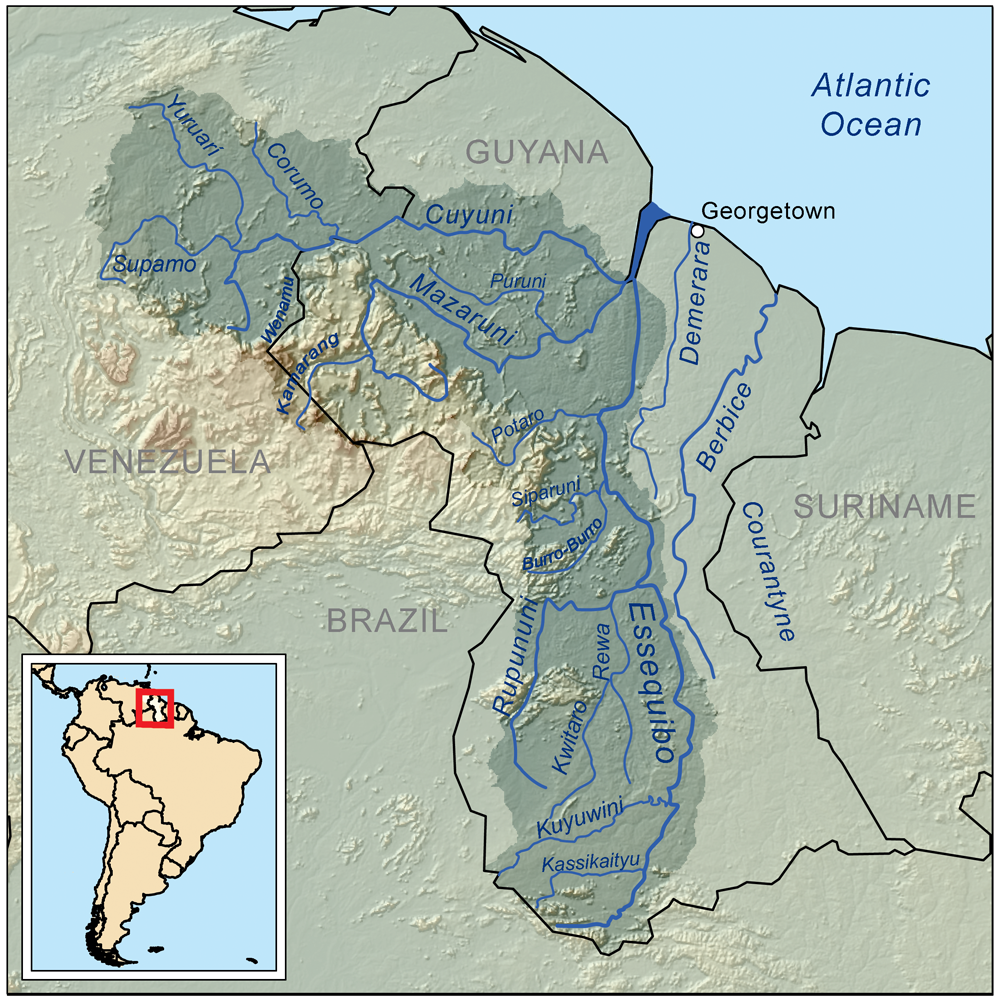
- Map of the Essequibo drainage basin

Location
- Country: Guyana

Physical characteristics
- Source
  - location: Acarai Mountains
  - coordinates: 1°25′2.0532″N 58°59′53.8764″W
  - elevation: 250 m (820 ft)
- Mouth: Atlantic Ocean
  - coordinates: 7°02′N 58°27′W
  - elevation: 0 ft (0 m)
- Length: 1,014 km (630 mi)
- Basin size: 156,828 km^{2} (60,552 mi^{2})
- Discharge
  - location: Near mouth
  - average: 5,088 m^{3}/s (179,700 cu ft/s)

Basin features
- Progression: Atlantic Ocean
- River system: Essequibo River
- Tributaries
  - left: Kamoa, Kassikaityu, Kuyuwini, Rupununi, Siparuni, Konawaruk, Potaro, Cuyuni, Supenaam
  - right: Chodikar

The Essequibo River (Spanish: Río Esequibo; originally called by Alonso de Ojeda; Río Dulce) is the largest river in Guyana, and the largest river between the Orinoco and Amazon. Rising in the Acarai Mountains near the Brazil–Guyana border, the Essequibo flows to the north for 1,014 km (630 mi) through forest and savanna into the Atlantic Ocean. It has a total drainage basin of 156,828 km^{2} (60,552 mi^{2}) and an average discharge of 154 to 178 km³/year.

Territory near the river is argued over by Venezuela and Guyana. The river is administered by Guyana after being previously colonized by the British. Historically, Venezuela has claimed the Essequibo River as their most eastern border, though in practice it was under Dutch control.

== Geography ==
The river runs through the Guianan moist forests ecoregion. The average annual rainfall in the catchment area is 2,174 mm. There are many rapids and waterfalls (e.g., Kaieteur Falls on the Potaro River) along the route of the Essequibo, and its 20-kilometre (12 mi) wide estuary is dotted with numerous small islands. It enters the Atlantic 21 kilometres (13 mi) from Georgetown, the capital city of Guyana. The river features Murrays Fall, Pot Falls, Kumaka Falls, and Waraputa Falls.

Tributaries include the Rupununi, Potaro, Mazaruni, Siparuni, Kuyuwini, Konawaruk and Cuyuni rivers. Islands in the river include Leguan, Wakenaam, and Hogg Island. Sloth Island is an eco-tourism island in the river.

=== Gauging stations ===
Station	River kilometer (rkm)	Elevation (m)	Drainage basin (km^{2})	Average discharge (m^{3}/s) *
Near mouth	0	0	158,232.7	5,136
Bartica	80	1	154,175	5,043.9
Plantain Island	190	15	66,563	2,316.8
Apoteri		78	22,679.1	617.6
^{*} Period: 1971–2000

== Discharge ==
Essequibo River at gauged stations
Year, period	Average discharge	Ref.
Near mouth 6°57′11.8296″N 58°19′57.0972″W
1971–2000	5,136 m^{3}/s (162.1 km^{3}/a)	
1931–1960	5,000 m^{3}/s (160 km^{3}/a)	
	5,640.6 m^{3}/s (178.00 km^{3}/a)	
	4,880.1 m^{3}/s (154.00 km^{3}/a)	
Bartica ¹ 6°26′41.2656″N 58°36′29.2608″W
1979–2015	156.24 km^{3}/a (4,951 m^{3}/s)	
1971–2000	5,043.9 m^{3}/s (159.17 km^{3}/a)	
1965–1998	4,100 m^{3}/s (130 km^{3}/a)	
Plantain Island ² 5°47′49.0128″N 58°36′24.8364″W
1971–2000	2,316.8 m^{3}/s (73.11 km^{3}/a)	
1965–1990	2,104 m^{3}/s (66.4 km^{3}/a)	
	2,832 m^{3}/s (89.4 km^{3}/a)	
	69 km^{3}/a (2,200 m^{3}/s)	
Apoteri 4°2′8.124″N 58°35′1.1436″W
1971–2000	617.6 m^{3}/s (19.49 km^{3}/a)	
Notes: ¹ Minimum and maximum discharge 1,850 to 8,700 m³/s; ² Minimum and maximum discharge 145 to 8,010 m³/s; Average minimum and maximum discharge 761.3 to 4,893.8 m³/s;

=== Tributaries ===
The main tributaries from the mouth:

Left tributary	Right tributary	Length (km)	Basin size (km^{2})	Average discharge (m^{3}/s)
Essequibo		1,014	156,828	5,600
Supenaam			1,041.9	31.6
Cuyuni		618	85,209	2,719.1
Potaro		255	6,842.4	521
Konawaruk		97	873.5	57.1
Siparuni		127	6,762.4	256.3
Rupununi		315	23,684.3	537.7
Kuyuwini		185	4,391.2	123.4
Kassikaityu		95	3,668.5	109.1
Kamoa		69	923.1	27.4
	Sipu	57	1,720.4	51

== Fauna ==
The river has a very rich fauna. More than 300 fish species are known from the Essequibo basin, including almost 60 endemics. This may be an underestimate of the true diversity, as parts of the basin are poorly known. For example, surveys of the upper Mazaruni River found 36–39 species (variation in number due to taxonomy), of which 13–25% still were undescribed in 2013. At least 24 fish species are restricted to Mazaruni River alone.

During floods the headwaters of the Branco River (a part of the Amazon basin) and those of the Essequibo are connected, allowing a level of exchange in the aquatic fauna such as fish between the two systems.

== History ==
=== 15th century ===
The first European discovery was by the ships of Juan de Esquivel, deputy of Don Diego Columbus, son of Christopher Columbus in 1498. The Essequibo River is named after Esquivel. In 1499, Amerigo Vespucci and Alonso de Ojeda explored the mouths of the Orinoco and allegedly were the first Europeans to explore the Essequibo. Alonso de Ojeda called it "Rio Dulce" which means Sweet River in Spanish.

=== 16th century ===
In 1596 Lawrence Kemys, serving as second-in-command of Walter Raleigh's British expedition to Guiana, led a force inland along the banks of the Essequibo River, reaching what he wrongly believed to be Lake Parime. The next year Kemys, in command of the Darling, continued the exploration of the Guiana coast and the Essequibo River.

=== 17th century ===
The first European settlement in Guyana was built by the Dutch along the lower part of the Essequibo in 1615. The Dutch colony of Essequibo was founded in 1616 and located in the region of the Essequibo River that later became part of British Guiana.

The Dutch colonists remained on friendly terms with the Native American peoples of the area, establishing riverside sugarcane and tobacco plantations.

=== 19th century ===
The Dutch deterred many attacks from the British, French and Spanish for nearly two centuries, though they would later cede their territory to the British in 1814.

The Independence war of Venezuela beginning in the 19th century ended the missionary settlements. At this time, Britain needed to have a colony, besides Trinidad, to serve the large trade sailboats on their large travel trading route around South America. Venezuela claims that the Essequibo is the true border between it and Guyana, claiming all territory west of it. The boundary was set between Venezuela and Guyana's then colonial power, Great Britain in 1899 through an arbitration proceeding. A letter written by Venezuela's legal counsel, named partner Severo Mallet-Prevost of New York City law firm Curtis, Mallet-Prevost, Colt & Mosle alleged that the Russian and British judges on the tribunal had acted improperly and granted the lion's share of the disputed territory to Britain due to a political deal between Russia and the United Kingdom. As a result, Venezuela has revived its claim to the disputed territory.

=== 20th century ===
In August 1995, at Omai mine there was an acid spill in the river by the Canadian gold mining company Cambior. An estimated 4 million cubic metres (140,000,000 cu ft) of waste laced with cyanide was released into the river causing much destruction. The spill was preceded by a smaller sodium cyanide spill in May that killed hundreds of fish.

== Expeditions ==
=== 1837-38 ===
Sponsored by the Royal Geographical Society the German researcher Robert Hermann Schomburgk (1804-1865) investigated the river Essequibo and followed its course to the south-west, while Sipu River flows to a westerly direction. He specified the coordinates of the source at 0°41`northern latitude, while not giving a longitude.

=== 1908 ===
In 1908 the German-American ichthyologist Carl H. Eigenmann traveled on river Essequibo and confluent Potaro. He described 336 fish species in these rivers.

=== 1969 ===
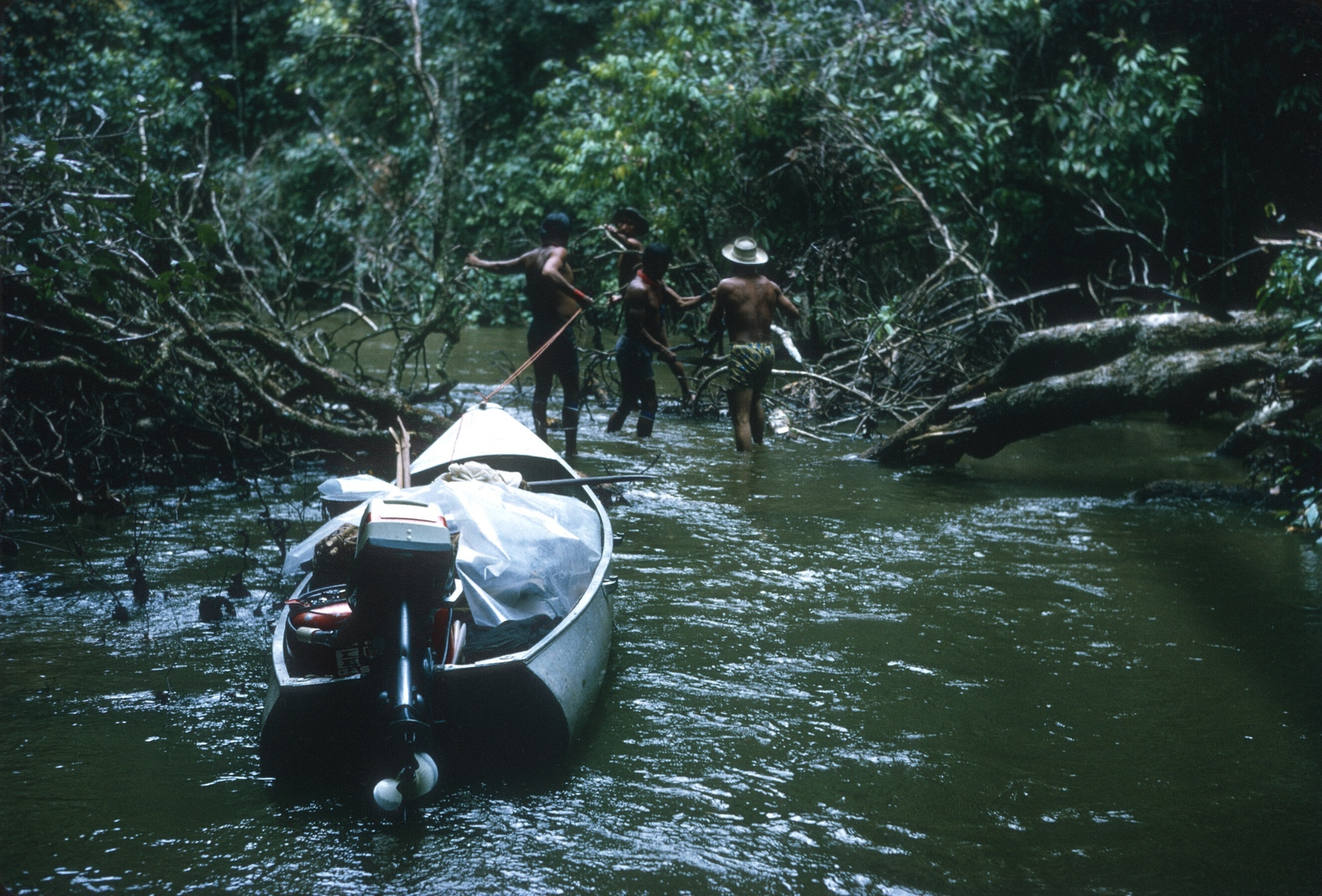
Hauling canoe up the headwaters of the Essequibo River

As part of a British Technical Assistance project "Operation El Dorado", geologists Dr. Jevan P. Berrangé and Dr. Richard L. Johnson made the first topographic and geological maps of Guyana south of latitude 4 degrees north. They examined 1:60,000 scale panchromatic aerial photos with a stereoscope to interpret the physical features and the geology of the region prior to making four expeditions into the field to check their observations. On Expedition III they explored the entire Essequibo basin. They travelled separately in two outboard-powered canoes, each team comprising a geologist and five Amerindians. Starting at Kanashen, they canoed up all the major eastward flowing tributaries: the Kuyuwini, Kassikaityu, Kamoa and Sipu rivers, as well as the Chadikar River which on the basis of its north-south trend and a larger flow of water is considered to be the source of the Essiquibo rather than the eastward flowing Sipu River. In his memoirs Richard Johnson records how he had a line cut through the forest to a small hill near the Chodikar headwaters so that he could stand on the border defined by the watershed, and when he told his line-cutting team that they were looking south across the forest into Brazil his foreman disagreed on the basis that "there are lots of nightclubs in Brazil." After mapping the tributaries the two teams joined forces and travelled down the Essequibo to its confluence with the Rupununi river at Apoteri.

=== 1971 ===
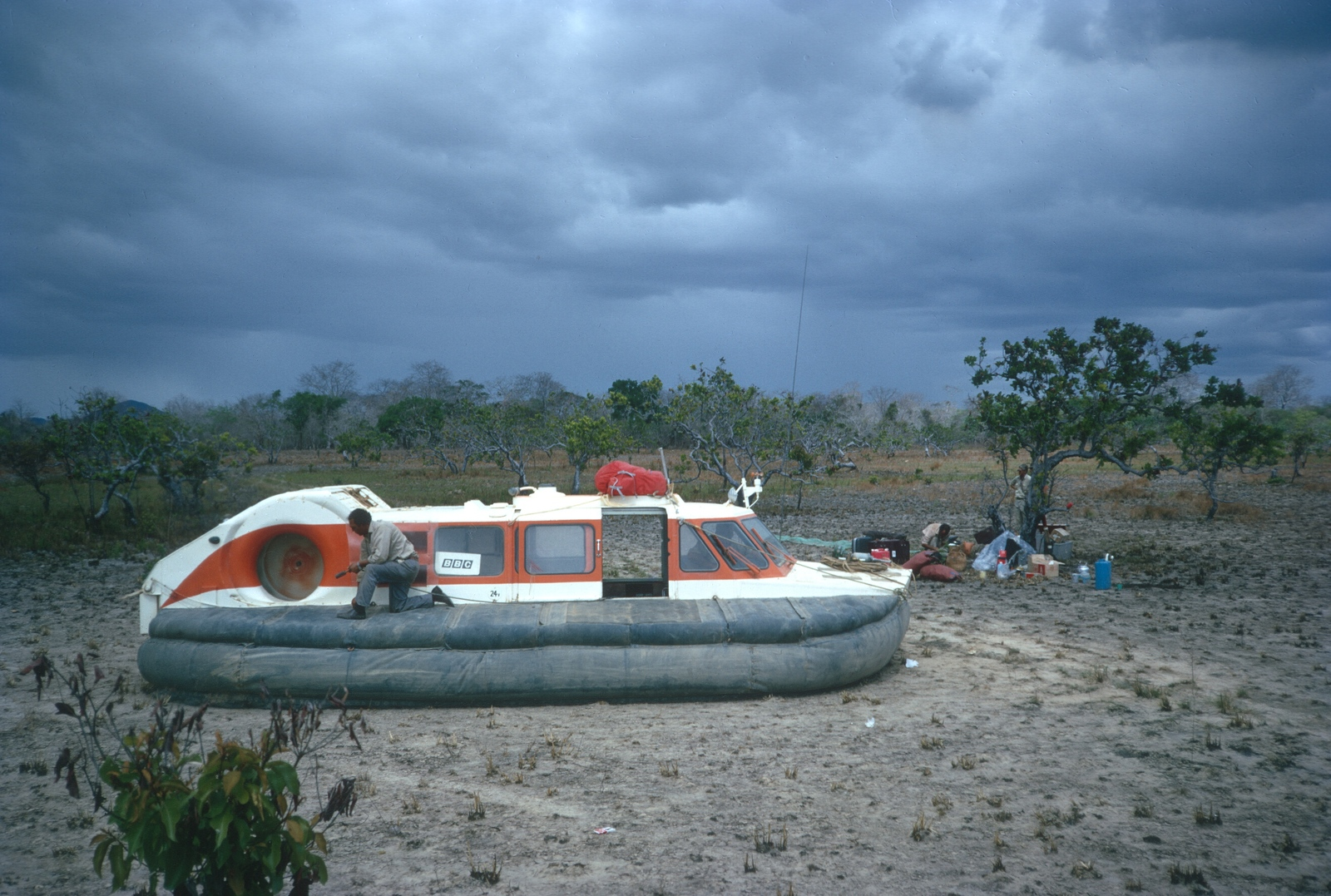
CushionCraft CC7 hovercraft in North Savannas of Guyana during the filming of "The World About Us: The Forbidden Route".

On February 26, 1971, an expedition set off by hovercraft from Manaus in Brazil where the Amazon River is joined by the Rio Negro. They followed the Negro upstream to where it is joined by the Rio Ireng that forms the border between Brazil and Guyana. After following the Ireng for a few tens of kilometers they hovered about 40 miles across the North Savannas of Guyana to the Rupununi River, which they followed to its confluence with the Essequibo River at Apoteri. The Essequibo was then traversed down to its mouth near Georgetown. The primary purpose of the expedition was filming for the BBC series "The World About Us" with the episode "The Forbidden Route" broadcast in November 1971. The secondary purpose was to demonstrate the abilities of a new type of small hovercraft, the Cushioncraft CC7, thereby promoting sales of this British invention. The expedition team comprised Bob Saunders (BBC producer and team leader), Tommy Tomlinson (CC7 pilot), Jevan Berrangé (navigator and logistics consultant), Len Chrisophers (hovercraft engineer), Peter Smith (sound recordist), and Tony Morrison (cameraman). Fuel dumps for the hovercraft were laid down at intervals ahead of the expedition, by boat on the Rio Negro, by plane in the North Savannas and by float-plane on the Essequibo. As there were no reliable maps of the route, navigation in Guyana was done by 1:60,000 scale aerial photographs and by scouting rapids in a motorised inflatable dinghy ahead of the CC7. This was the first expedition to travel by river, land, and sea from Manaus to Georgetown, a total distance of about 1,000 miles (1,600 km).

=== 2013 ===
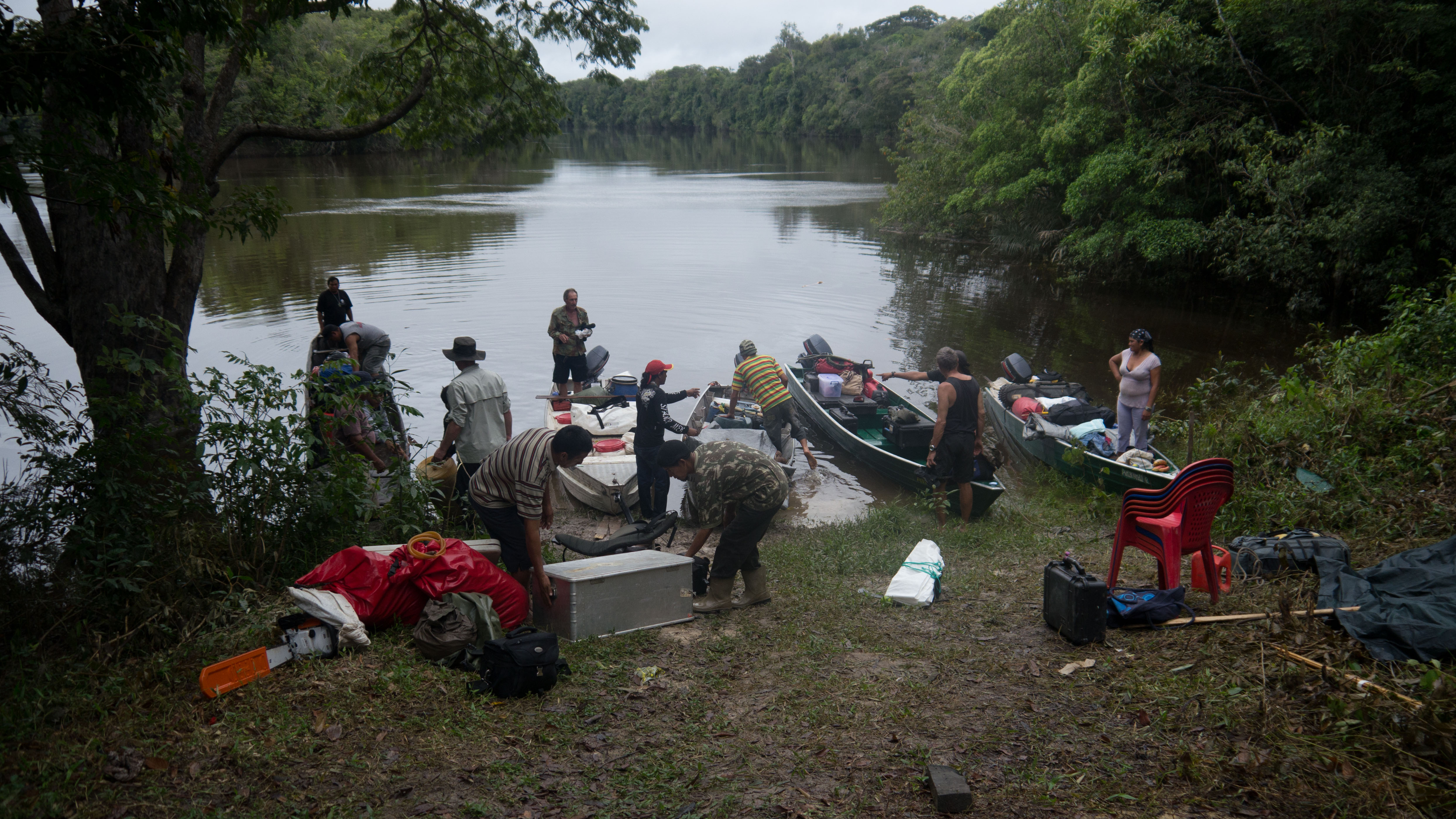
Leaving Gunns to the unexplored wilderness

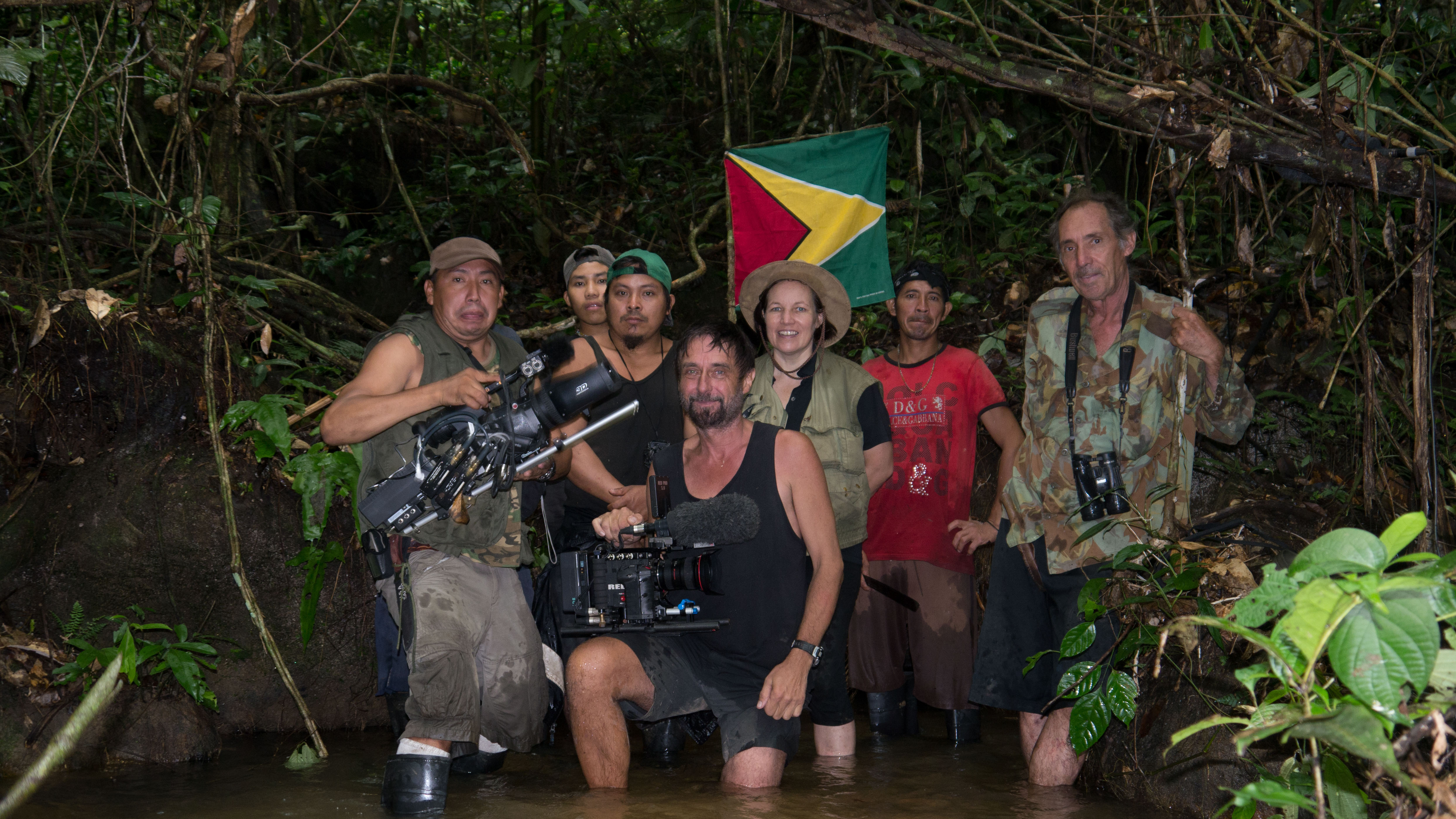
The Expedition team at the source of Sipu river

A Guyanese-German expedition in Guyana in April and May 2013 followed the course of the Sipu River to detect the still unknown headwaters of the Essequibo. It was sponsored by the French-German TV Company ARTE and was organized by Duane De Freitas (Rupununi Trails) and the film production team of Marion Pöllmann and Rainer Bergomaz (Blue Paw Artists). The responsible scientist for remote sensing, geodesy and mapping was Prof. Dr. Martin Oczipka from the University of Applied Sciences Dresden (HTW Dresden). The expedition was only realizable with the support of the Guyanese government and the indigenous tribe of Wai-Wai-Amerindian settling in the very south of Guyana.

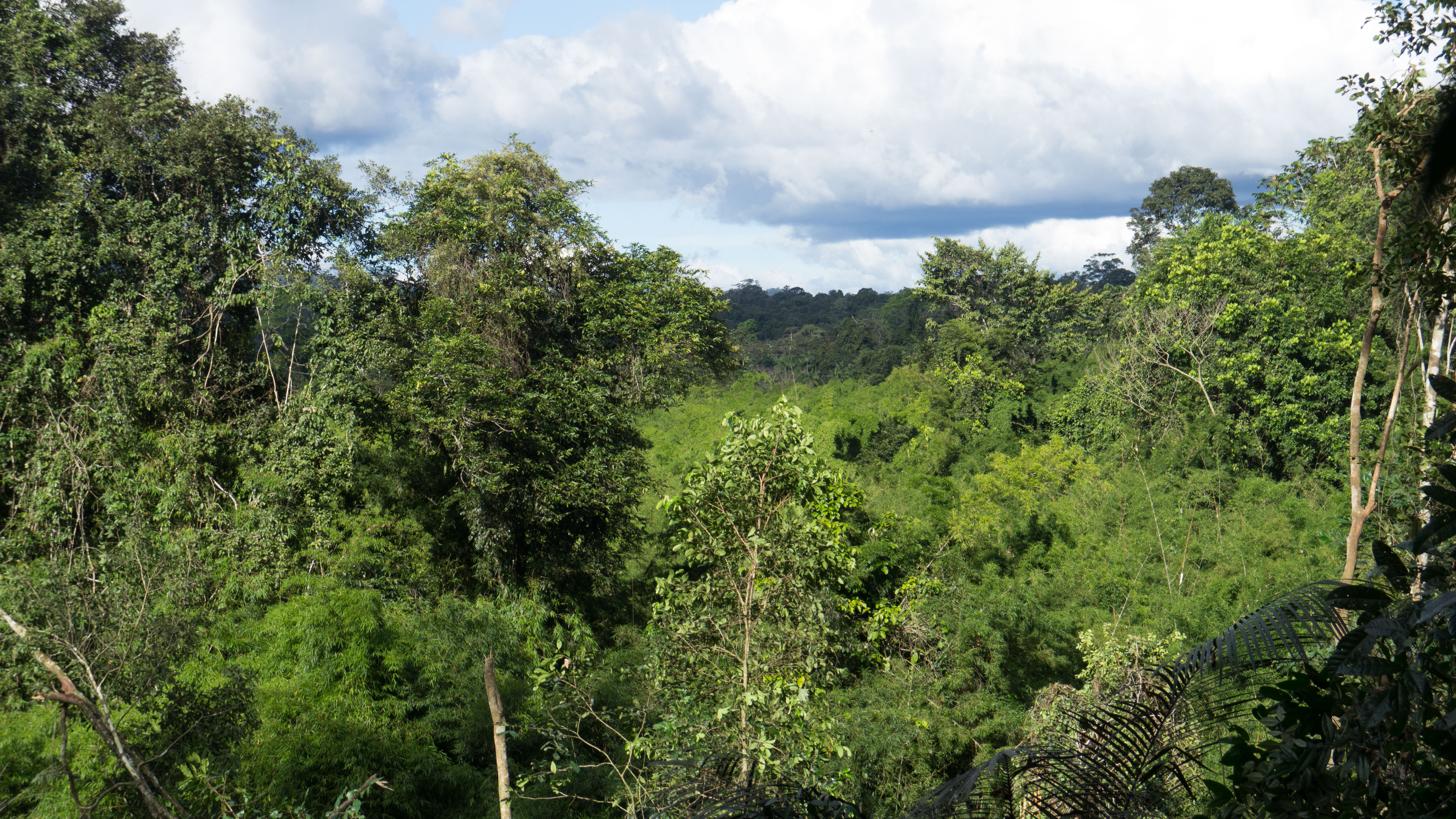
close to the source area of Sipu river

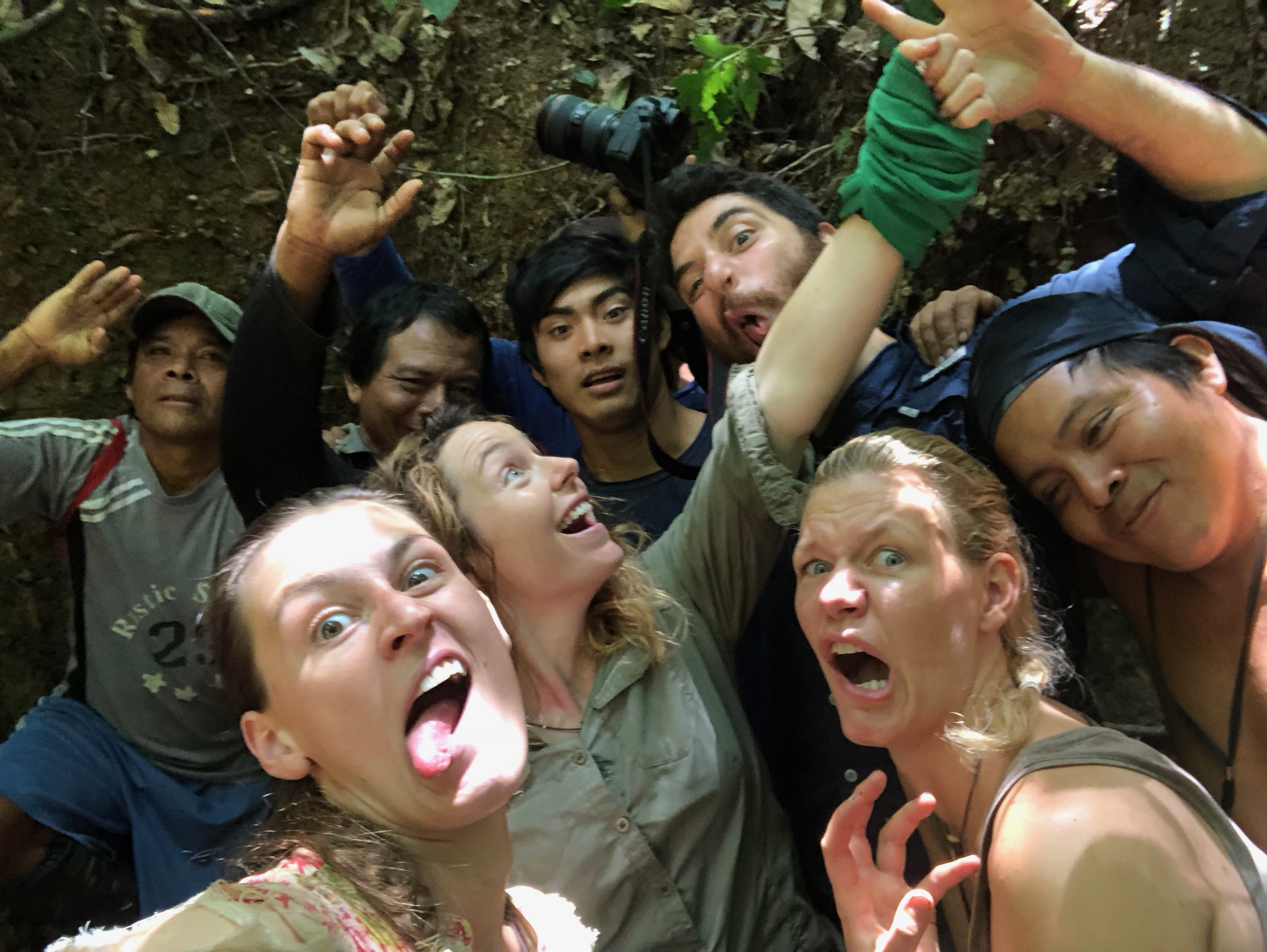
The team at the furthest source of the Essequibo River aka the Sipu River

With the support of the Wai-Wai, satellite maps, topographic maps, GPS and a small drone, the source valley was discovered in 2013. The coordinate determined by expedition teams in 2013 deviates by approximately 40`, which corresponds to a distance of at least 80 km north. This could be caused by calculation errors or other mistakes. Possibly he followed a different branch of the river more in the South of Guyana. To further investigate this, additional research is necessary, preferably in the original reports of Robert Hermann Schomburgk from his expedition in 1837/38. For the accurate determination of the headwaters and their proper classification, further extensive geological and hydrological studies are necessary.

=== 2018 ===
In 2018, with the support of the First Lady, Sandra Granger, a group consisting of five Wai-wai, two English, one Iranian, and one South African located the furthest source of the Essequibo River. They built upon information and experience from the above 2013 Guyanese German expedition alongside topographical maps, local Wai Wai knowledge, GPS, and machetes to follow the Sipu River to its source. The multinational team 'Running the Essequibo' followed the main channel and investigated tributaries until they reached the watershed. There, 20 metres away from the Brazilian border, they logged what is now acknowledged to be the furthest source of the Essequibo River.

GPS co-ordinates: N1° 24.5243', W59° 16.5107'

The team then began their world-first descent of the Essequibo River. The team of nine paddled back to Kanashan, aka Gunns Strip, where the Wai Wai members returned home and Romel Shoni and Anthony Shushu joined the expedition. This team, accompanied later further downriver by Fay James (Macushi people), then paddled the remaining distance to the mouth of the Essequibo where it meets the Atlantic Ocean.

This expedition lasted a total of 10 weeks.

Team members: Laura Bingham (expedition leader), Ness Knight, Pip Stewart, Peiman Zekavat (film director), Jon Williams (cameraman), Nereus Chekema, Nigel Isaacs, Jackson (Elijah) Marawanaru, Aron Marawanaru, James Suse, Fay James, Romel Shoni, and Anthony Shushu.

== See also ==
- Rappu Falls
