= Siparuni River =

River in Guyana

Coordinates: 4°50′N 58°50′W

The Siparuni River is a river in the Potaro-Siparuni Region of Guyana. It is a tributary of the Essequibo River. Tributaries of the Siparuni River include the Takutu River, Burro-Burro River, Tipuru River and Levai Creek.

Archaic petroglyphs have been recorded in a number of locations on the Siparuni River, including Big "S" Falls, as well as artificial stone depressions and sharpening grooves are located at Electric Eel Rock, and Tapir Rock. These sites are between 3,500 and 7,000 years old, also known as the Archaic Period.

Like many of Guyana's waterways, the Siparuni is used for gold mining, and illegal dredging operations are a problem in the protected areas. It is the northern border of the protected Iwokrama forest.

It is an important water source for Macushi people of the Surama village, who undertake periodic, extended fishing trips at the river. Fish are then smoked or salted for short-term preservation. Mining has been viewed as having a negative impact on this practice, by decreasing the abundance of fish and threatening this food source.
