= Kassikaityu River =

River in Guyana

Location
- Country: Guyana

Physical characteristics
- Mouth
  - location: Essequibo River
  - coordinates: 1.8469°N 59.1957°E

The Kassikaityu River is a tributary of the Essequibo River of Guyana.

There are a few different theories on the name of the river, one is that it is named for a local variety of catfish, called kassi. Also, according to Barrington Brown (the first European to record Kaieteur Falls) it is an Amerindian name meaning 'river of death' and more specifically, Robert Hermann Schomburgk said the name is a corruption of the Taruma name casi-kityu meaning 'dead river'.

== Description ==
The Kassikaityu River is one of the larger tributaries of the Essequibo and about 30 m (98 ft) wide near its mouth and about 15 m (49 ft) at the confluence between the South and West Kassikaityu Rivers 95 km (59 mi) from the mouth. For the lowest 12 km (7.5 mi), the river winds over a wide floodplain, and is regularly navigated by the Wai Wai to reach the trail to Karaudanawa. The Wailturan Rapids are 34 km (21 mi) above the mouth. The South and West Kassikaityu Rivers were penetrated with extensive cutting to points respectively 32 and 38 km (20 and 24 mi) from their confluence.

The water level of the Kassikaityu falls to its lowest annual levels between the end of the minor rainy period in January and the beginning of the main rainy season at the end of March. Water levels vary from a minimum 225.62 m (740.2 ft) to maximum 235.23 m (771.8 ft) (average 228.36 m [749.2 ft]) During dry seasons the low water level can make travel difficult because there are more rapids.

== History ==
The river and surrounding areas were once inhabited by the Taruma people, who came to the area in the early 18th century, but were wiped out from influenza. Subsequently, the Kassikaityu area is referred to by the Wai-wais as the ‘River of the Dead.’

In 1934, the British Guiana-Brazil Boundary Commission was set up to survey the boundary reached the upper Essequibo, until the team was impacted by beri-beri and were medically evacuated from the area, one who died was buried on the right bank of the Kassikaityu River. The commission's work recommenced in 1935 and the British contingent was led by the Army's Royal Engineers.

In 2014, plans were made to construct a tractor trail from Parabara to the Kassikaityu River landing for the benefit of Wai-Wai people to connect to the Rupununi. The distance was surveyed in 2010, as well as a medical mission for the remote Wai Wai who live in the deep south of Guyana.

== Settlements ==
Kanashen, a community-protected area of the Wai-Wai people is accessible by the Kassikaityu. It is one of the most remote areas of Guyana, and in addition to practicing traditional ways of life, engage in sustainable tourism. Canoeing the Kassikaityu is a promoted activity.

== See also ==
- List of rivers of Guyana
