= Kuyuwini River =

Coordinates: 2°12′30″N 58°28′30″W

Location
- Country: Guyana

The Kuyuwini River is a river in Guyana.

Marudi Mountain is a critical watershed that feeds into the river.

The area surrounding the river is considered traditional lands of the Wapishana, who monitor the river for environmental threats. Conrad Gorinsky was born in Parubaru, a settlement near the Kuyuwini.

The river is often used for mining. Illegal mining is a problem in the area, and mining is prohibited under the fourth parallel.

== See also ==
- List of rivers of Guyana
- Mining in Guyana

== Bibliography ==
- Rand McNally, The New International Atlas, 1993.
