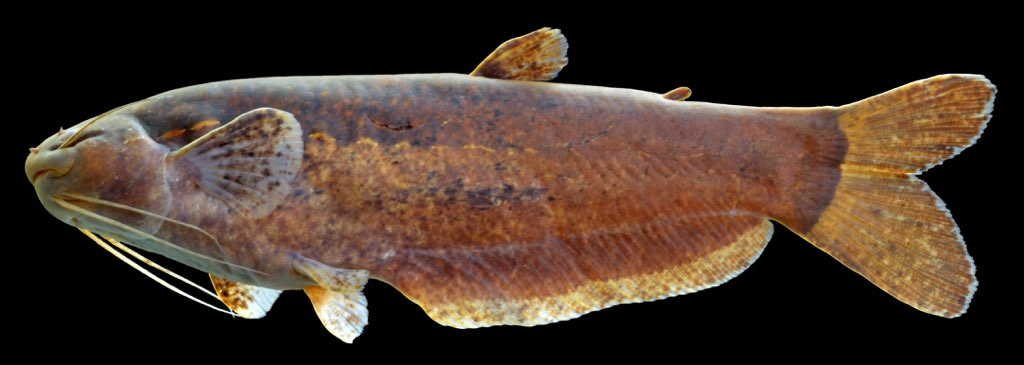
- Helogenes marmoratus

Scientific classification
- Kingdom: Animalia
- Phylum: Chordata
- Class: Actinopterygii
- Division: Teleostei
- Order: Siluriformes
- Suborder: Cetopsoidei de Pinna, 1998
- Family: Cetopsidae; Bleeker, 1858

Subfamiles and genera
- see text

= Cetopsidae =

Whale catfishes

Family of fishes

The Cetopsidae, the whale catfishes are a small family of freshwater ray-finned fishes belonging to the order Siluriformes. The fishes in this family are found in South America.

== Taxonomy ==
This family contains five genera divided into two subfamilies, Cetopsinae and Helogeneinae. Helogeneinae was previously a family-level group, but now it has been reclassified as a subfamily of Cetopsidae. This subfamily contains four species in the genus Helogenes. The subfamily Cetopsinae contains four genera. Cetopsidium contains six species, Cetopsis contains 21 species, Denticetopsis contains seven species, and Paracetopsis contains three species; this makes a total of 37 cetopsines. The genera have been changed as recently as 2005 with the genera Bathycetopsis, Hemicetopsis, and Pseudocetopsis set in synonymy with Cetopsis and the description of the new genus Cetopsidium.

Cetopsidium is the sister group to the rest of Cetopsinae. Denticetopsis forms the next sister group to the remaining cetopsine genera. The tribes Cetopsidiini, Denticetopsini, and Cetopsini are erected for the cetopsine genera.

=== Classification ===
Cetopsidae is classified as follows:

- Subfamily Cetopsinae Bleeker, 1858 (whalelike catfishes)
  - Genus Cetopsidium Vari, Ferraris & de Pinna, 2005
  - Genus Cetopsis Agassiz, 1829
  - Genus Denticetopsis Ferraris, 1996
  - Genus Paracetopsis Bleeker, 1862
- Subfamily Helogeninae Regan 1911 (driftwood marbled catfishes)
  - Genus Helogenes Günther, 1863

== Distribution ==
Cetopsids have a wide distribution in South America. Latitudinally, cetopsines extend from northern Colombia to central Argentina. They inhabit major habitats such as the Orinoco River, Amazon River, and the Guyanas. In trans-Andean South America, cetopsines are found along the Pacific slope from the Jurubidá River of Colombia south to the Tumbes River of northern Peru. Along the Caribbean trans-Andean versant, species of cetopsines occur from the Sinú River of northwestern Colombia east to the Lake Maracaibo basin of northwestern Venezuela. East of the Andean Cordilleras, the Cetopsinae occur in the Aroa and Yaracuy River basins along the Caribbean versant of northern Venezuela, through the Orinoco River system and the coastal rivers of the Guianas, south through the Amazon basin to the southern portions of the Río de la Plata basin. Cetopsines also occur in the Juquiá River basin of the state of São Paulo and the São Francisco River basin of eastern Brazil. Helogenes, the single genus of Helogeneinae, occurs through much of the Amazon basin, the southern portions of the Orinoco River basin, the coastal rivers of the Guianas, and at least the lower portions of the Tocantins River.

== Description ==
The family Cetopsidae includes species of small- to medium-sized catfishes which share an anal fin with a long base, the lack of nasal barbels, and, usually, a lack of dorsal and pectoral fin spines. In Cetopsinae, the swim bladder is highly reduced and is enclosed in a bony capsule. Cetopsines lack an adipose fin, while it may be present (though small) in Helogeneinae. Many species are characterized by small eyes obscured by a thick, overlying integument that make them appear blind. The dorsal and pectoral fins usually lack spines, except in Cetopsidium (both present) and Denticetopsis (only pectoral spines present). In most species of Cetopsis and Cetopsidium, mature males have a convex margin to their anal fin and elongated distal filaments of the dorsal and pectoral fin spines.

The maximum length of this family is about 26 cm (10 in) SL in Cetopsinae. Cetopsidium species are generally smaller in body size than Cetopsis. The maximum length in Helogenes species is 7 cm (2.8 in).

== Ecology ==
Most cetopsids feed on insects. C. candiru and C. coecutiens are well known to have extremely voracious appetites; these species will attack carrion, other living fish trapped in gillnets, and even people. Some people erroneously believe these fish are parasitic like parasitic catfishes, as they are also referred to as "candiru".
