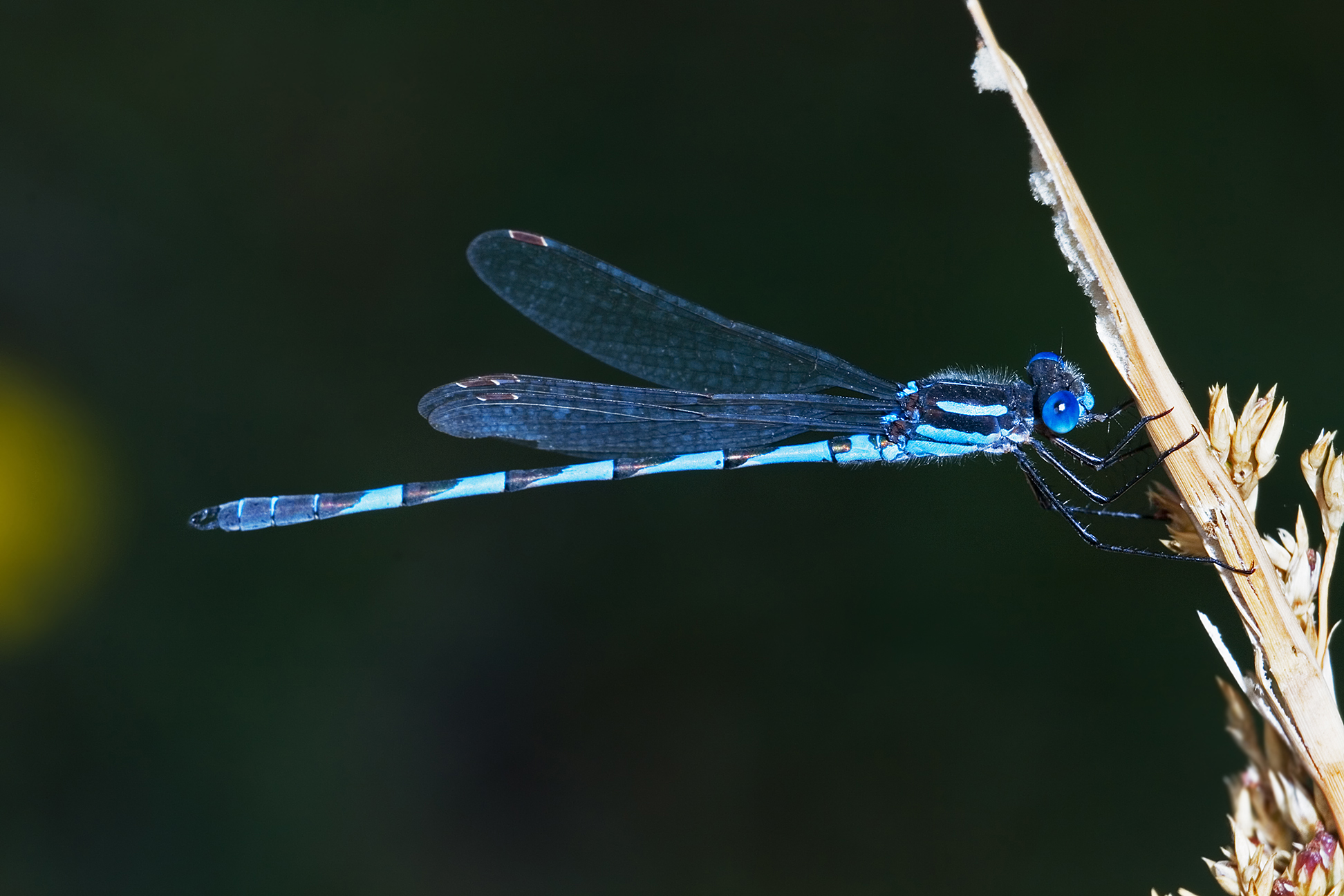
- Male, Tasmania, Australia
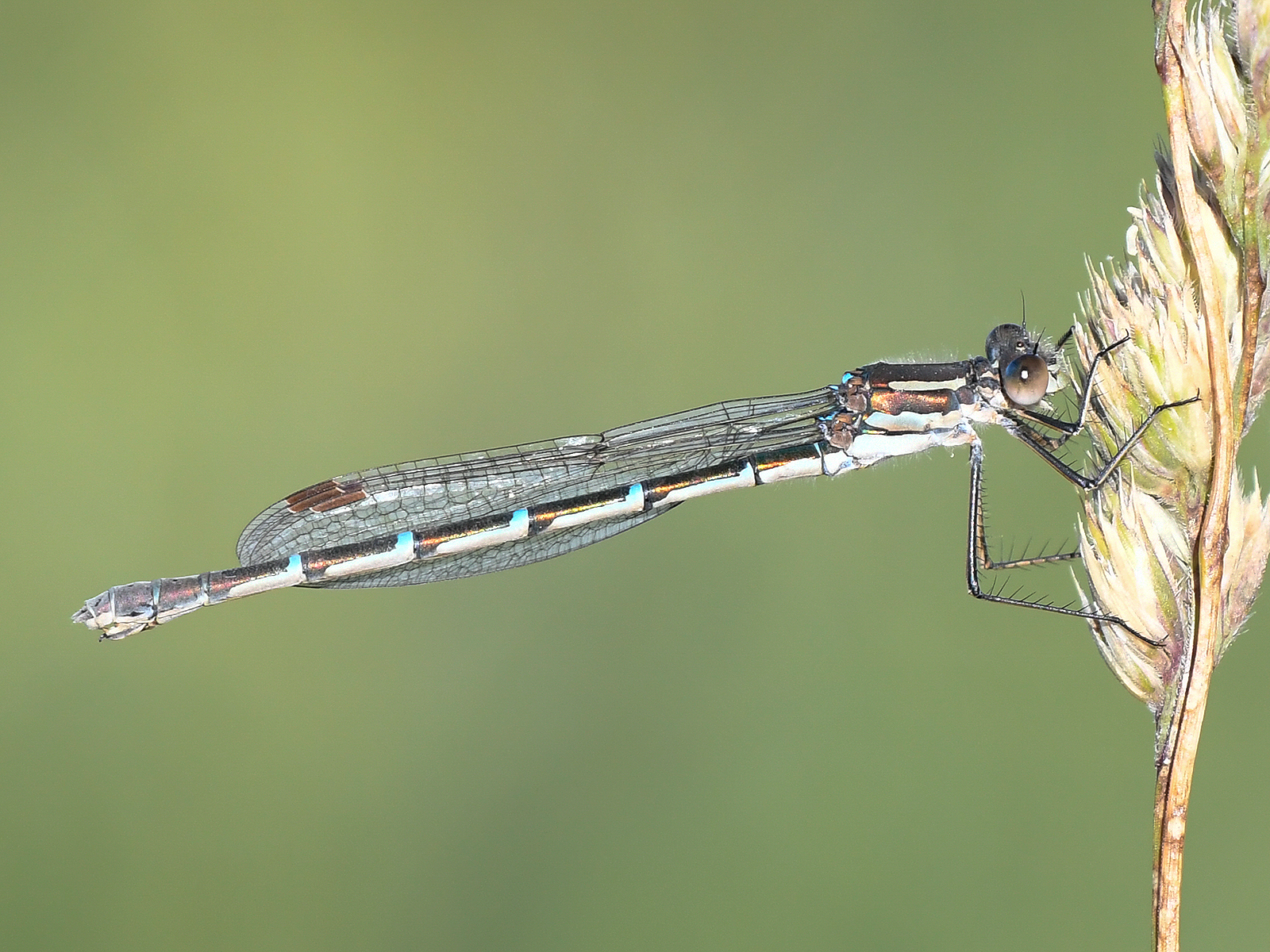
- Female, Tasmania, Australia

Conservation status
- Least Concern (IUCN 3.1)

Scientific classification
- Kingdom: Animalia
- Phylum: Arthropoda
- Clade: Pancrustacea
- Class: Insecta
- Order: Odonata
- Suborder: Zygoptera
- Family: Lestidae
- Genus: Austrolestes
- Species: A. annulosus

Binomial name
- Austrolestes annulosus (Selys, 1862)

Synonyms
- Lestes annulosa Selys, 1862

= Blue ringtail =

Species of damselfly

The blue ringtail (Austrolestes annulosus) is an Australian damselfly. It is found on most of the continent.

== Taxonomy ==
The blue ringtail was first described by Edmond de Sélys Longchamps in 1862.

== Description ==
The abdomen is 3 cm long. It can easily be confused with Austrocoenagrion lyelli or Caliagrion billinghursti, but can be differentiated through dorsal patterns. They are a thin, medium-sized damselfly with varying coloration, which depends on maturity and temperature. However most are a striking blue with minimal black markings. Females are slightly more robust than males, and have a black and white/pale blue coloration.

== Distribution and habitat ==
It is widely distributed in most of Australia, except for the northern and north-eastern parts. It is active through September to April in still water bodies such as riverine pools, lakes and ponds, including temporary pools.

== Etymology ==
The genus name Austrolestes combines the prefix austro- (from Latin auster, meaning “south wind”, hence “southern”) with Lestes, a genus name derived from Greek λῃστής (lēstēs, “robber”).

The species name annulosus is derived from the Latin annulus ("ring") and the suffix -osus ("abounding in"), referring to the broad ring on the second abdominal segment.

== Gallery ==
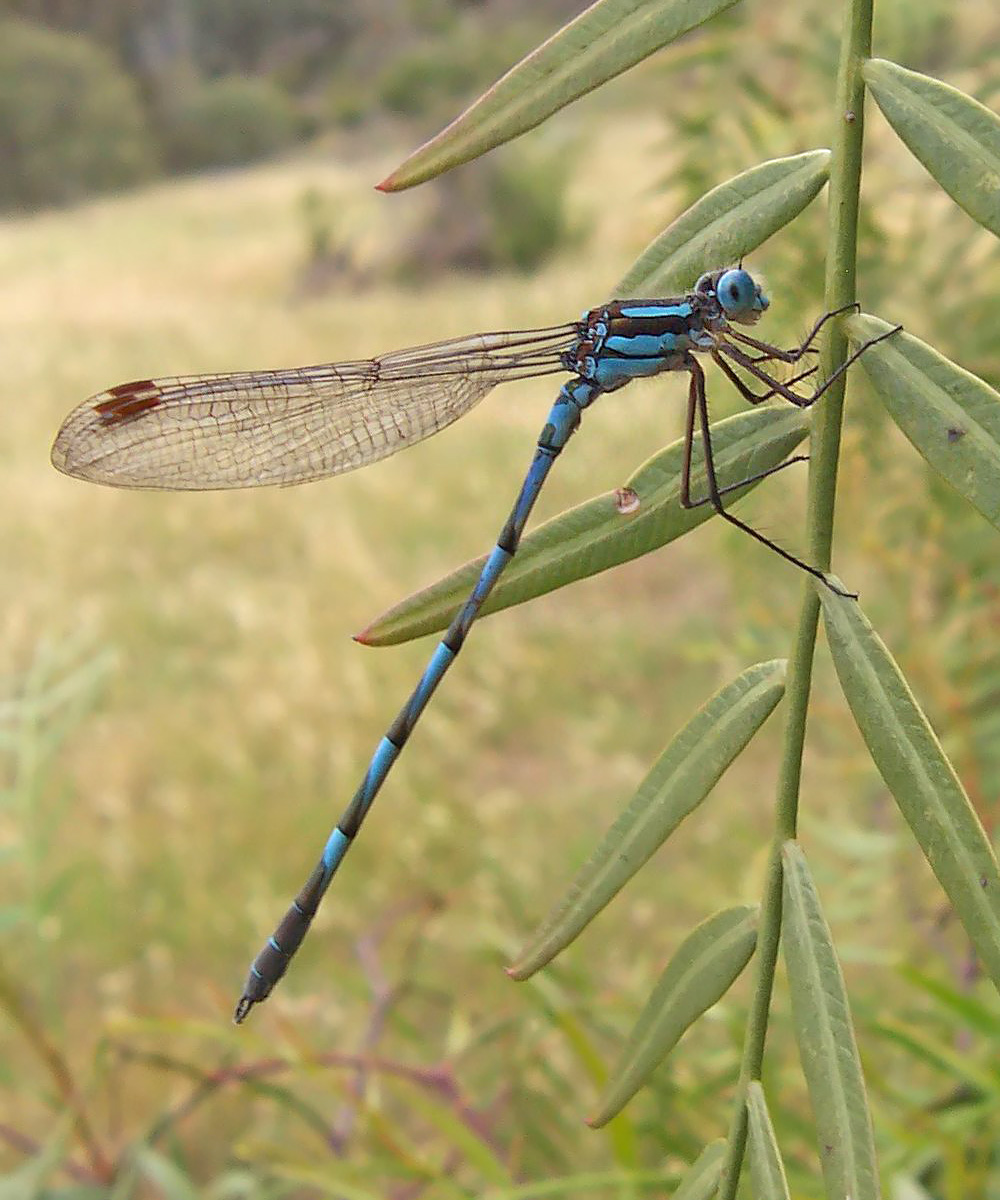
Male

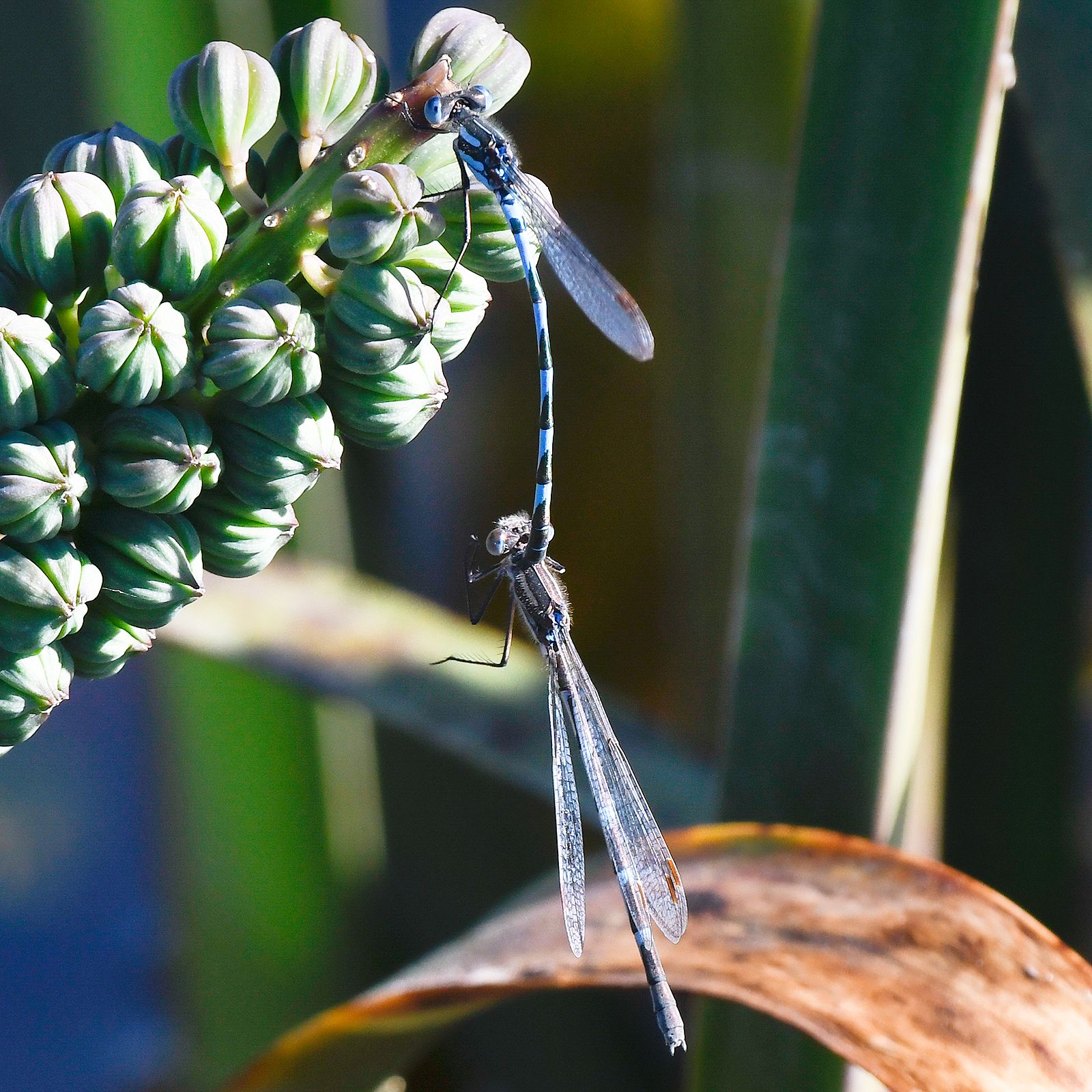
Mating pair

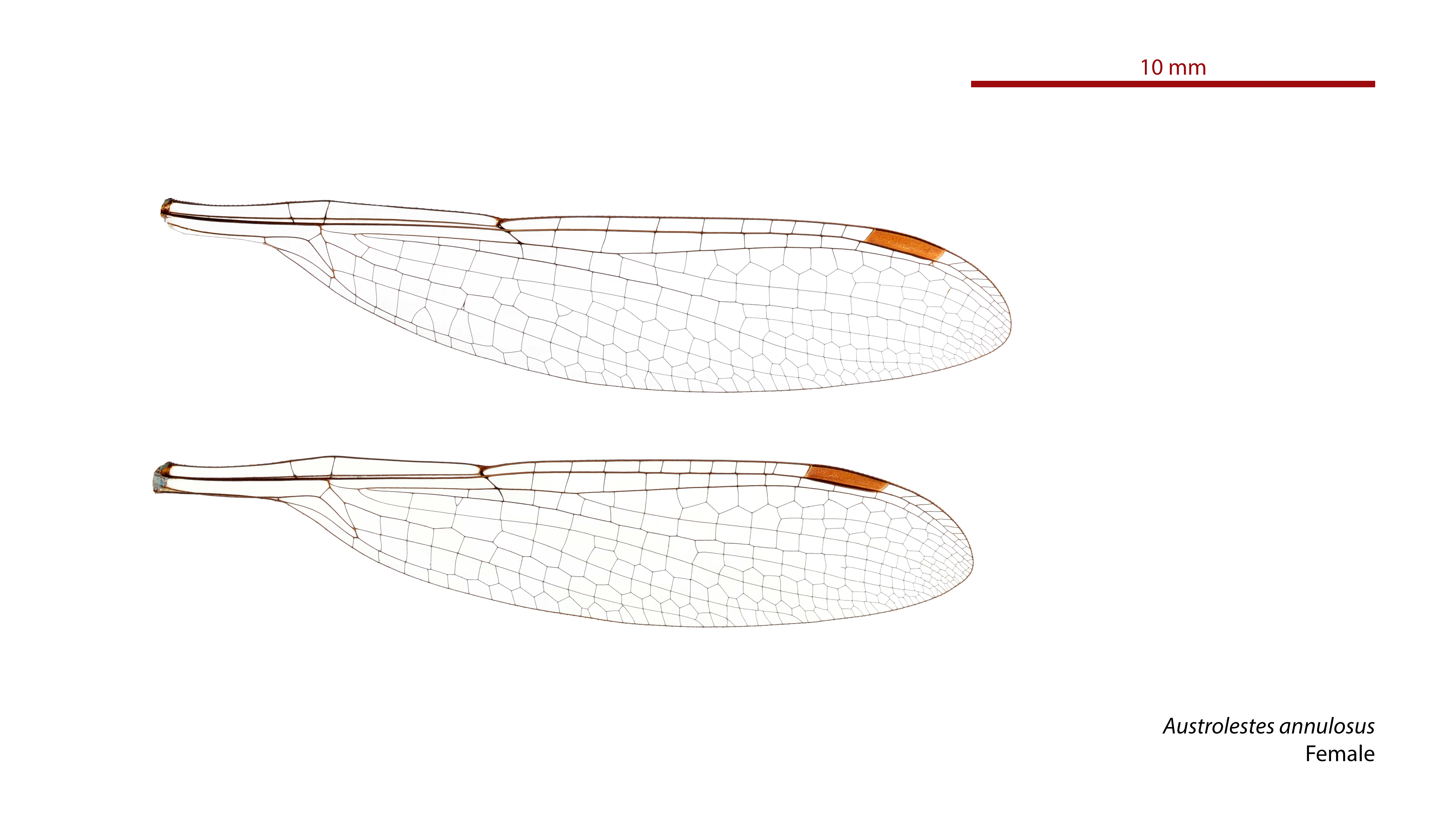
Female wings

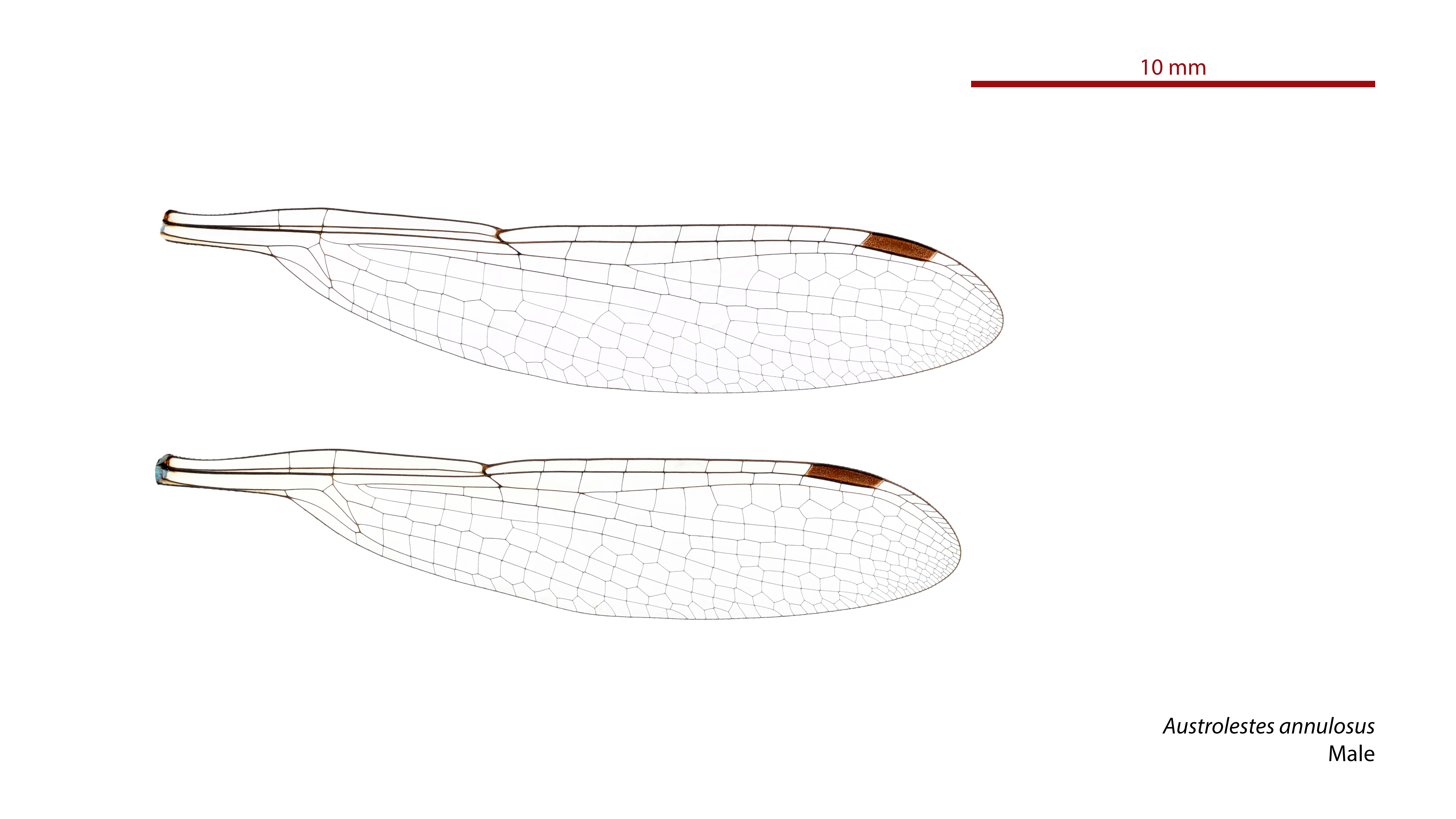
Male wings
