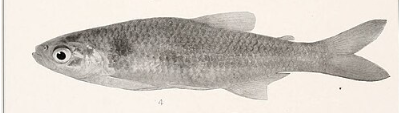

Conservation status
- Least Concern (IUCN 3.1)

Scientific classification
- Kingdom: Animalia
- Phylum: Chordata
- Class: Actinopterygii
- Order: Characiformes
- Family: Characidae
- Genus: Aphyocharax
- Species: A. erythrurus

Binomial name
- Aphyocharax erythrurus C. H. Eigenmann, 1912

= Flametail tetra =

Species of fish

The flametail tetra (Aphyocharax erythrurus) is a species of freshwater ray-finned fish belonging to the family Characidae. This fish is found in Guyana and Suriname in northern South America.

== Taxonomy ==
The flametail tetra was first formally described in 1912 by the American ichthyologist Carl H. Eigenmann, with its type locality given as the Rockstone sand-bank in Guyana. This species is classified in the genus Aphyocharax, which belongs to the subfamily Aphyocharacinae, the glass characins, which is part of the family Characidae within the suborder Characoidei of the order Characiformes.

== Etymology ==
The flametail tetra is a species in the genus Aphyocharax. This name prefixes aphyo, derived from the Greek aphýē, which means "small fry", referring to the small size of the type species of the genus, A. pusillus, onto the genus name, Charax. Charax means the pointed stake of a palisade, an allusion to the densely set sharp teeth, and is commonly used as a root for characin genera. The specific name, erythrurus, combines erythrós, Greek for "red", with ourá, meaning "tail", a reference to the brick-red colour of the caudal fin in living specimens.

== Description ==
The flametail tetra has a maximum length of 5.8 cm (2.3 in). It has an elongate shaped body with 10 or 11 soft rays in the dorsal fin and 17 soft rays in the anal fin. The overall colour is pale yellow with an indistinct humeral spot and a brick-red, deeply forked caudal fin.

== Distribution and habitat ==
The flametail tetra is found in northern South America. It is found in the drainage system of the Essequibo River and also in the Maripicru Creek in the upper drainage of the Branco River in Guyana. It has also been reported from the Demerara River, as well as the Courantyne River on the border between Guyana and Suriname. Fishes in the genus Aphyocharax are typically very common in middle-sized to large rivers in stretches with sand bottoms and shallow water. This species has been reported from this type of habitat in the Corantyne River.
