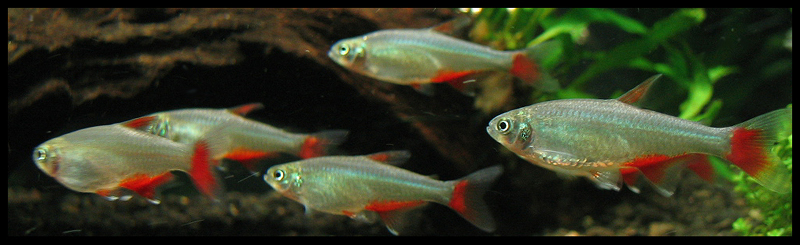
- Bloodfin tetras in a community tank

Conservation status
- Least Concern (IUCN 3.1)

Scientific classification
- Kingdom: Animalia
- Phylum: Chordata
- Class: Actinopterygii
- Order: Characiformes
- Family: Characidae
- Genus: Aphyocharax
- Species: A. anisitsi

Binomial name
- Aphyocharax anisitsi C. H. Eigenmann & C. H. Kennedy, 1903

Synonyms
- Phoxinopsis typicus Regan, 1907; Aphyocharax rubropinnis Pappenheim, 1921; Aphyocharax ipacarayensis Ahl, 1924; Aphyocharax affinis Ahl, 1924

= Bloodfin tetra =

Species of fish

The bloodfin tetra (Aphyocharax anisitsi) is a species of freshwater ray-finned fish, a characin, belonging to the family Characidae. This fish is found in southern central South America.

== Taxonomy ==
The bloodfin tetra was first formally described in 1903 by the American ichthyologists Carl H. Eigenmann and Clarence Hamilton Kennedy, with its type locality given as Asuncion, Paraguay. This species is classified in the genus Aphyocharax, which belongs to the subfamily Aphyocharacinae, the glass characins, which is part of the family Characidae within the suborder Characoidei of the order Characiformes.

== Etymology ==
The bloodfin tetra is a species in the genus Aphyocharax. This name prefixes aphyo, derived from the Greek aphýē, which means "small fry", referring to the small size of the type species of the genus, A. pusillus, onto the genus name Charax. Charax means the pointed stake of a palisade, an allusion to the densely set sharp teeth, and is commonly used as a root for characin genera. The specific name honours the Hungarian-born Paraguayan botanist and collector Juan Daniel Anisits of the Universidad Nacional de Asunción, who gave Indiana University a "well-preserved" collection of fishes, including the holotype of this species.

== Description ==
The bloodfin tetra has a small mouth with between 2 and 4 teeth on the maxilla. It has 33-34 scales in the lateral line, with 8 or 9 of these being perforated, with another isolated perforated pore on the caudal peduncle. The anal fin has 18 to 21 rays, with the first few rays forming a small lobe. The teeth are conical or tricuspid, and each premaxilla has a single series of 8 teeth. The overall colour is silver, with the bases of the pelvic and anal fins being red. In adult males there are small bony hooks on some of the rays in the anal and pelvic fins, and they have gill glands.

== Distribution and habitat ==
The bloodfin tetra is found in South America, in the basin of the Río de la Plata, where it occurs in the Paraguay, Uruguay and lower and middle Paraná River basins in Argentina, Brazil, Paraguay and Uruguay. It has been introduced to the Lagoa dos Patos and to the Upper Paraná in Brazil. It has been found in the wild in Florida, but the fishes have not persisted there, and in the Philippines. It is found in still and slow flowing waters, such as floodplain lakes.

== Biology ==
The bloodfin tetra prefers the upper layers of water, feeding on zooplankton and both aquatic and terrestrial insects. Depending on season, it will also feed on worms and crustaceans. They breed between September and February.

== Utilisation ==
The bloodfin tetra is used in the aquarium trade.

== See also ==
- List of freshwater aquarium fish species
