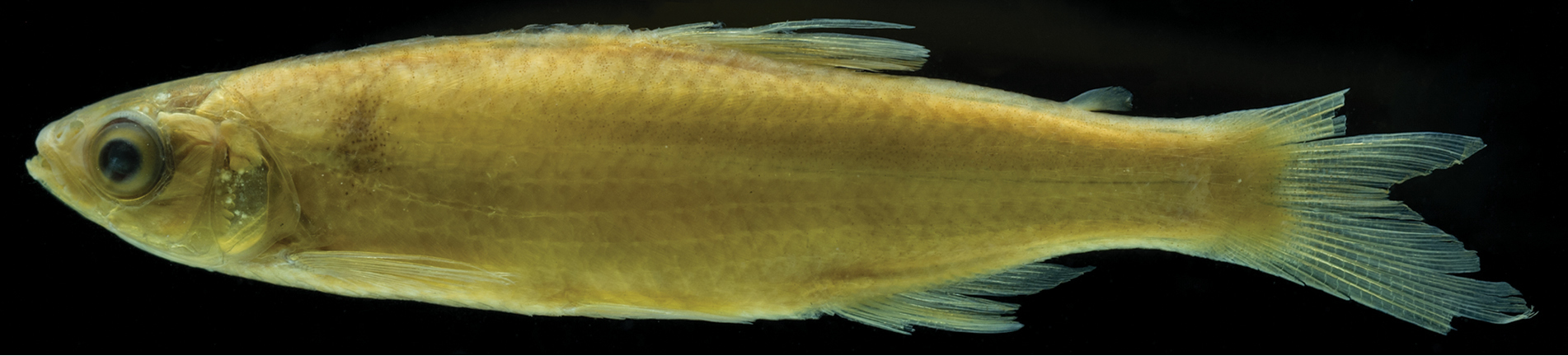

Conservation status
- Least Concern (IUCN 3.1)

Scientific classification
- Kingdom: Animalia
- Phylum: Chordata
- Class: Actinopterygii
- Order: Characiformes
- Family: Characidae
- Genus: Aphyocharax
- Species: A. avary

Binomial name
- Aphyocharax avary Fowler, 1913

= Aphyocharax avary =

Species of fish

Aphyocharax avary is a species of freshwater ray-finned fish, a characin, belonging to the family Characidae. This fish is endemic to Brazil.

== Taxonomy ==
Aphyocharax avary was first formally described in 1913 by the American ichthyologist Henry Weed Fowler from a holotype collected in September 1913 by Edgar A. Smith from the Madeira River, around 320 km (200 mi) east of 62°20'W. The type locality is situated between Novo Aripuanã and Borba in the lower Madeira River Basin. This species is classified in the genus Aphyocharax, and has been regarded as a synonym of A. alburnus, a taxon which is now regarded as a synonym of the type species of Aphyocharax, A. pusillus. The genus Aphyocharax belongs to the subfamily Aphyocharacinae, the glass characins, which is part of the family Characidae within the suborder Characoidei of the order Characiformes.

== Etymology ==
Aphyocharax avary is the type species of the genus Aphyocharax. This name prefixes aphyo, derived from the Greek aphýē, which means "small fry" , referring to the small size of A. pusillus, onto the genus name Charax. Charax means the pointed stake of a palisade, an allusion to the densely set sharp teeth, and is commonly used as a root for characin genera. The specific name, avary, is a local name for this species.

== Description ==
Aphyocharax avary and A. pusillus have been regarded as synonyms, but a 2018 study found that A. avary was a valid species. They both differ from all other species within Aphyocharax by having dark brown or black rays in the middle of the caudal fin. A. pusillus can be distinguished from A. avary by the possession of a smaller number of teeth on the maxilla which are distributed along the proximal half of the bone, compared to a greater number of teeth which are spread along two thirds of the maxillary extension. In this species there is an indistinct humeral spot, a spot to the rear of the operculum, in larger specimens, absent in smaller individuals, whereas in A. avary this spot is typically distinct and clearly discernible.

== Distribution and habitat ==
Aphyocharax avary is only known from the basin of the Madeira River in Brazil, but the true distribution of this species is unclear due to the confusion between this species and A. pusillus. Fishes in the genus Aphyocharax are typically very common in middle-sized to large rivers in stretches with sandy bottoms and shallow water.
