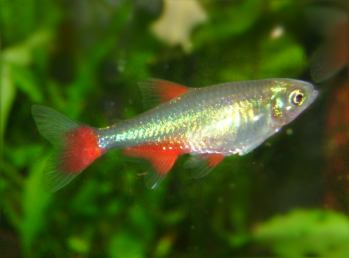
- Aphyocharax anisitsi

Scientific classification
- Kingdom: Animalia
- Phylum: Chordata
- Class: Actinopterygii
- Order: Characiformes
- Family: Characidae
- Subfamily: Aphyocharacinae
- Genus: Aphyocharax; Günther, 1868

Type species
- Aphyocharax pusillus Günther, 1868

Synonyms
- Holoprion C. H. Eigenmann, 1903; Phoxinopsis Regan, 1907; Notropocharax Marini, Nichols & La Monte, 1933

= Aphyocharax =

Genus of fishes

Aphyocharax is a genus of freshwater ray-finned fishes, characins, belonging to the family Characidae. The fishes in this genus are from South America, specifically the Amazon, Orinoco, Essequibo, Paraguay and Paraná basins.

== Species ==
Aphyocharax contains the following valid species:

- Aphyocharax agassizii (Steindachner, 1882)
- Aphyocharax anisitsi C. H. Eigenmann & C. H. Kennedy, 1903 (bloodfin tetra)
- Aphyocharax avary Fowler, 1913
- Aphyocharax brevicaudatus Brito, Guimarães, Carvalho-Costa & Ottoni, 2019
- Aphyocharax colifax Taphorn & Thomerson, 1991
- Aphyocharax dentatus C. H. Eigenmann & C. H. Kennedy, 1903
- Aphyocharax erythrurus C. H. Eigenmann, 1912 (flame tail tetra)
- Aphyocharax gracilis Fowler, 1940
- Aphyocharax nattereri (Steindachner, 1882) (dawn tetra)
- Aphyocharax pusillus Günther, 1868
- Aphyocharax rathbuni C. H. Eigenmann, 1907 (redflank bloodfin)
- Aphyocharax yekwanae Willink, Chernoff & Machado-Allison, 2003
