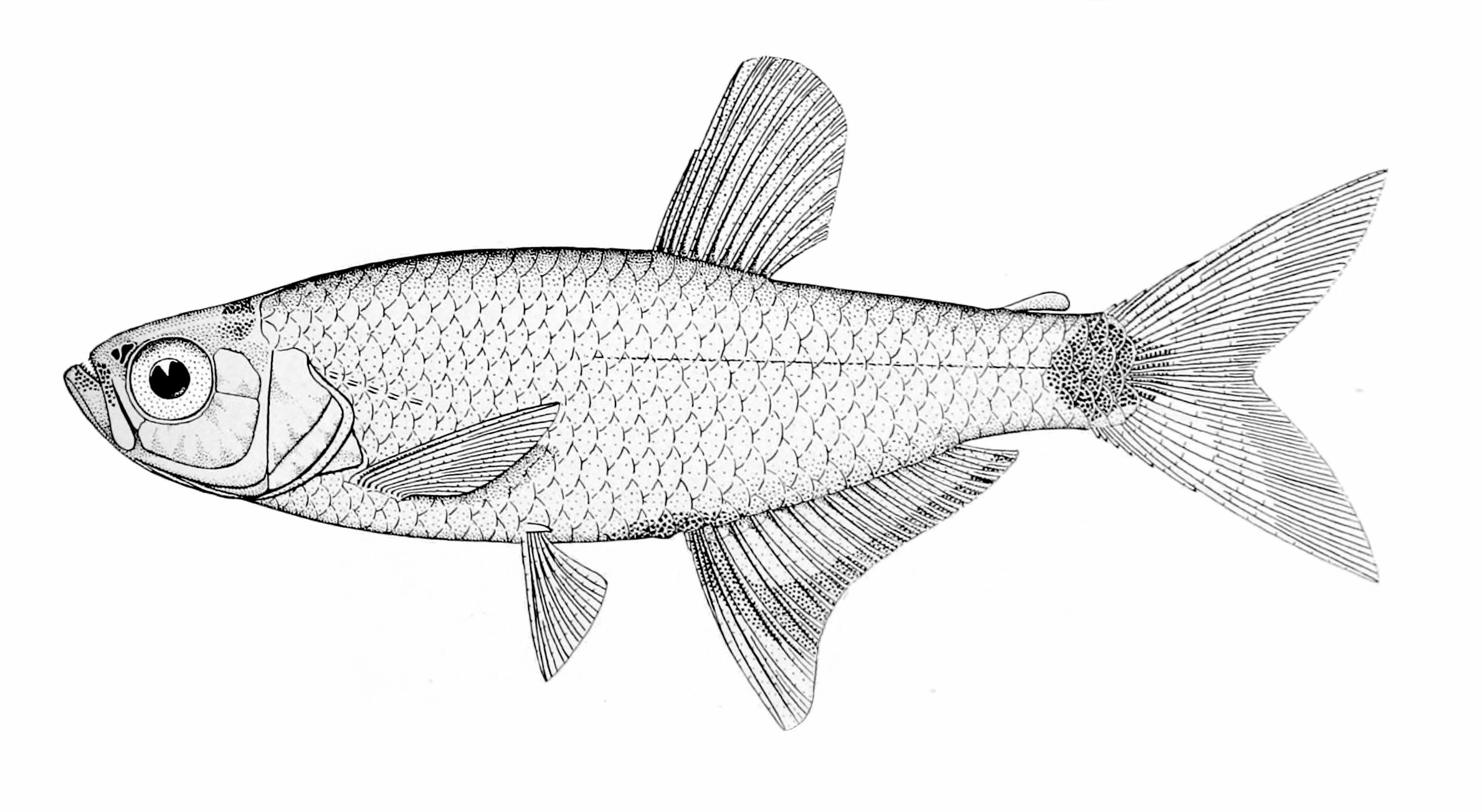

Conservation status
- Least Concern (IUCN 3.1)

Scientific classification
- Kingdom: Animalia
- Phylum: Chordata
- Class: Actinopterygii
- Order: Characiformes
- Family: Characidae
- Genus: Aphyocharax
- Species: A. nattereri

Binomial name
- Aphyocharax nattereri (Steindachner, 1882)

Synonyms
- Chirodon nattereri Steindachner, 1882; Prionobrama nattereri (Steindachner 1882) Chirodon pulcher; Steindachner, 1882 Cheirodon steindachneri; C. H. Eigenmann & R. S. Eigenmann, 1891 Aphyocharax paraguayensis; C. H. Eigenmann, 1915

= Dawn tetra =

Species of fish

The dawn tetra, panda tetra, or [Rio] Paraguay tetra (Aphyocharax nattereri) comes from the Rio Paraguay basin in Paraguay and Brazil.

It is a schooling fish. Suitable temperatures for the Paraguay tetra are 24 to 27 °C (75 to 81 °F). This species is omnivorous with a strong preference for animal food. It will eat normal aquarium fish food, but much prefers live food. The dawn tetra is an egg-scattering species. This tetra is very active and extremely aggressive towards fish of similar or smaller size or those that are slower moving. They are not suitable for a community tank.

Dawn tetras are a small fish species, typically reaching a size of 1.5 to 2 inches (38 to 51 mm). They are also sometimes referred to as "dwarf" tetras due to their small size.
