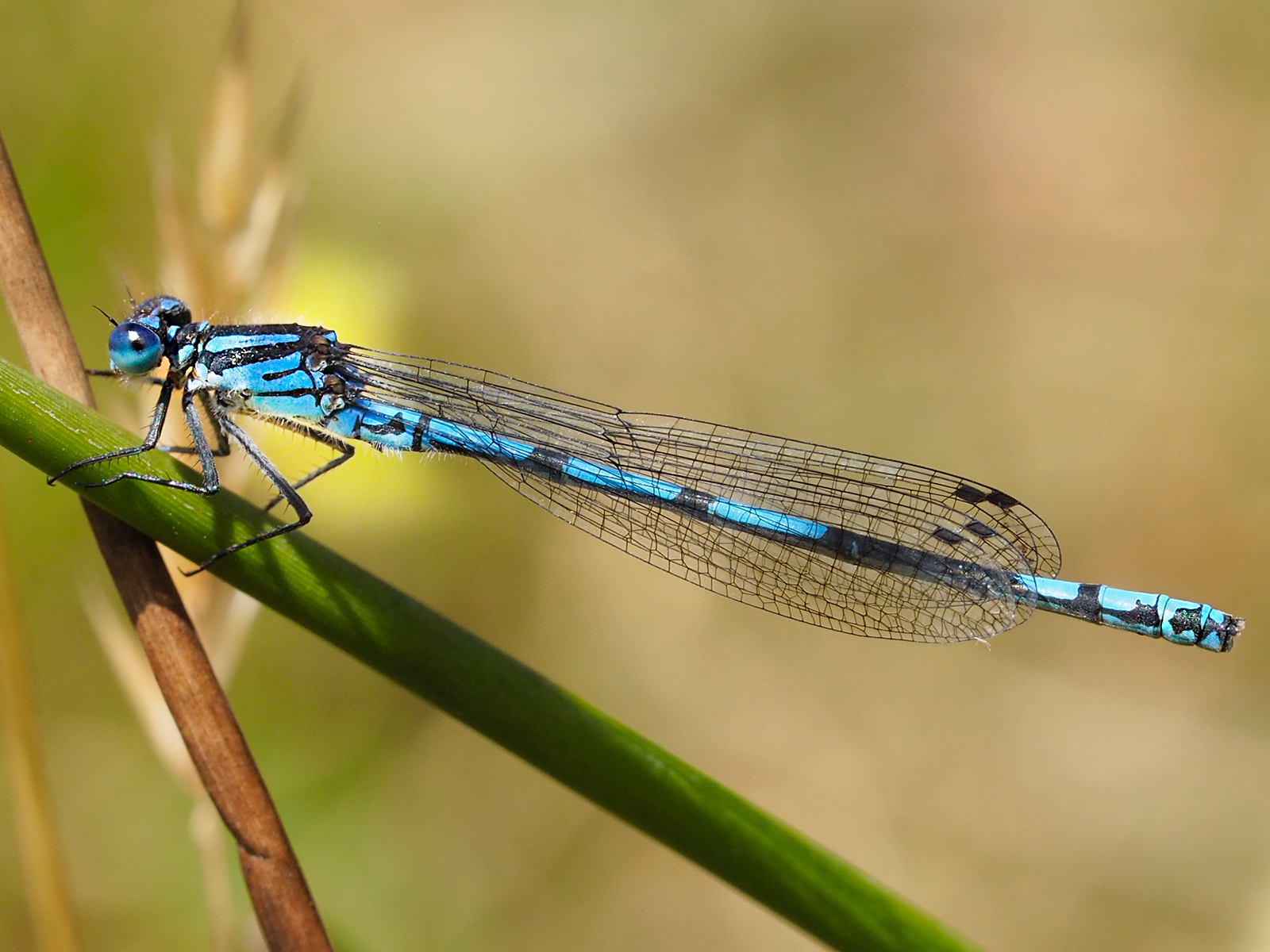
- Male

Conservation status
- Least Concern (IUCN 3.1)

Scientific classification
- Kingdom: Animalia
- Phylum: Arthropoda
- Clade: Pancrustacea
- Class: Insecta
- Order: Odonata
- Suborder: Zygoptera
- Family: Coenagrionidae
- Genus: Austrocoenagrion; Kennedy, 1920
- Species: A. lyelli

Binomial name
- Austrocoenagrion lyelli (Tillyard, 1913)

Synonyms
- Agrion lyelli Tillyard, 1913; Agrion brisbanense Tillyard, 1917

= Austrocoenagrion =

Swamp bluet

Genus of damselfly

Austrocoenagrion is a monotypic genus of damselflies belonging to the family Coenagrionidae. The single species of this genus, Austrocoenagrion lyelli, is commonly known as a swamp bluet.

Austrocoenagrion lyelli is a medium-sized damselfly, the male is bright blue with black markings. It is found in south-eastern Australia, where it inhabits streams, pools and lakes.

== Taxonomy ==
The species, Austrocoenagrion lyelli, was originally described as Agrion lyelli by Robin Tillyard in 1913. It was later transferred to the genus Coenagrion, where it was known as Coenagrion lyelli..

Agrion brisbanense, from Brisbane, described by Tillyard in 1917, was subsequently found to represent the same species. It is now treated as a synonym.

The species is currently placed in the genus Austrocoenagrion.

== Etymology ==
The genus name Austrocoenagrion combines the prefix austro- (from Latin auster, meaning “south wind”, hence “southern”) with Coenagrion, the name of a related genus. It refers to a southern representative of that group.

In 1913, Robin Tillyard named this species lyelli, an eponym honouring his friend, the naturalist George Lyell (1866-1951).

== Gallery ==
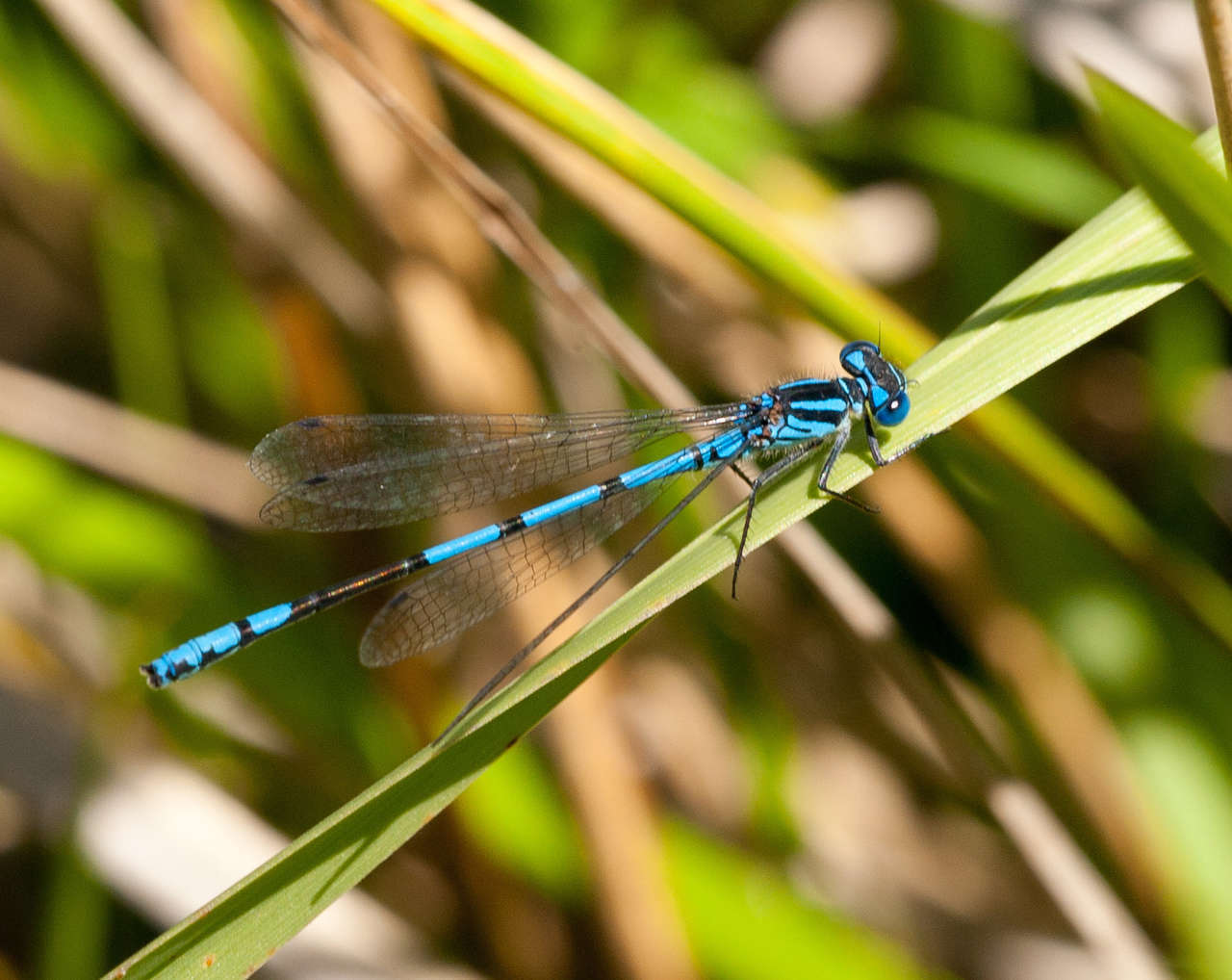
Male

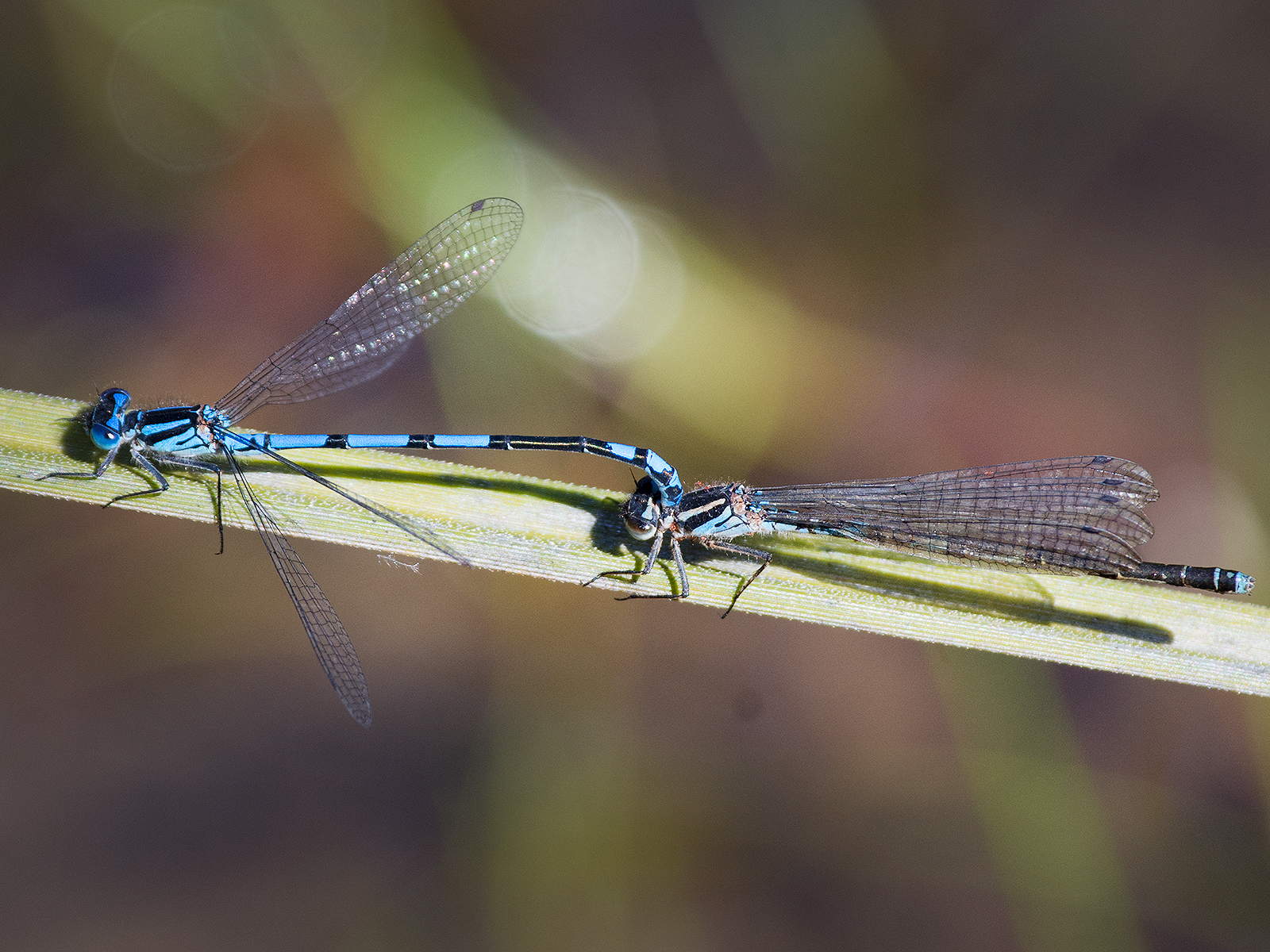
Mating pair, male in front holding the female with the tip of his tail

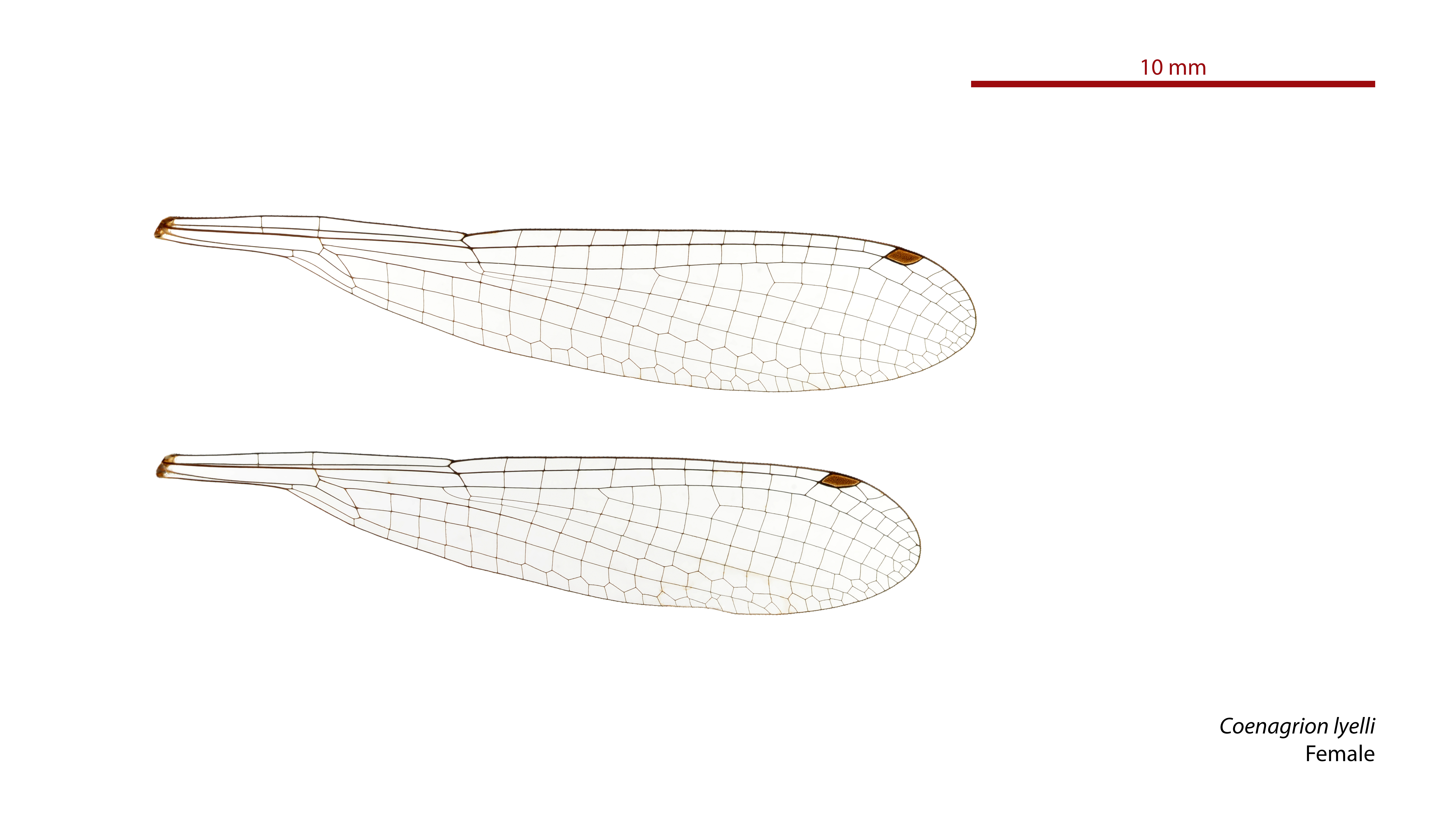
Female wings

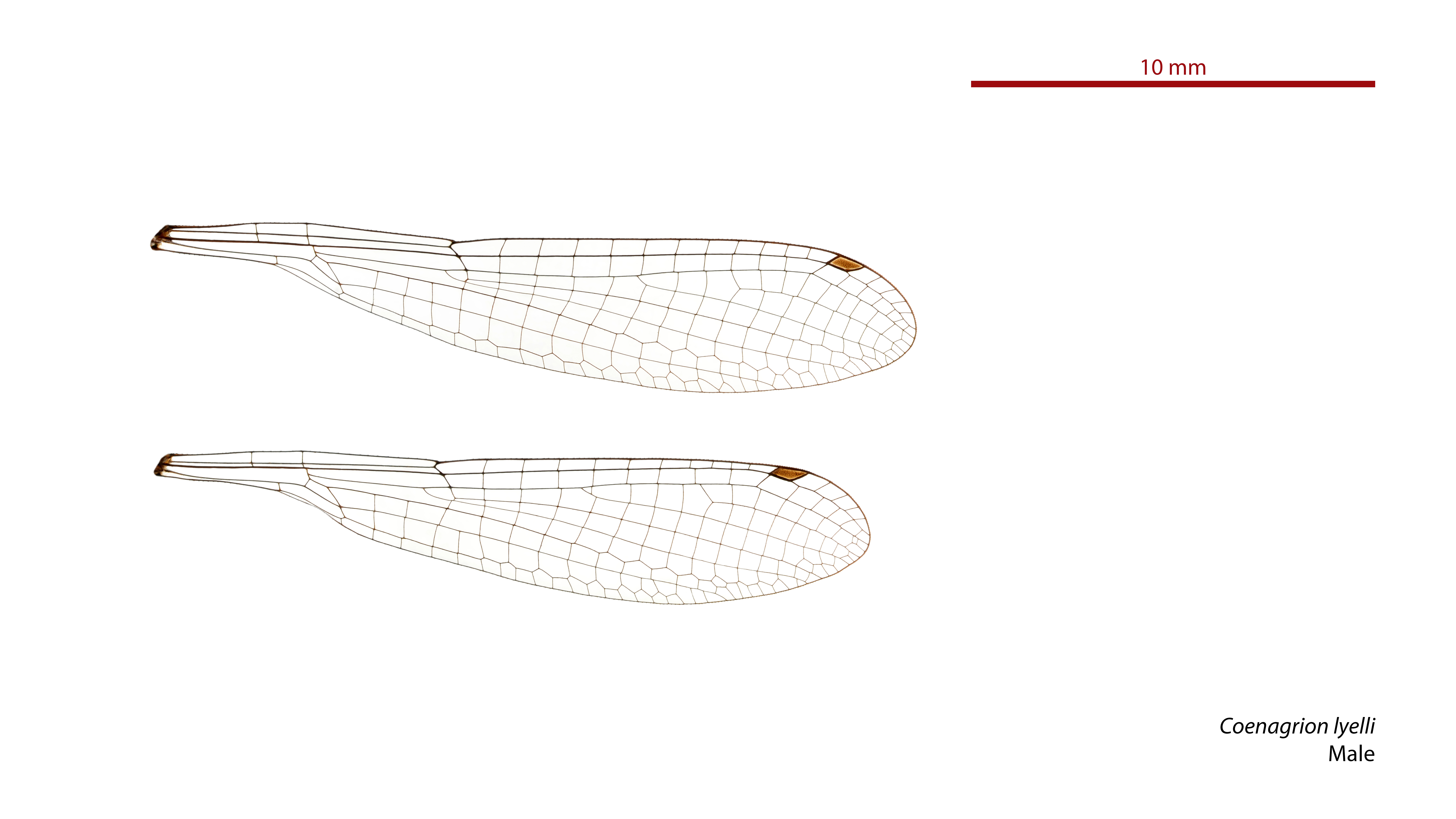
Male wings

== See also ==
- List of Odonata species of Australia
