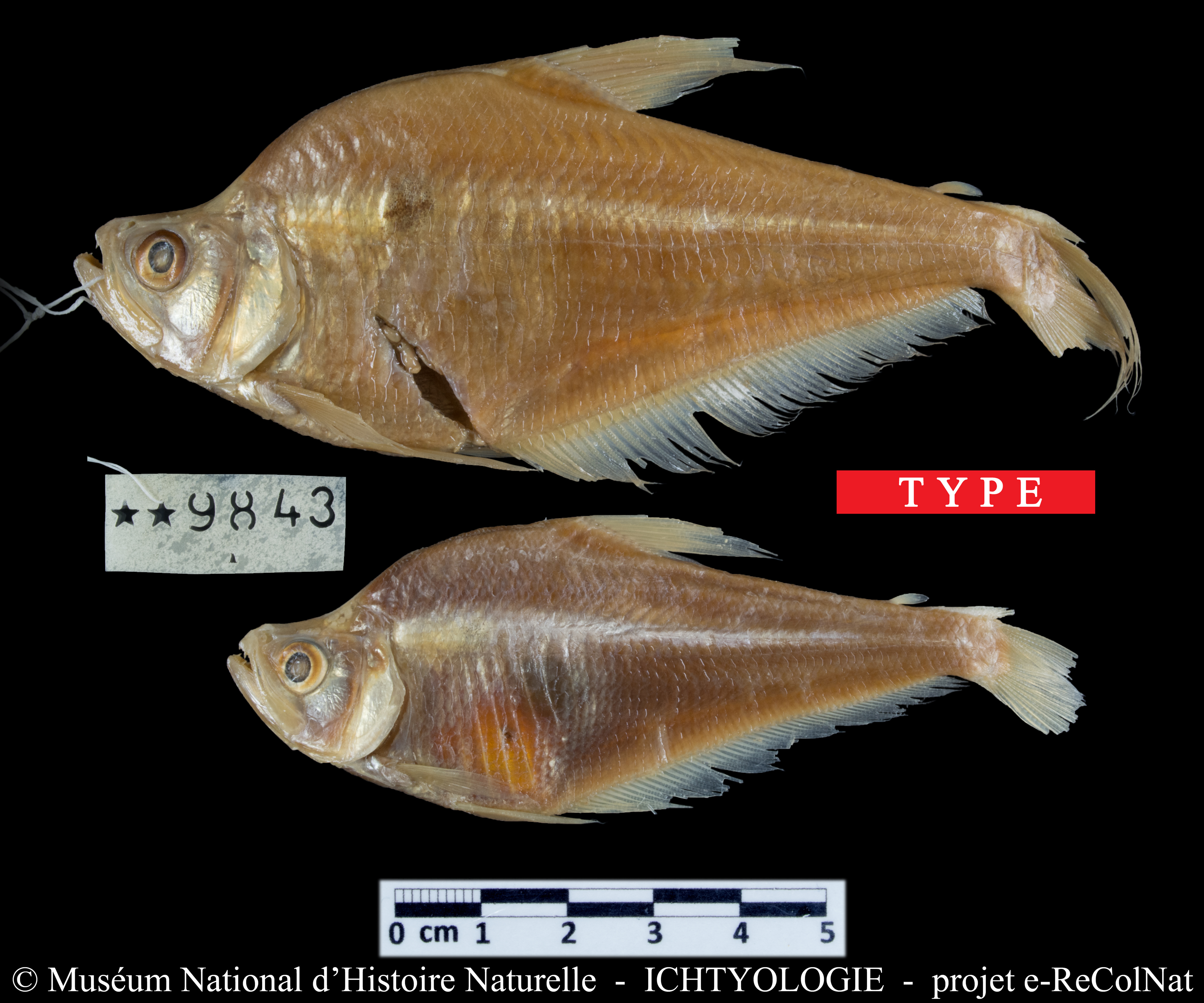

Conservation status
- Least Concern (IUCN 3.1)

Scientific classification
- Kingdom: Animalia
- Phylum: Chordata
- Class: Actinopterygii
- Division: Teleostei
- Order: Characiformes
- Family: Characidae
- Genus: Charax
- Species: C. gibbosus

Binomial name
- Charax gibbosus (Linnaeus, 1758)

Synonyms
- Salmo gibbosus Linnaeus, 1758; Cynopotamus gibbosus Valenciennes, 1850

= Glass headstander =

Species of fish

The glass headstander (Charax gibbosus) is a species of freshwater ray-finned fish, a characin, belonging to the family Characidae. This fish is found in South America.

== Taxonomy ==
The glass headstander was first formally described in the 10th edition of Systema Naturae published in 1758 by Carl Linnaeus, with its type locality given as Suriname. In 1777 Scopoli proposed the new genus Charax, although he did not place any species within it. Salmo gibbosus was designated as the type species of Charax by Carl H. Eigenmann in 1910. The genus Charax is the type genus of the subfamily Characinae of the family Characidae. This family is classified within the suborder Characoidei of the order Characiformes.

== Etymology ==
The glass headstander is the type species of the genus Charax. This name was first used as a non-binomial name in 1764 by Gronow for this species and is based on the Greek chárax, meaning a pointed stake in a palisade, an allusion to the densely packed sharp teeth of this species. The specific name, gibbosus, means "crooked" or "humpback", a reference to the protruding nape.

== Description ==
The glass headstander has a maximum total length of 14.4 cm (5.7 in) and a maximum weight of 30.4 g (1.07 oz).

== Distribution and habitat ==
The glass headstander is found in South America in rivers in Guyana and Suriname, and in the upper Branco River in Brazil. This species occurs in tributaries.

== Diet ==
The glass headstander feeds on other fishes, insects, crustaceans, bivalves and some plant matter.

== Conservation status ==
The glass headstander has been assessed as Least Concern by the International Union for Conservation of Nature because it is relatively common across a rather wide range. However, some subpopulations may be adversely affected by mining activities.
