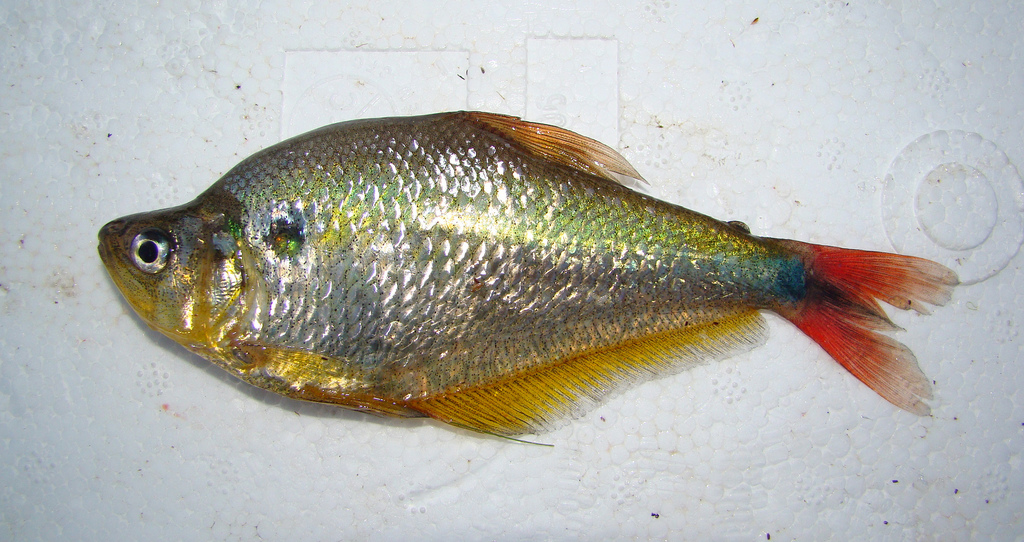

Conservation status
- Least Concern (IUCN 3.1)

Scientific classification
- Kingdom: Animalia
- Phylum: Chordata
- Class: Actinopterygii
- Order: Characiformes
- Family: Characidae
- Genus: Charax
- Species: C. stenopterus

Binomial name
- Charax stenopterus (Cope, 1894)

Synonyms
- Asiphonichthys stenopterus Cope, 1894

= Charax stenopterus =

Species of fish

Charax stenopterus is species of freshwater ray-finned fish, a characin, belonging to the family Characidae. This species is found in South America where it occurs in the Uruguay and Paraná Rivers and some coastal drainages in southern Brazil, Argentina, Paraguay and Uruguay. It is found in streams with slow flows, canals, lagoons and reservoirs with dense aquatic vegetation. Its diet is mainly composed of insects. This species reaches a maximum standard length of 9.4 cm (3.7 in).
