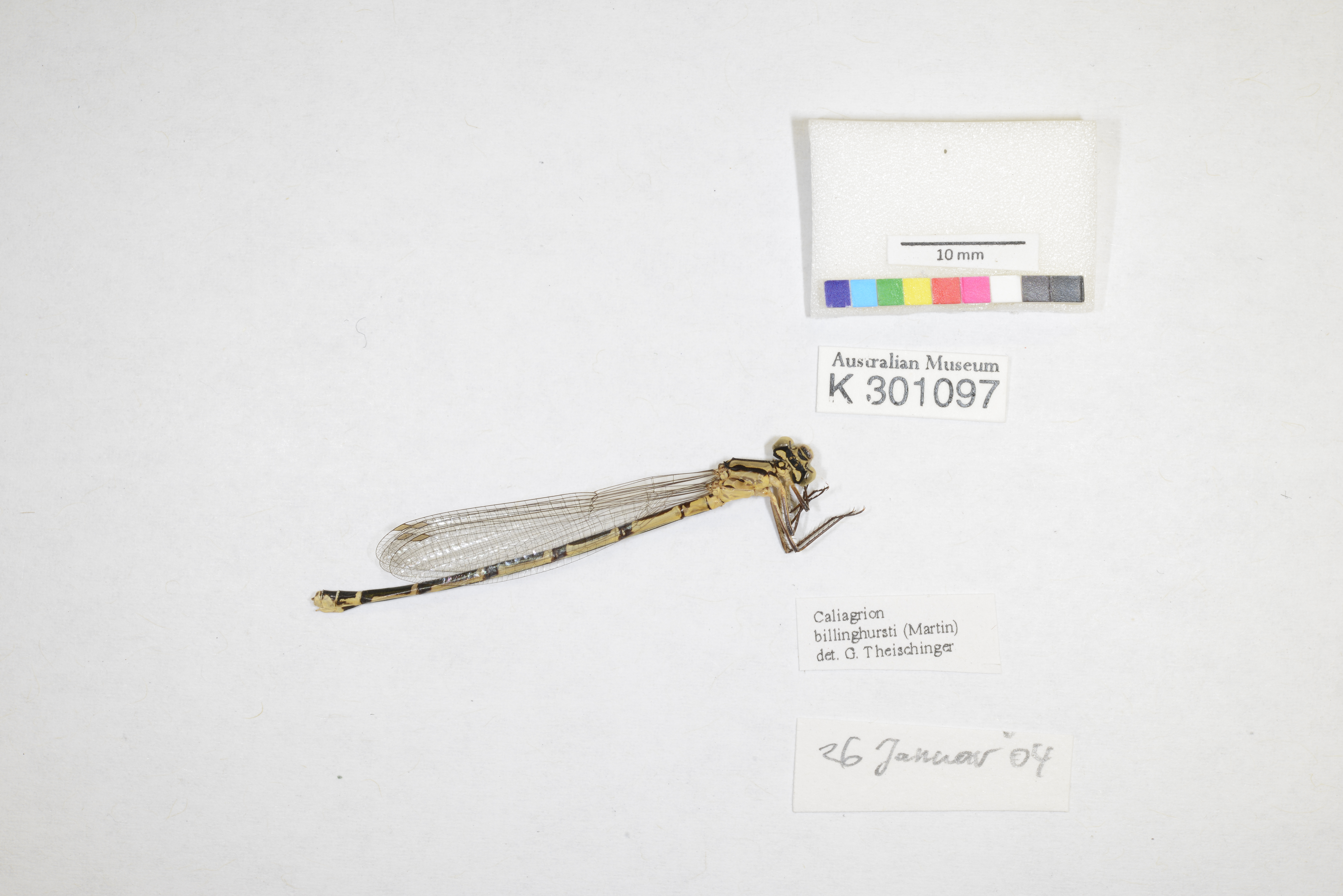
- Caliagrion billinghursti

Conservation status
- Vulnerable (IUCN 3.1)

Scientific classification
- Kingdom: Animalia
- Phylum: Arthropoda
- Clade: Pancrustacea
- Class: Insecta
- Order: Odonata
- Suborder: Zygoptera
- Family: Coenagrionidae
- Genus: Caliagrion; Tillyard, 1913
- Species: C. billinghursti

Binomial name
- Caliagrion billinghursti (Martin, 1901)

Synonyms
- Pseudagrion billinghursti Martin, 1901

= Caliagrion =

Large riverdamsel

Genus of damselflies

Caliagrion is a monotypic genus of damselflies belonging to the family Coenagrionidae. The single species of this genus, Caliagrion billinghursti, is commonly known as a large riverdamsel, and is endemic to south-eastern Australia, where it inhabits slow-flowing rivers and ponds.

Caliagrion billinghursti is a large damselfly; the male is coloured bright blue with black, while the female is yellow and black.

== Etymology ==
The genus name Caliagrion is derived from the Greek καλός (kalos, "beautiful" or "good") combined with Agrion, a genus name derived from the Greek ἄγριος (agrios, "wild").

In 1901, René Martin named the species billinghursti, an eponym honouring its collector, Farncombe Lovett Billinghurst (1859-1937), of Alexandra, Victoria.

== Gallery ==
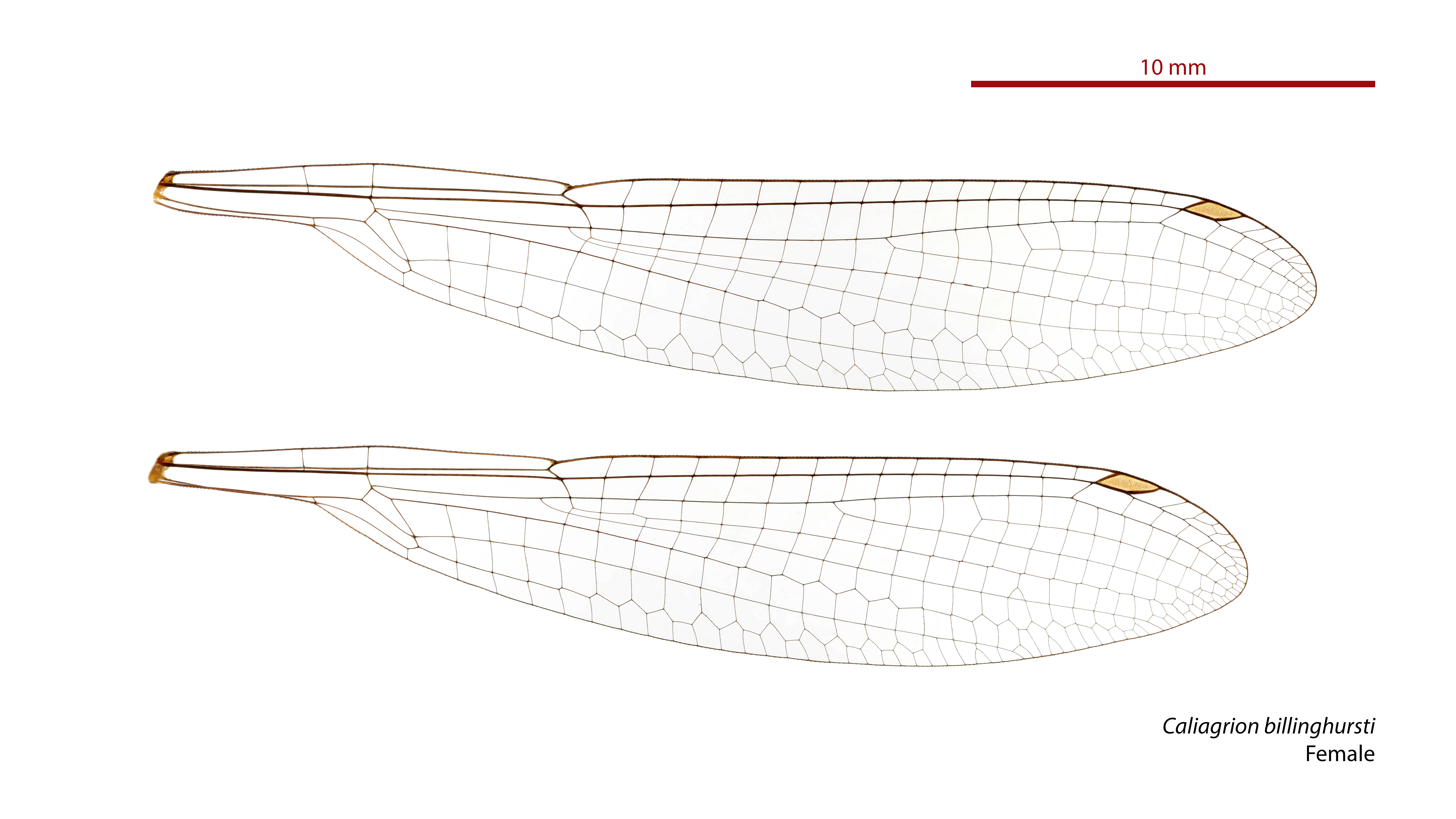
Female Caliagrion billinghursti wings

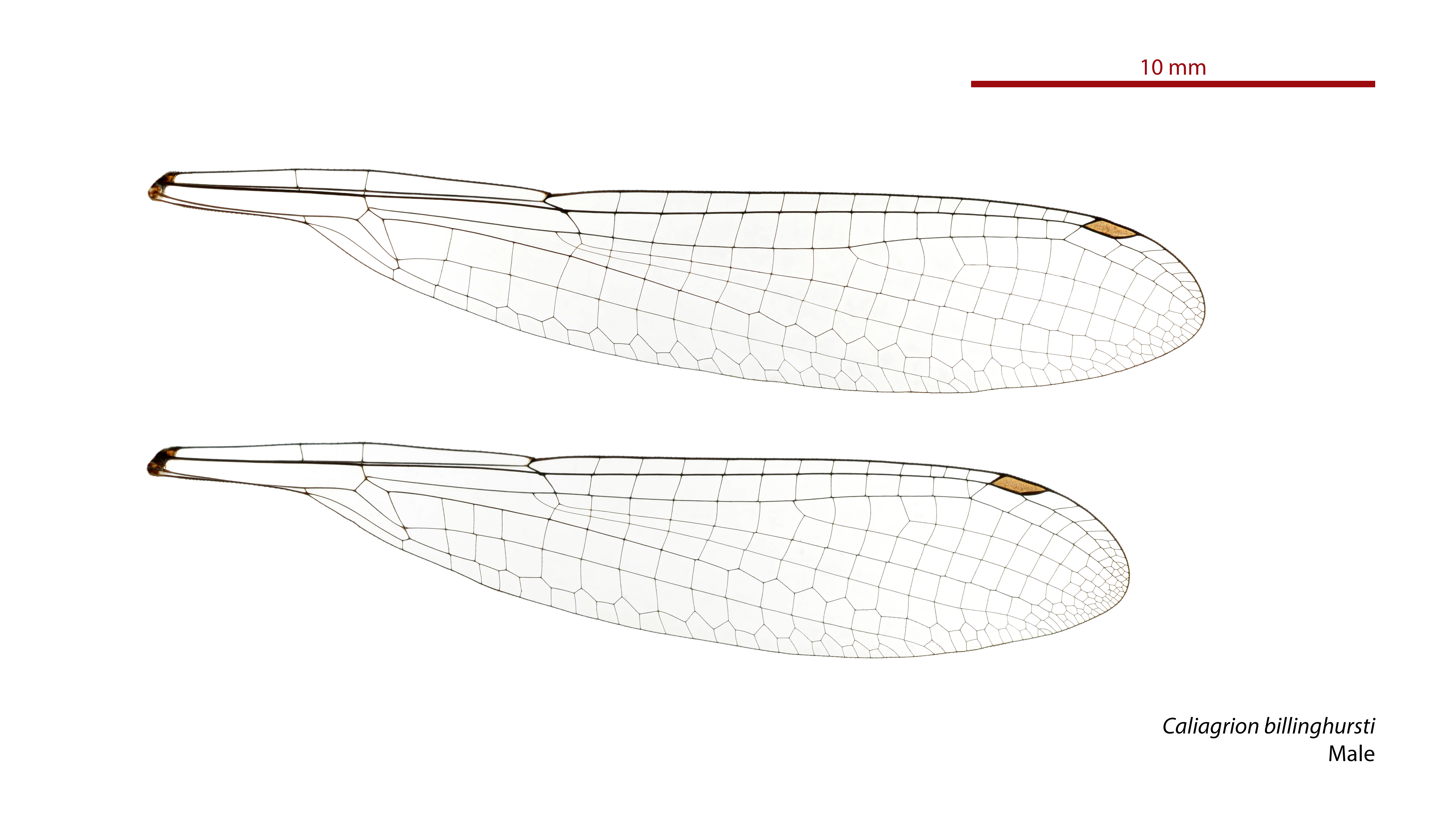
Male Caliagrion billinghursti wings
