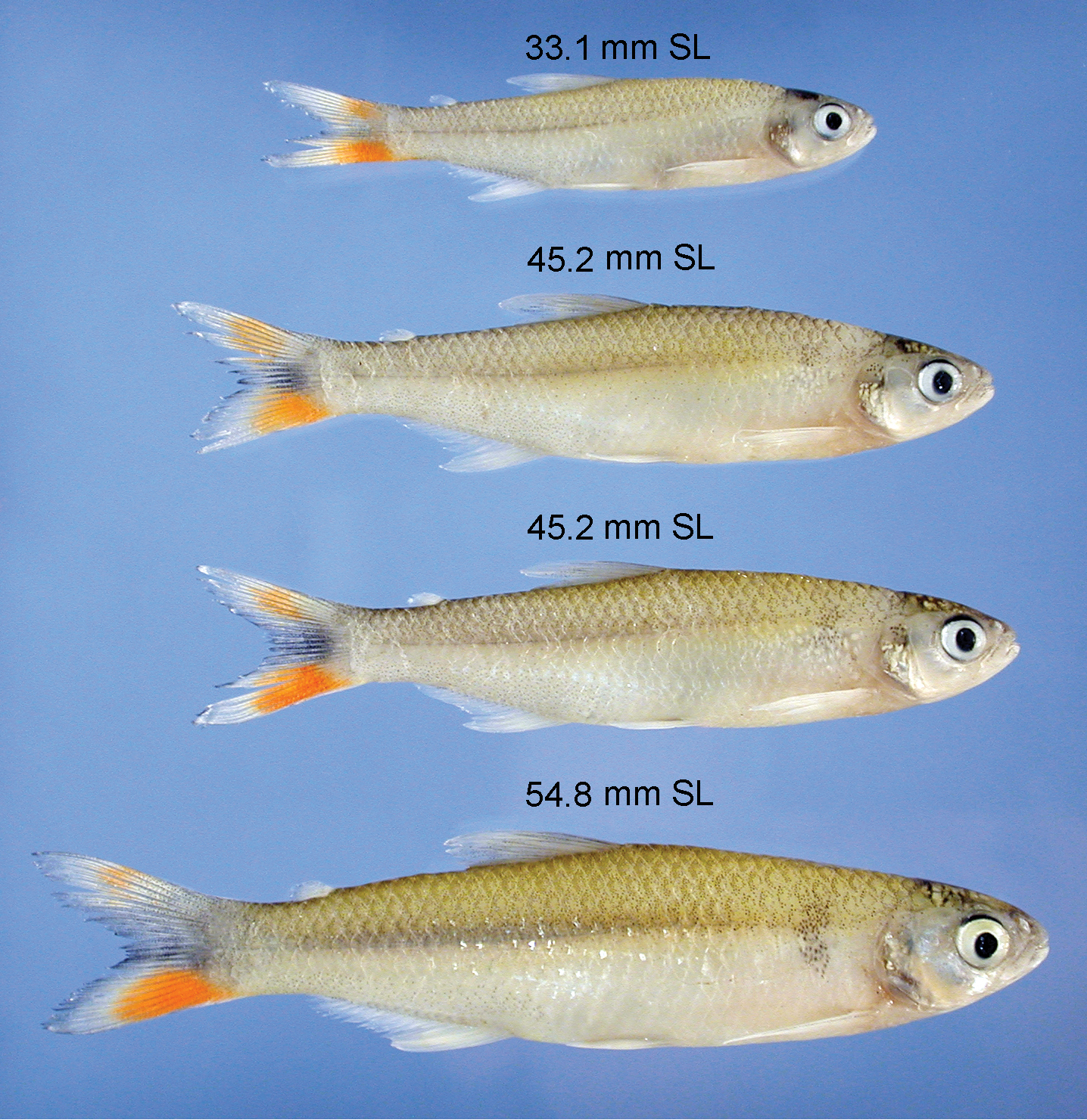

Conservation status
- Least Concern (IUCN 3.1)

Scientific classification
- Kingdom: Animalia
- Phylum: Chordata
- Class: Actinopterygii
- Order: Characiformes
- Family: Characidae
- Genus: Aphyocharax
- Species: A. pusillus

Binomial name
- Aphyocharax pusillus Günther, 1868

Synonyms
- Chirodon alburnus Günther, 1869; Aphyocharax alburnus (Günther, 1869)

= Aphyocharax pusillus =

Species of fish

Aphyocharax pusillus is a species of freshwater ray-finned fish, a characin, belonging to the family Characidae. This fish is found in the Amazon basin of South America.

== Taxonomy ==
Aphyocharax pusillus was first formally described in 1868 by the German-born British herpetologist and ichthyologist Albert Günther from two syntypes collected by Edward Bartlett in Xeberos and Huallaga in the Peruvian part of the Amazon Basin. When Günther described this species, he placed it in a new monospecific genus, Aphyocharax, meaning that A. pusillus is the type species of that genus by monotypy. This genus belongs to the subfamily Aphyocharacinae, the glass characins, which is part of the family Characidae within the suborder Characoidei of the order Characiformes.

== Etymology ==
Aphyocharax pusillus is the type species of the genus Aphyocharax. This name prefixes aphyo, derived from the Greek aphýē, which means "small fry" , referring to the small size of A. pusillus, onto the genus name Charax. Charax means the pointed stake of a palisade, an allusion to the densely set sharp teeth, and is commonly used as a root for characin genera. The specific name, pusillus, means "very small", an allusion to the small size of this species.

== Description ==
Aphyocharax pusillus has a maximum standard length of 6.4 cm (2.5 in). This species and A. avary have been regarded as synonyms but a 2018 study found that A. avary was a valid species. They both differ from all other species within Aphyocharax by having dark brown or black rays in the middle of the caudal fin. It can be distinguished from A. avary by the possession of a smaller number of teeth on the maxilla which are distributed along the proximal half of the bone, compared to a greater number of teeth which are spread along two thirds of the maxillary extension. In this species there is an indistinct humeral spot, a spot to the rear of the operculum, in larger specimens, absent in smaller individuals, whereas in A. avary this spot is typically distinct and clearly discernible.

== Distribution and habitat ==
Aphyocharax pusillus is found in the Amazon basin of Peru, Ecuador, Colombia, Bolivia and Brazil, but the true distribution of this species is unclear due to the confusion between this species and A. avary. Fishes in the genus Aphyocharax are typically very common in middle-sized to large rivers in stretches with sand bottoms and shallow water. This species was recorded in Bolivia in a white water stream which drained from a floodplain lake in Peru. This stream has shores and beds that are sandy/muddy and with a large amount of submerged logs and leaves, a fast current, no aquatic vegetation and gallery forest along parts of its banks.

== Utilisation ==
Aphyocharax pusillus has been found in the aquarium trade, but trade of this species is at a low level.
