= Clarence Hamilton Kennedy =

American entomologist and ichthyologist

- Born: June 25, 1879; Rockport, Indiana, United States
- Died: June 6, 1952
- Education: Indiana University Bloomington (B.A., M.A.); Stanford University (M.A.); Cornell University (Ph.D.)
- Known for: Described several taxa of fish and insects
- Awards: Honorary doctorate, Indiana University (1950)
- Scientific career
- Fields: Entomology, Ichthyology
- Workplaces: United States Bureau of Fisheries

Clarence Hamilton Kennedy (June 25, 1879 – June 6, 1952) was an American entomologist and ichthyologist. He described among others Aphyocharax anisitsi, Celaenura gemina, Hypostomus boulengeri, and Ischnura gemina.

== Biography ==
Kennedy was born in Rockport, Indiana. In 1902, he received his bachelor's degree, and in 1903 he earned a master's degree from Indiana University Bloomington. After graduating, he worked at the United States Bureau of Fisheries in Washington, D.C.

In 1915, Kennedy obtained another master's degree at Stanford University, and in 1919 he completed his Ph.D. dissertation at Cornell University. He worked at several American universities, building an academic career and eventually becoming a professor. He served on an editorial board publishing monographs on the ecology of South America. In 1950, Indiana University awarded him an honorary doctorate.

Kennedy married in March 1927 and had a son and a daughter.
