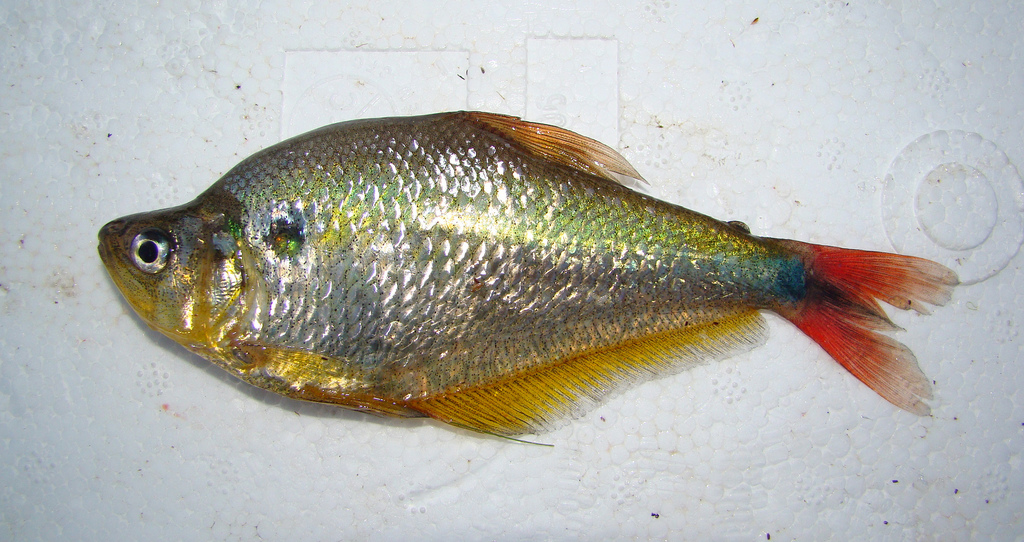
- Charax stenopterus

Scientific classification
- Kingdom: Animalia
- Phylum: Chordata
- Class: Actinopterygii
- Order: Characiformes
- Family: Characidae
- Subfamily: Characinae
- Genus: Charax; Scopoli, 1777

Type species
- Salmo gibbosus Linnaeus, 1758

Species
- See text

Synonyms
- Characinus Lacépède, 1803; Charax Risso, 1827; Epicyrtus Müller & Troschel, 1844; Anacyrtus Günther, 1864; Asiphonichthys Cope, 1894; Moralesia Fowler, 1943; Charaxodon Fernández-Yépez, 1947; Moralesicus Fowler, 1958

= Charax (fish) =

Genus of fishes

Charax is a genus of freshwater ray-finned fishes, characins, belonging to the family Characidae. These fish, among other characteristics, are small and have a rhomboid shape. Some species are semi-translucent. These fishes are found in South America.

== Species ==
Charax contains the following valid species:

- Charax apurensis Lucena, 1987
- Charax awa Guimarães, Brito, Ferreira & Ottoni, 2018
- Charax caudimaculatus Lucena, 1987
- Charax condei (Géry & Knöppel, 1976)
- Charax delimai Menezes & Lucena, 2014
- Charax gibbosus (Linnaeus, 1758)
- Charax hemigrammus (C. H. Eigenmann, 1912)
- Charax leticiae Lucena, 1987
- Charax macrolepis (Kner, 1858)
- Charax metae C. H. Eigenmann, 1922
- Charax michaeli Lucena, 1989
- Charax niger Lucena, 1989
- Charax notulatus Lucena, 1987
- Charax pauciradiatus (Günther, 1864)
- Charax rupununi C. H. Eigenmann, 1912
- Charax stenopterus (Cope, 1894)
- Charax tectifer (Cope, 1870)
