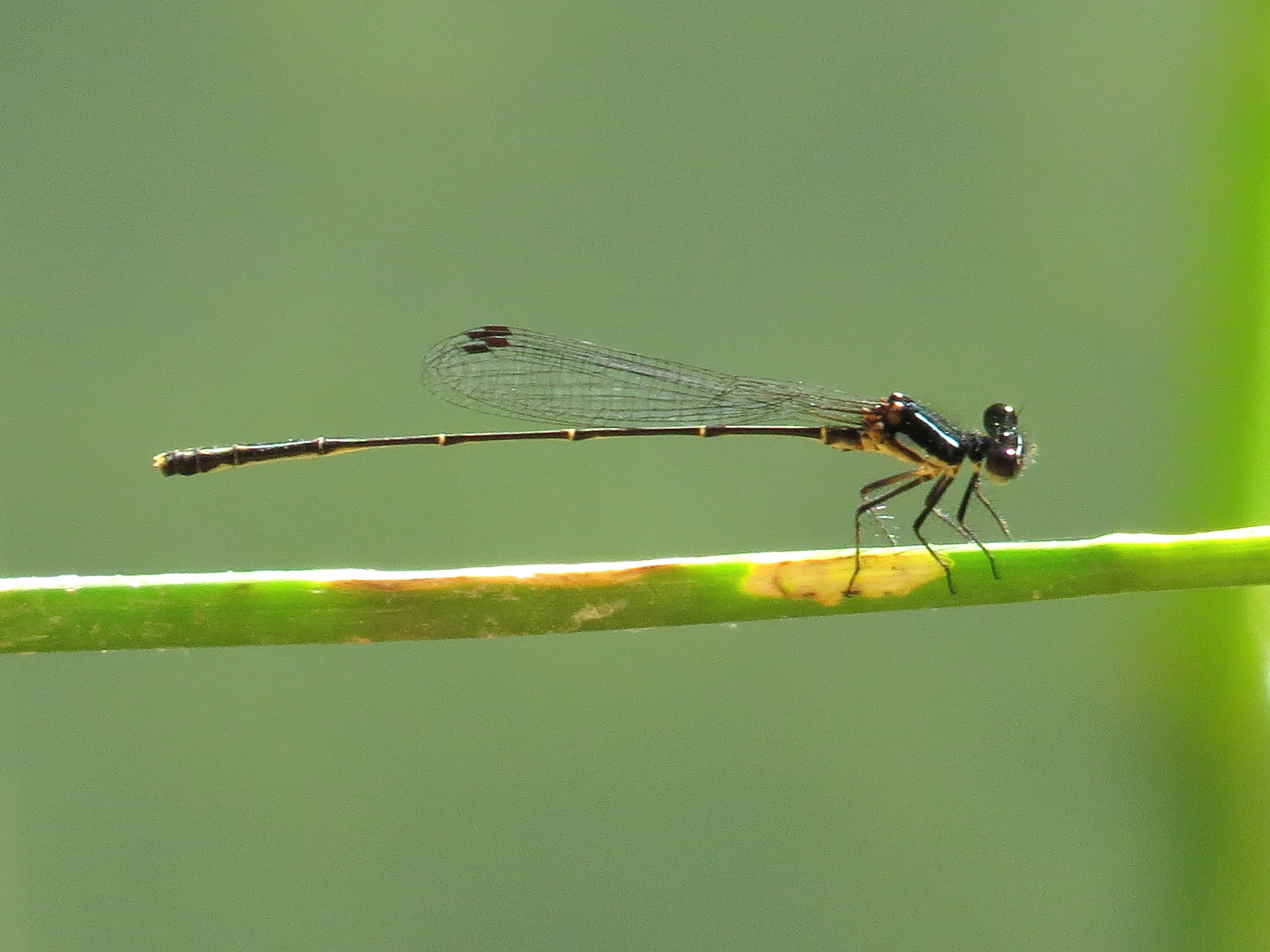
- Northern threadtail (male)

Conservation status
- Least Concern (IUCN 3.1)

Scientific classification
- Kingdom: Animalia
- Phylum: Arthropoda
- Clade: Pancrustacea
- Class: Insecta
- Order: Odonata
- Suborder: Zygoptera
- Family: Platycnemididae
- Genus: Nososticta
- Species: N. fraterna

Binomial name
- Nososticta fraterna (Lieftinck, 1933)

Synonyms
- Notoneura fraterna Lieftinck, 1933

= Nososticta fraterna =

Northern threadtail

Species of damselfly

Nososticta fraterna is an Australian species of damselfly in the family Platycnemididae, commonly known as the northern threadtail.

Its usual habitat is near rivers, riverine lagoons and streams. The adult is a small to medium-sized damselfly with a wingspan of 25 to 35mm. The adult is dark with pale stripes on the synthorax. The wings are tinted with lemon-yellow in the male, and generally hyaline in the female. In Australia, the distribution is in suitable habitat in the north and eastern part of the continent from the top end of the Northern Territory to the northern half of Queensland. The taxon has not been assessed in the IUCN Red List, but it is listed in the Catalogue of Life.

== Etymology ==
The genus name Nososticta combines the Greek νόσος (nosos, "disease") with στικτός (stiktos, "spotted" or "marked"). The suffix -sticta is commonly used in names of taxa related to Protoneura and the subfamily Isostictinae.

The species name fraterna is Latin for "brotherly", referring to its similarity to Notoneura solitaria.

== Gallery ==
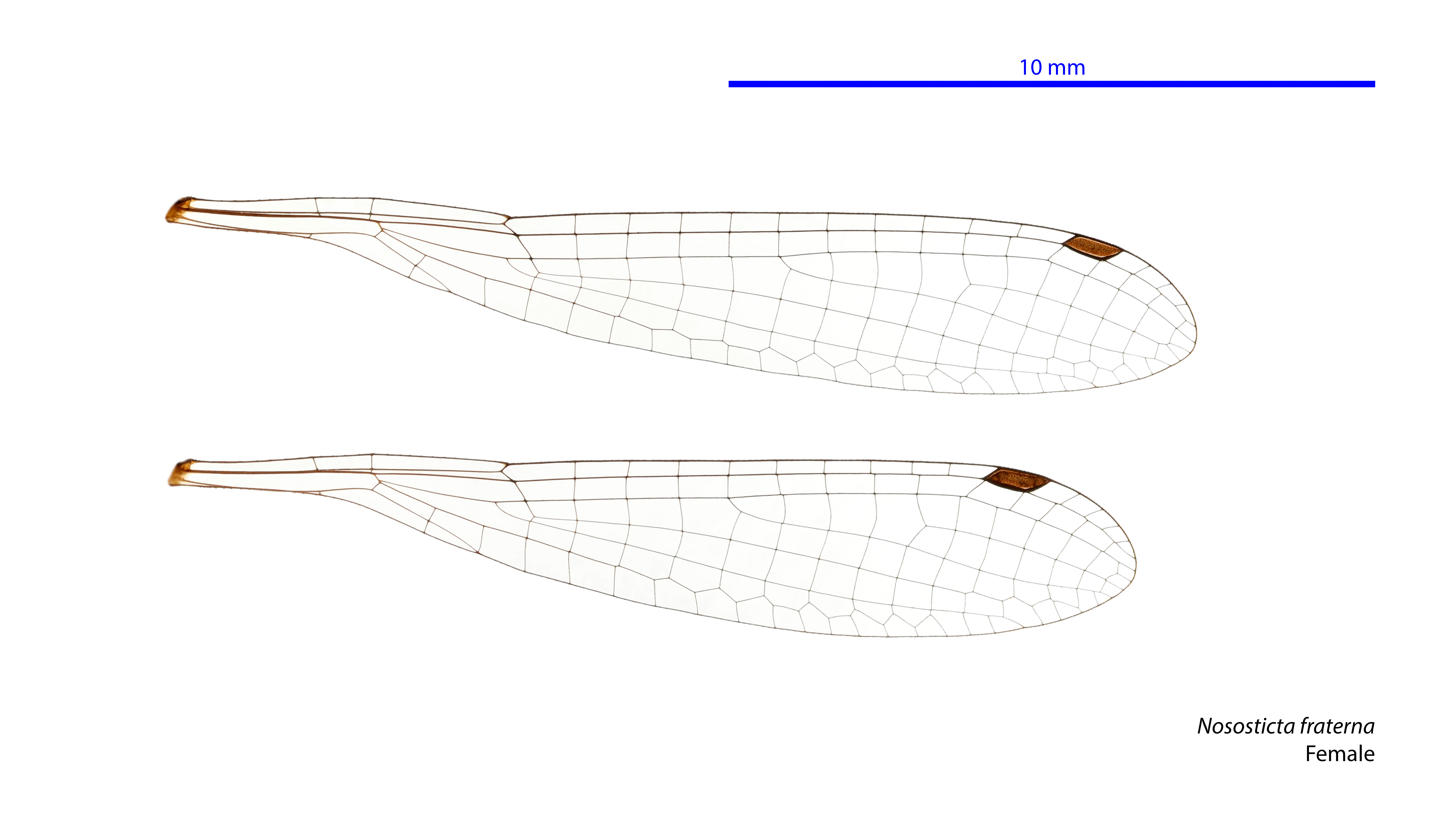
Female wings

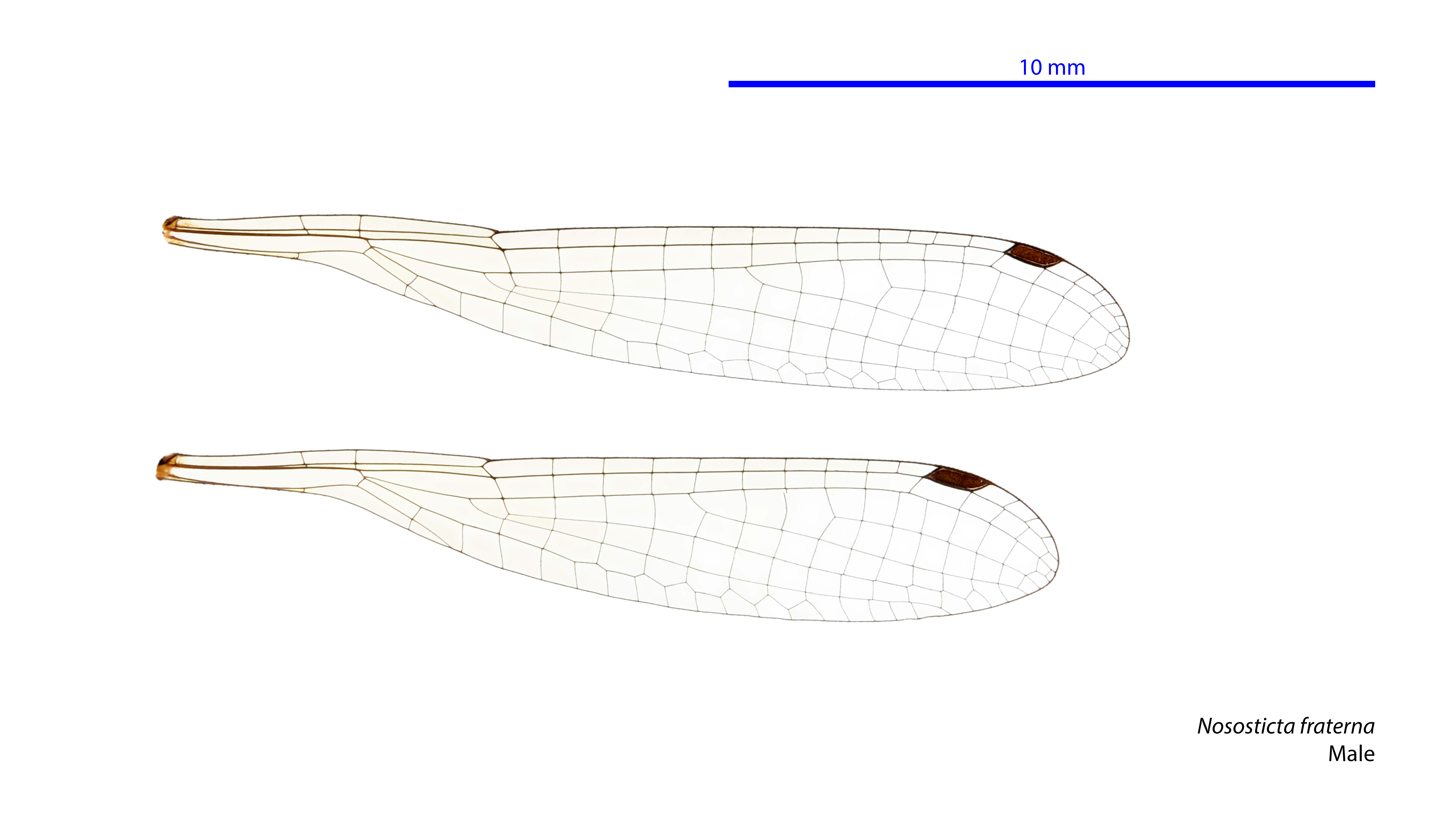
Male wings

== See also ==
- List of Odonata species of Australia
