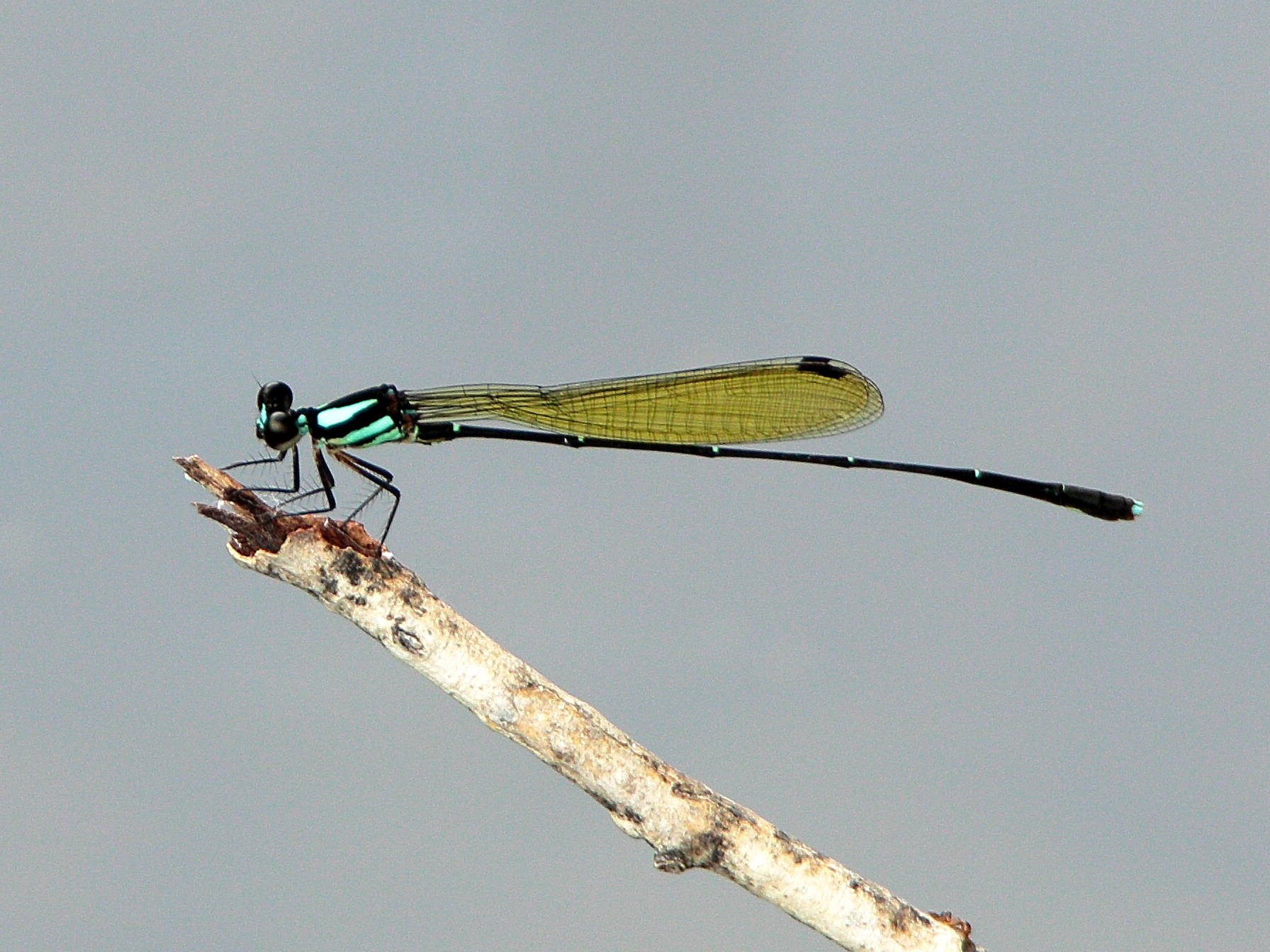
- Green-blue threadtail (male)
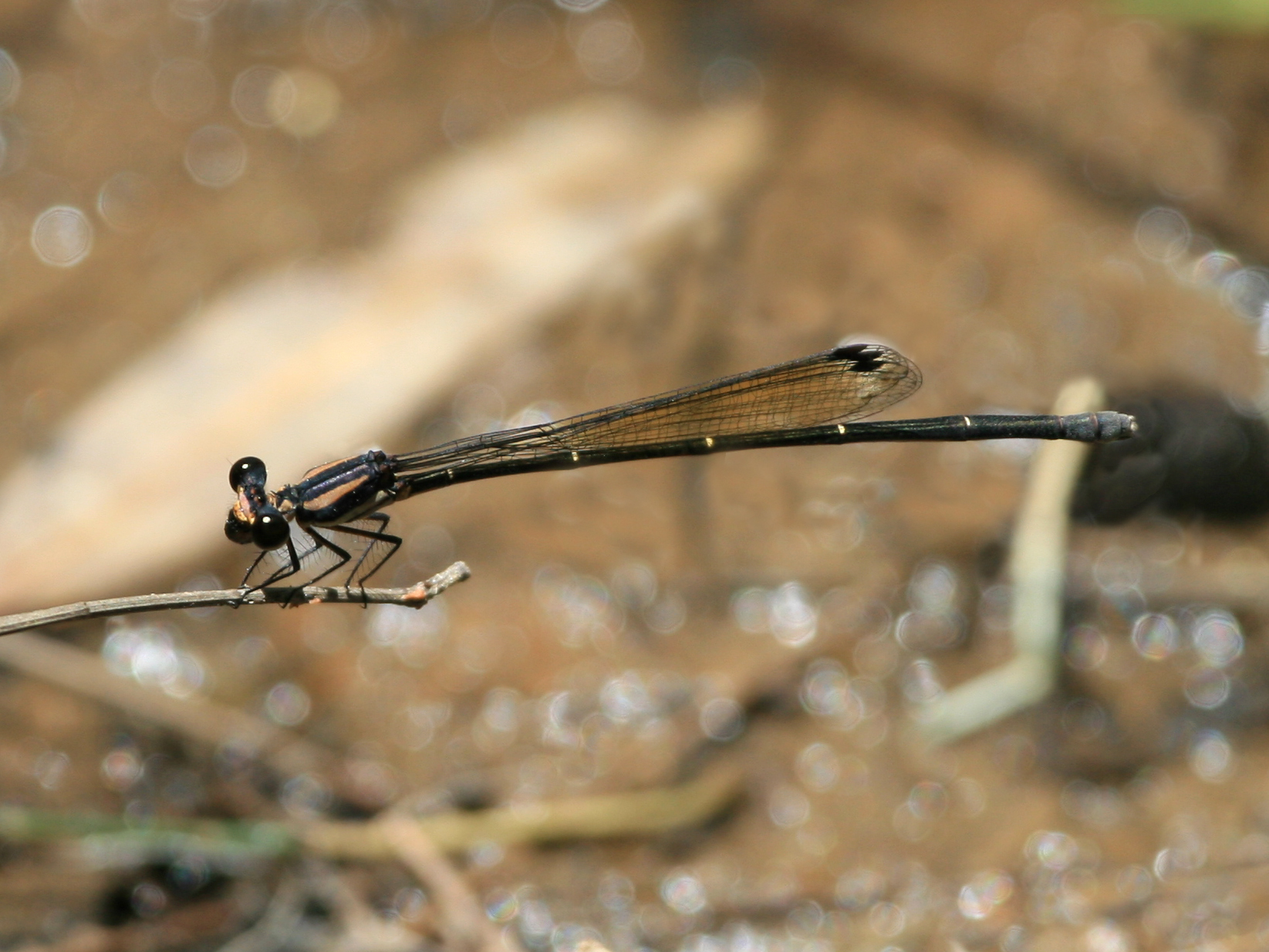
- Green-blue threadtail (female)

Conservation status
- Least Concern (IUCN 3.1)

Scientific classification
- Kingdom: Animalia
- Phylum: Arthropoda
- Clade: Pancrustacea
- Class: Insecta
- Order: Odonata
- Suborder: Zygoptera
- Family: Platycnemididae
- Genus: Nososticta
- Species: N. coelestina

Binomial name
- Nososticta coelestina (Tillyard, 1906)

Synonyms
- Alloneura coelestina Tillyard, 1906

= Nososticta coelestina =

Green-blue threadtail

Species of damselfly

Nososticta coelestina is an Australian species of damselfly in the family Platycnemididae, commonly known as the green-blue threadtail.

Its usual habitat is near rivers and streams. The adult is a medium-sized damselfly with a length of 35 to 40mm, and wingspan similar to its length. The thorax is black with vivid greenish-blue markings in the male, and pale brown in the female. The abdomen is dark with pale narrow bands between abdominal segments. The wings are tinted with yellow or lemon. In Australia, the distribution is in suitable habitat in the north and eastern part of the continent from the top end of the Northern Territory to central Queensland. The taxon has been assessed in the IUCN Red List as being of Least Concern.

== Etymology ==
The genus name Nososticta combines the Greek νόσος (nosos, "disease") with στικτός (stiktos, "spotted" or "marked"). The suffix -sticta is commonly used in names of taxa related to Protoneura and the subfamily Isostictinae.

The species name coelestina is derived from the Latin caelestis ("heavenly" or "sky-blue"), referring to the pale blue appendages.

== Gallery ==
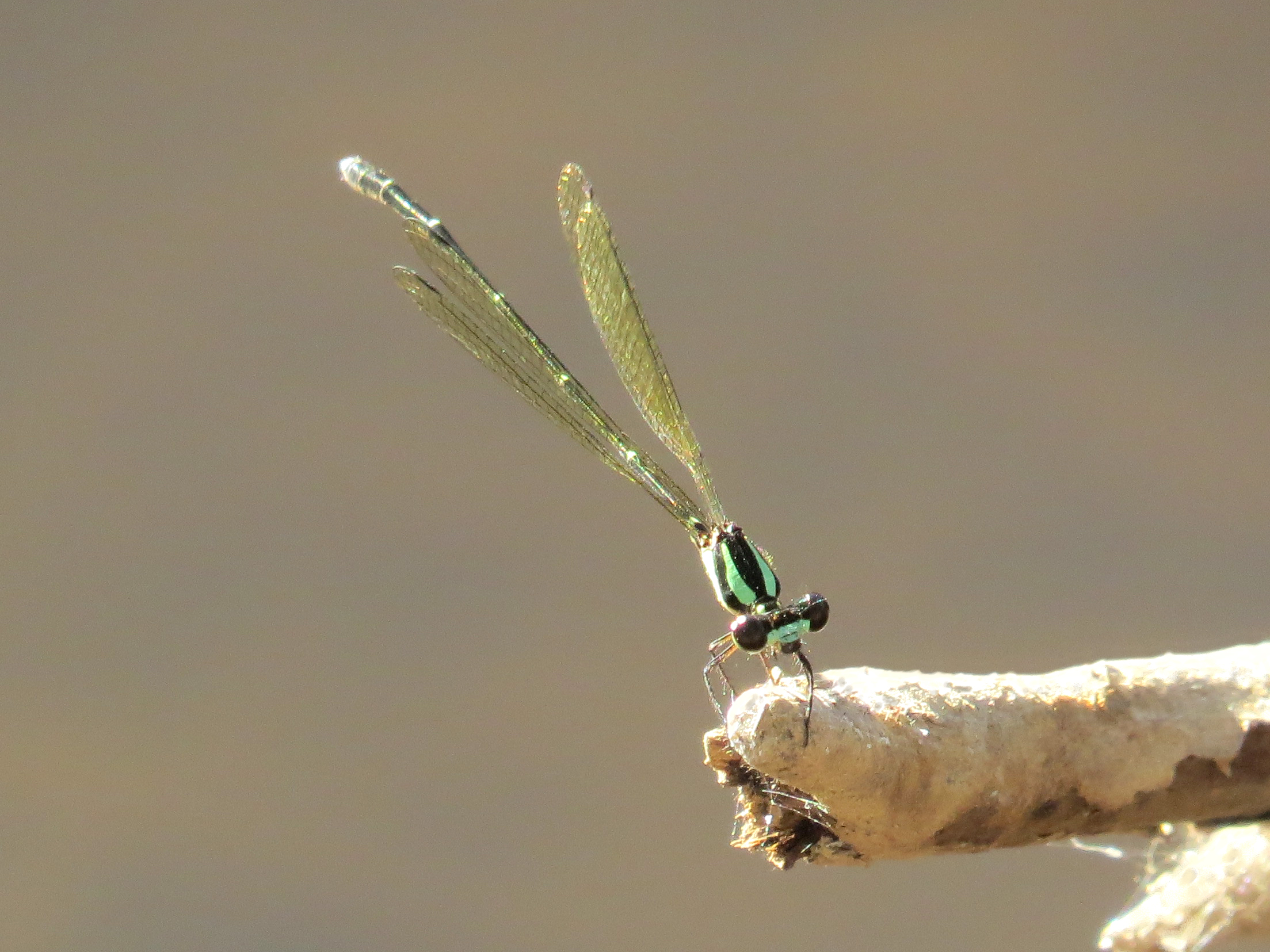
Male

Detail of Nososticta coelestina wing

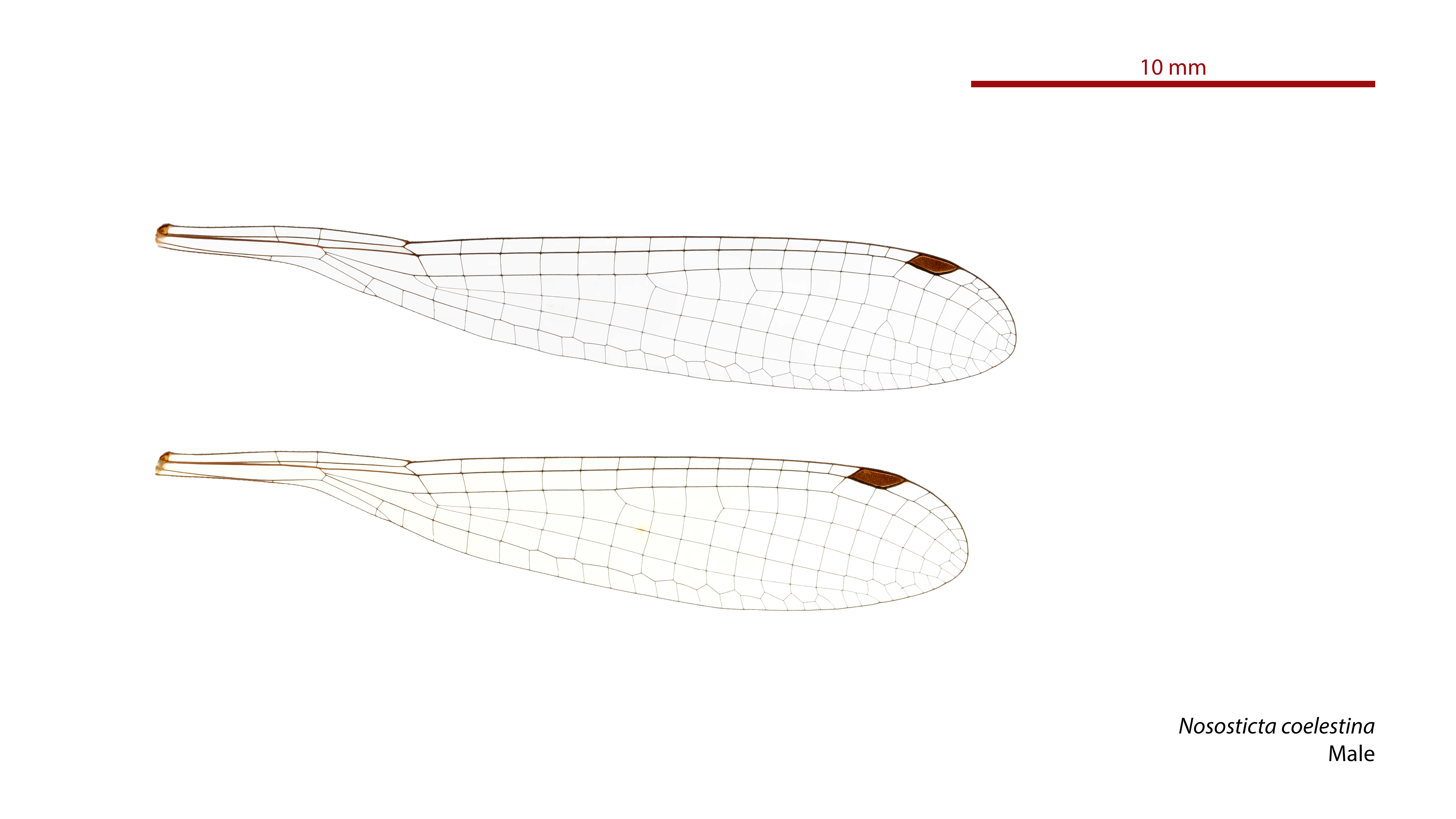
Photo of male wings

== See also ==
- List of Odonata species of Australia
