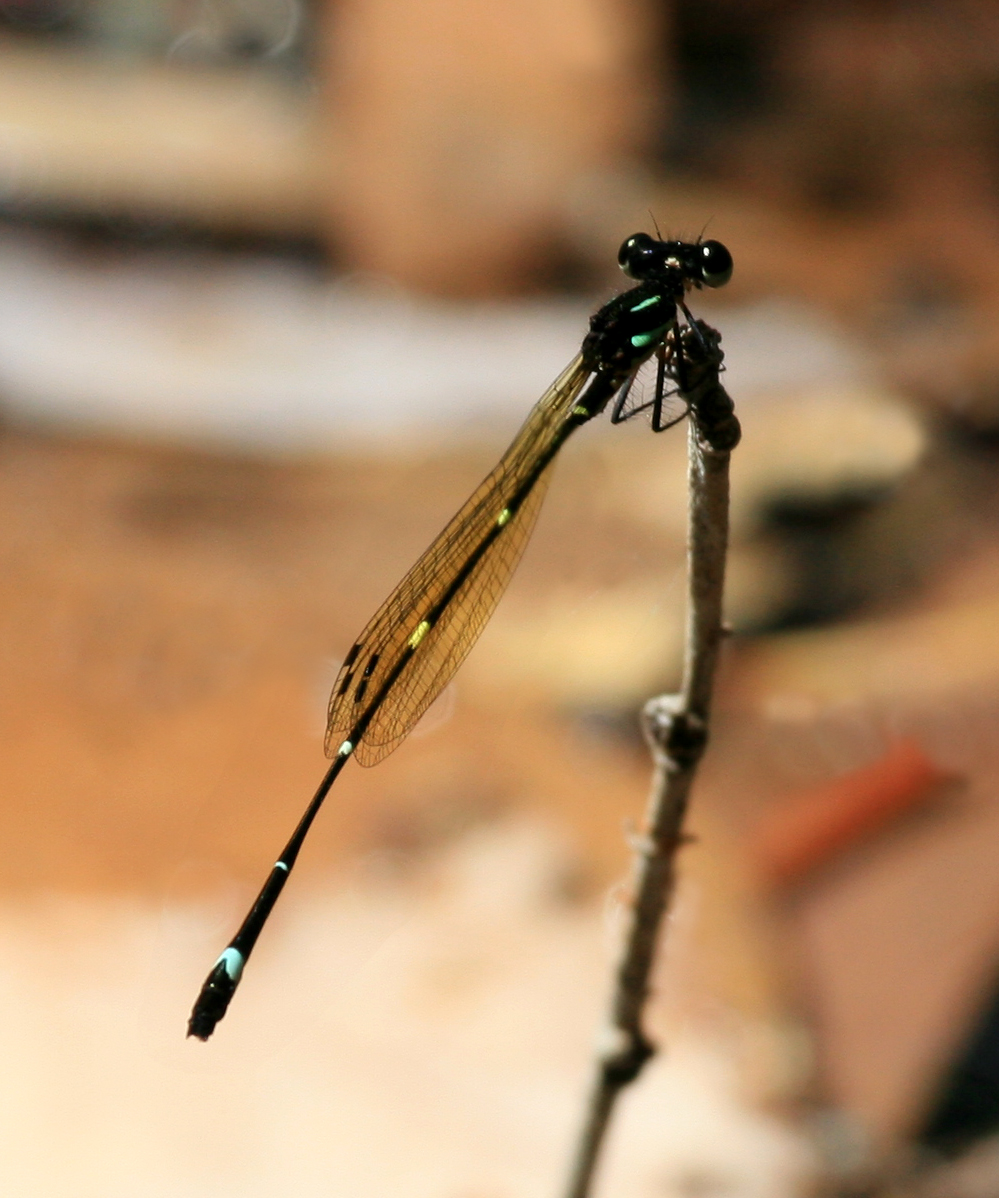
- Nososticta solitaria, Cairns

Scientific classification
- Kingdom: Animalia
- Phylum: Arthropoda
- Clade: Pancrustacea
- Class: Insecta
- Order: Odonata
- Suborder: Zygoptera
- Family: Platycnemididae
- Genus: Nososticta; Hagen, 1860

Synonyms
- Notoneura Tillyard, 1913

= Nososticta =

Genus of damselflies

Nososticta is a genus of damselfly in the family Platycnemididae. Nososticta damselflies are found across a wide range from Africa, through Indonesia to Australia. They are commonly known as Threadtails.

== Etymology ==
The genus name Nososticta combines the Greek νόσος (nosos, "disease") with στικτός (stiktos, "spotted" or "marked"). The suffix -sticta is commonly used in names of taxa related to Protoneura and the subfamily Isostictinae.

== Species ==
The genus Nososticta includes the following species:

- Nososticta acudens Theischinger & Richards, 2006
- Nososticta acuminata Michalski, Richards & Theischinger, 2012
- Nososticta africana (Schmidt, 1944)
- Nososticta astrolabica (Förster, 1898)
- Nososticta atrocyana (Lieftinck, 1960)
- Nososticta aurantiaca (Lieftinck, 1938)
- Nososticta azurosignata Theischinger & Richards, 2015
- Nososticta baroalba Watson & Theischinger, 1983
- Nososticta beatrix (Lieftinck, 1949)
- Nososticta boonei Theischinger, Mitchell, Richards & Polhemus, 2023
- Nososticta caelestis Theischinger & Richards, 2016
- Nososticta caerulea Theischinger & Richards, 2015
- Nososticta callisphaena (Lieftinck, 1937)
- Nososticta chalybeostoma (Lieftinck, 1932)
- Nososticta chrismulleri Theischinger & Richards, 2016
- Nososticta circumscripta (Selys, 1886)
- Nososticta coelestina (Tillyard, 1906)
- Nososticta commutata (Lieftinck, 1938)
- Nososticta conifera Theischinger & Richards, 2006
- Nososticta cyanura (Lieftinck, 1932)
- Nososticta diadesma (Lieftinck, 1936)
- Nososticta digimu Theischinger, Polhemus & Richards, 2022
- Nososticta dora Kovács & Theischinger, 2016
- Nososticta dorsonigra (Martin, 1902)
- Nososticta eburnea (Förster, 1897)
- Nososticta egregia (Lieftinck, 1937)
- Nososticta emphyla (Lieftinck, 1936)
- Nososticta erythroprocta (Selys, 1886)
- Nososticta erythrura (Lieftinck, 1932)
- Nososticta evelynae (Lieftinck, 1960)
- Nososticta exul (Selys, 1886)
- Nososticta finisterrae (Förster, 1897)
- Nososticta flavipennis (Selys, 1886)
- Nososticta fonticola (Lieftinck, 1932)
- Nososticta fraterna (Lieftinck, 1933)
- Nososticta halmahera Theischinger, Lupiyaningdyah & Richards, 2015
- Nososticta hedigeri Theischinger, Mitchell, Richards & Polhemus, 2023
- Nososticta hiroakii Sasamoto, 2007
- Nososticta impercepta Seehausen & Theischinger, 2017
- Nososticta insignis (Selys, 1886)
- Nososticta interrupta Theischinger & Richards, 2015
- Nososticta irene (Lieftinck, 1949)
- Nososticta kaizei Theischinger & Richards, 2015
- Nososticta kalumburu Watson & Theischinger, 1984
- Nososticta koolpinyah Watson & Theischinger, 1984
- Nososticta koongarra Watson & Theischinger, 1984
- Nososticta liveringa Watson & Theischinger, 1984
- Nososticta longicauda Theischinger & Richards, 2015
- Nososticta makrodon Theischinger & Richards, 2016
- Nososticta manuscola Theischinger & Richards, 2015
- Nososticta marina (Ris, 1913)
- Nososticta megantereon Theischinger & Richards, 2016
- Nososticta melanoxantha (Lieftinck, 1949)
- Nososticta moginae Theischinger & Richards, 2018
- Nososticta moluccensis (Selys, 1886)
- Nososticta mouldsi Theischinger, 2000
- Nososticta nancowra Rajeshkumar, 2018
- Nososticta nicobarica Rajeshkumar, Raghunathan & Chandra, 2017
- Nososticta nigrifrons (Ris, 1913)
- Nososticta nigrofasciata (Lieftinck, 1932)
- Nososticta oculata Theischinger & Richards, 2015
- Nososticta ovimacula Theischinger & Richards, 2016
- Nososticta paraconifera Theischinger & Richards, 2016
- Nososticta parafonticola Theischinger & Richards, 2015
- Nososticta peti Kovács & Theischinger, 2023
- Nososticta phoenissa (Ris, 1929)
- Nososticta pilbara Watson, 1969
- Nososticta plagiata (Selys, 1886)
- Nososticta plagioxantha (Lieftinck, 1932)
- Nososticta pseudexul (Ris, 1913)
- Nososticta purari Theischinger, Richards & Toko, 2019
- Nososticta pyroprocta (Lieftinck, 1960)
- Nososticta rangifera (Lieftinck, 1949)
- Nososticta rosea (Ris, 1913)
- Nososticta rufipes Theischinger & Kalkman, 2014
- Nososticta salomonis (Selys, 1886)
- Nososticta selysii (Förster, 1896)
- Nososticta silvicola (Lieftinck, 1949)
- Nososticta smilodon Theischinger & Richards, 2006
- Nososticta solida Hagen in Selys, 1860
- Nososticta solitaria (Tillyard, 1906)
- Nososticta stueberi Theischinger et al., 2023
- Nososticta tagula Theischinger et al., 2023
- Nososticta taracumbi Watson & Theischinger, 1984
- Nososticta thalassina (Lieftinck, 1949)
- Nososticta tricolorata Theischinger & Richards, 2015
- Nososticta truncata Theischinger & Richards, 2015
- Nososticta wallacii (Selys, 1886)
- Nososticta xanthe (Lieftinck, 1938)

== See also ==
- List of Odonata species of Australia
