= Nososticta liveringa =

Malachite threadtail

Conservation status
- Least Concern (IUCN 3.1)

Scientific classification
- Kingdom: Animalia
- Phylum: Arthropoda
- Clade: Pancrustacea
- Class: Insecta
- Order: Odonata
- Suborder: Zygoptera
- Family: Platycnemididae
- Genus: Nososticta
- Species: N. liveringa

Binomial name
- Nososticta liveringa Watson & Theischinger, 1984

Species of damselfly

Nososticta liveringa is a species of Australian damselfly in the family Platycnemididae, commonly known as a malachite threadtail. It is endemic to northern Western Australia and western Northern Territory, where it inhabits streams and lagoons.

Nososticta liveringa is a small, slender damselfly coloured black with a pale green stripe and yellow markings. Wings may be slightly tinted with yellow.

== Etymology ==
The genus name Nososticta combines the Greek νόσος (nosos, "disease") with στικτός (stiktos, "spotted" or "marked"). The suffix -sticta is commonly used in names of taxa related to Protoneura and the subfamily Isostictinae.

The species name liveringa is likely named for Liveringa, in the Kimberley region of Western Australia, near where the original specimens of this species were collected.

== Gallery ==
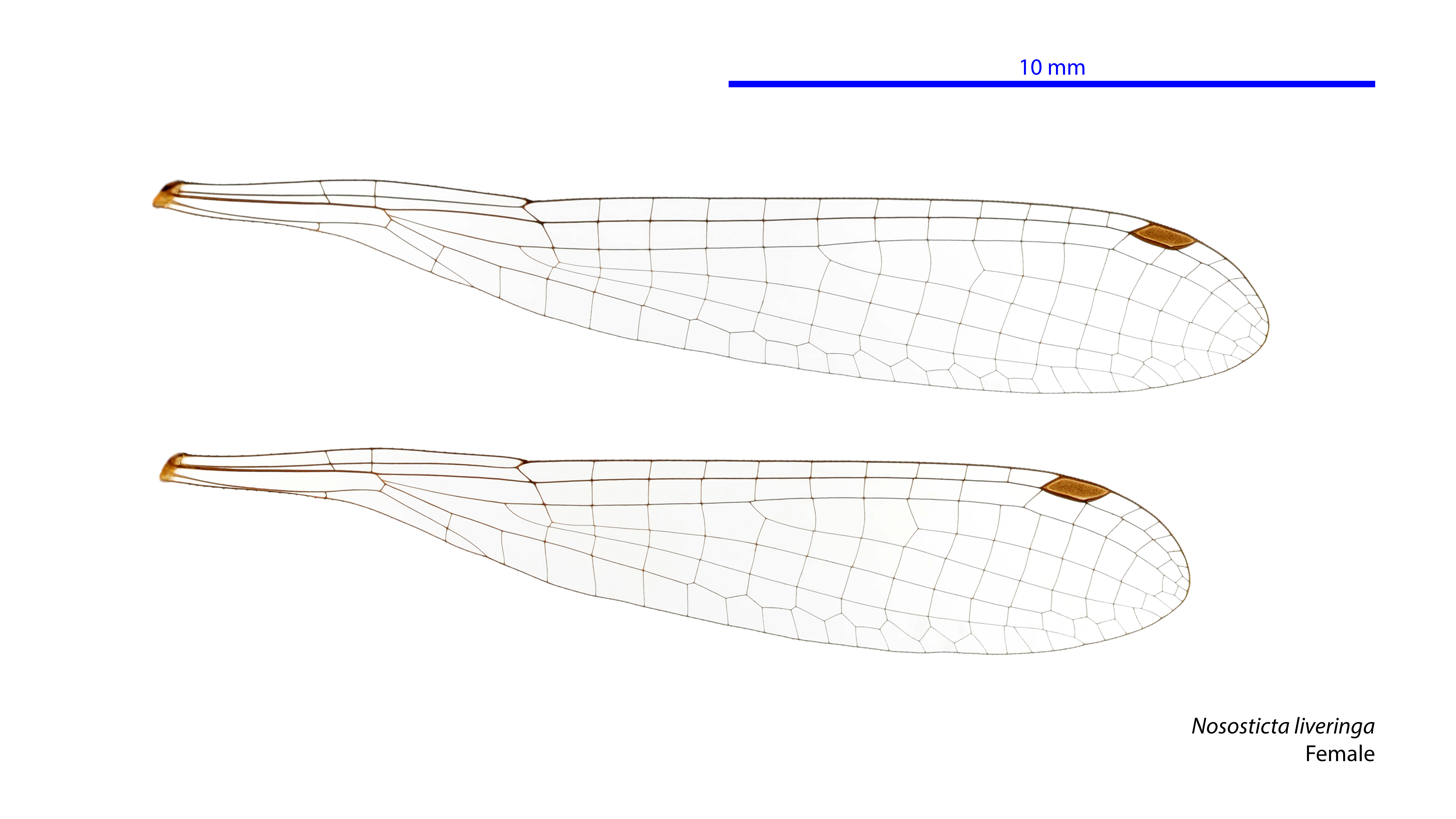
Female wings

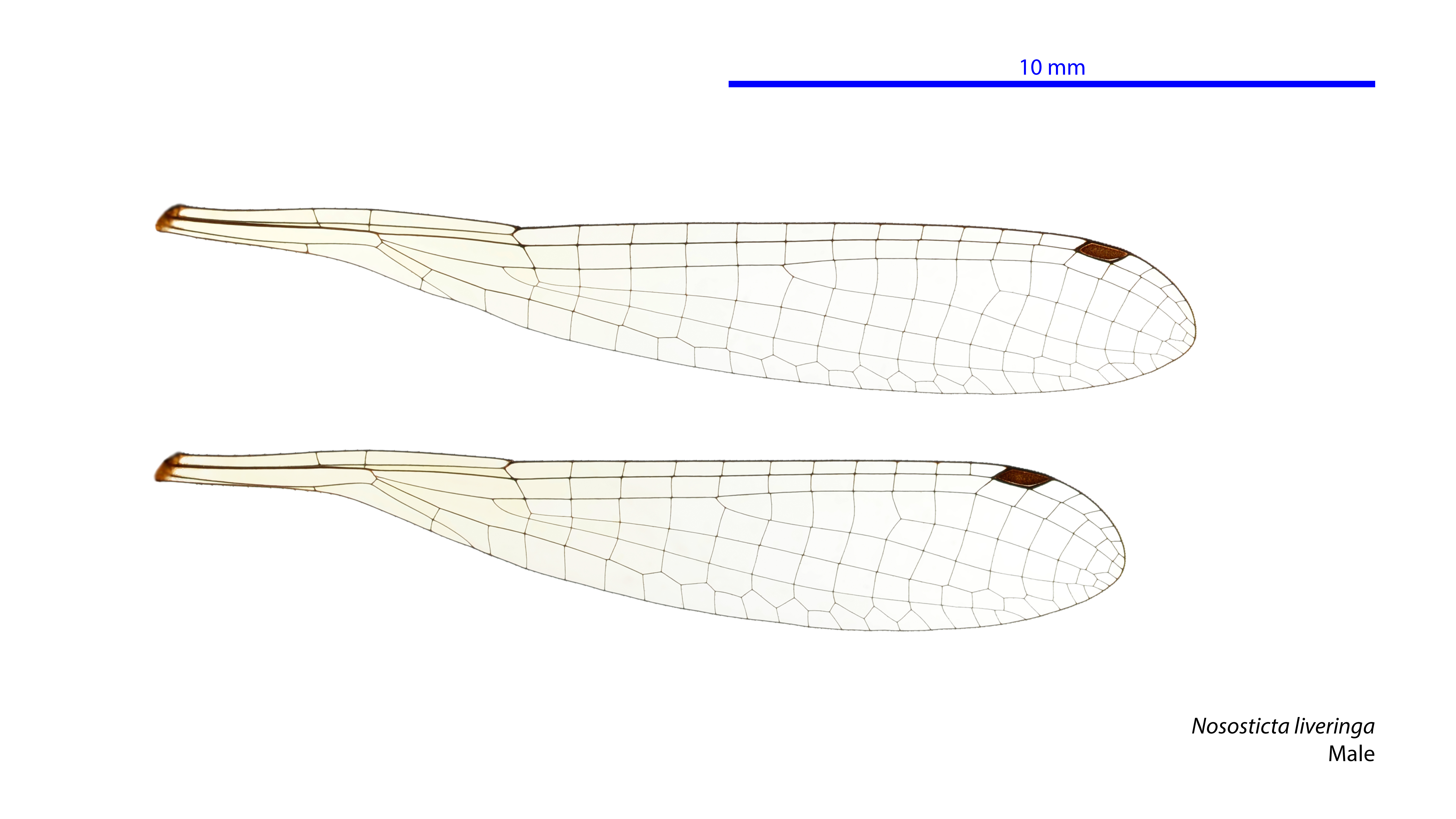
Male wings

== See also ==
- List of Odonata species of Australia
