= Nososticta baroalba =

Black-winged threadtail

Conservation status
- Least Concern (IUCN 3.1)

Scientific classification
- Kingdom: Animalia
- Phylum: Arthropoda
- Clade: Pancrustacea
- Class: Insecta
- Order: Odonata
- Suborder: Zygoptera
- Family: Platycnemididae
- Genus: Nososticta
- Species: N. baroalba

Binomial name
- Nososticta baroalba Watson & Theischinger, 1984

Species of damselfly

Nososticta baroalba is a species of Australian damselfly in the family Platycnemididae, commonly known as a black-winged threadtail. It has only been found in the Northern Territory, where it inhabits streams.

Nososticta baroalba is a small, slender damselfly, that is coloured black with brown markings, and has dark wings.

== Etymology ==
The genus name Nososticta combines the Greek νόσος (nosos, "disease") with στικτός (stiktos, "spotted" or "marked"). The suffix -sticta is commonly used in names of taxa related to Protoneura and the subfamily Isostictinae.

The species name baroalba is named for Baroalba Creek in the Northern Territory, where the original specimens of this species were collected.

== Gallery ==
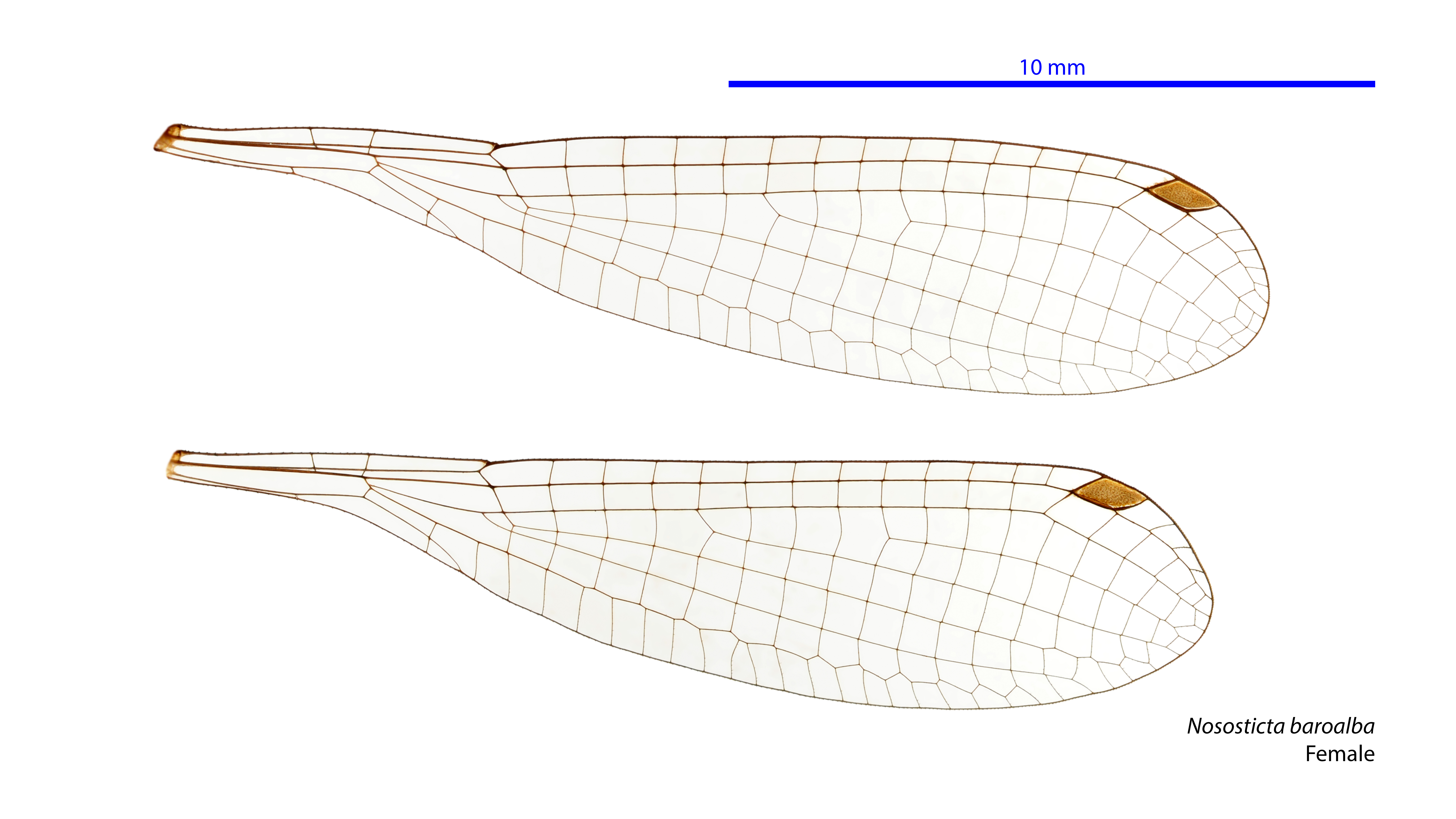
Female wings

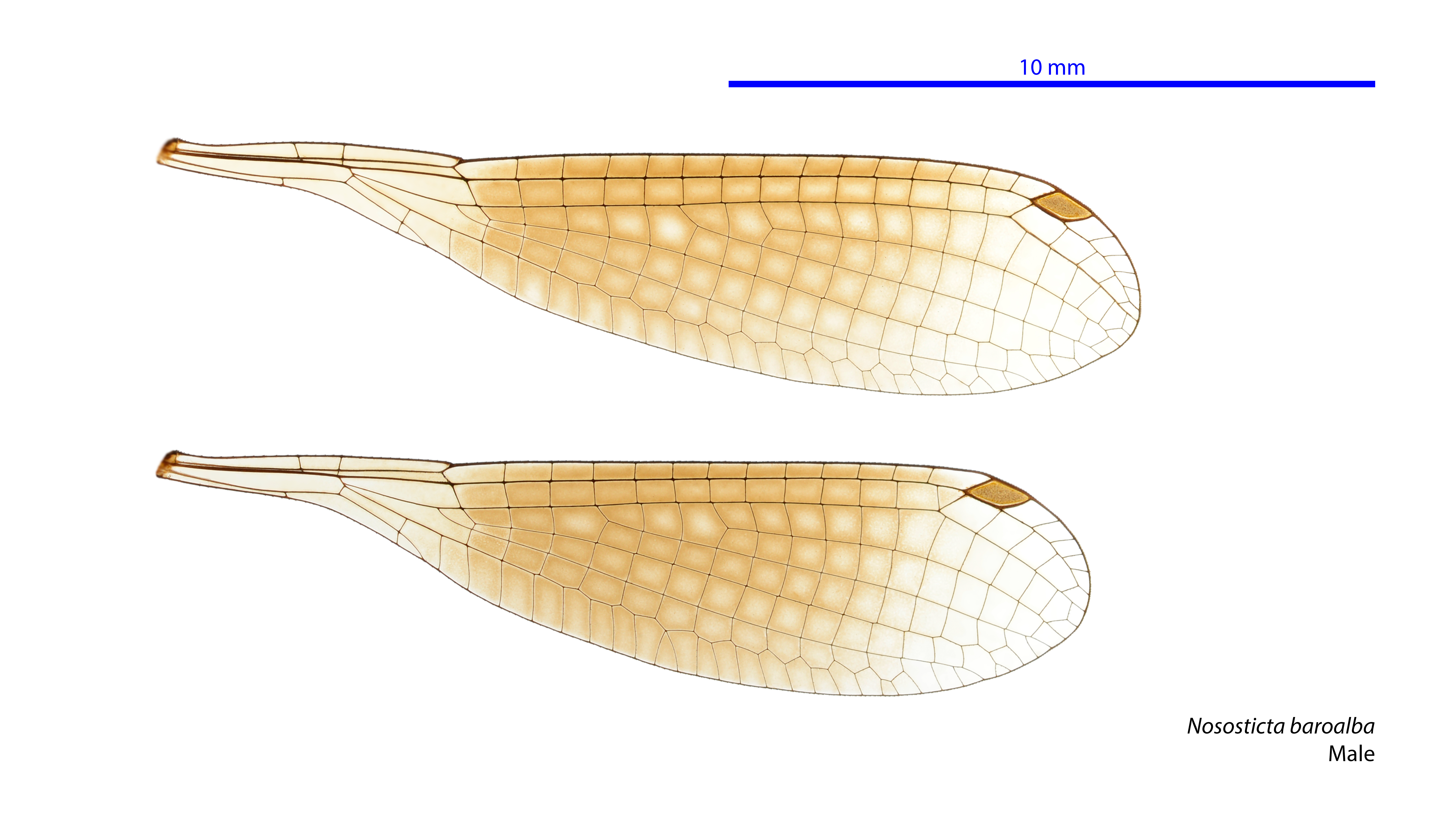
Male wings

== See also ==
- List of Odonata species of Australia
