= Nososticta taracumbi =

Melville Island threadtail

Conservation status
- Vulnerable (IUCN 3.1)

Scientific classification
- Kingdom: Animalia
- Phylum: Arthropoda
- Clade: Pancrustacea
- Class: Insecta
- Order: Odonata
- Suborder: Zygoptera
- Family: Platycnemididae
- Genus: Nososticta
- Species: N. taracumbi

Binomial name
- Nososticta taracumbi Watson & Theischinger, 1984

Species of damselfly

Nososticta taracumbi is a species of Australian damselfly in the family Platycnemididae, commonly known as a Melville Island threadtail. It is endemic to Melville Island, Northern Territory, where it inhabits streams.

Nososticta taracumbi is a small, slender damselfly, coloured black with bright blue and white markings in the male, and ochre-like colouring in the female. Wings have a brown-yellowish tinge.

== Etymology ==
The genus name Nososticta combines the Greek νόσος (nosos, "disease") with στικτός (stiktos, "spotted" or "marked"). The suffix -sticta is commonly used in names of taxa related to Protoneura and the subfamily Isostictinae.

The species name taracumbi is named for Taracumbi Falls on Melville Island in the Northern Territory, where the original specimens of this species were collected.

== Gallery ==
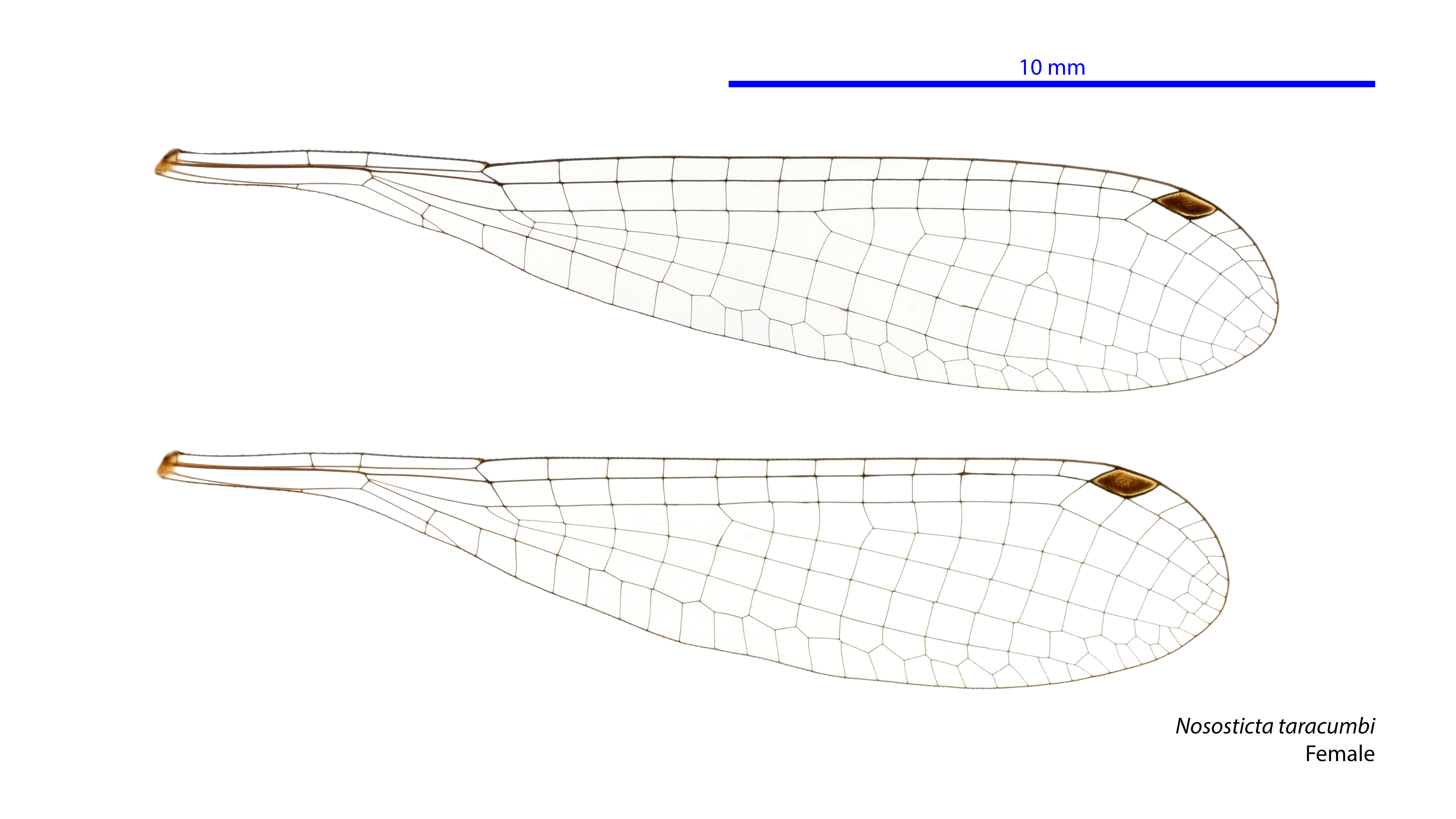
Female wings

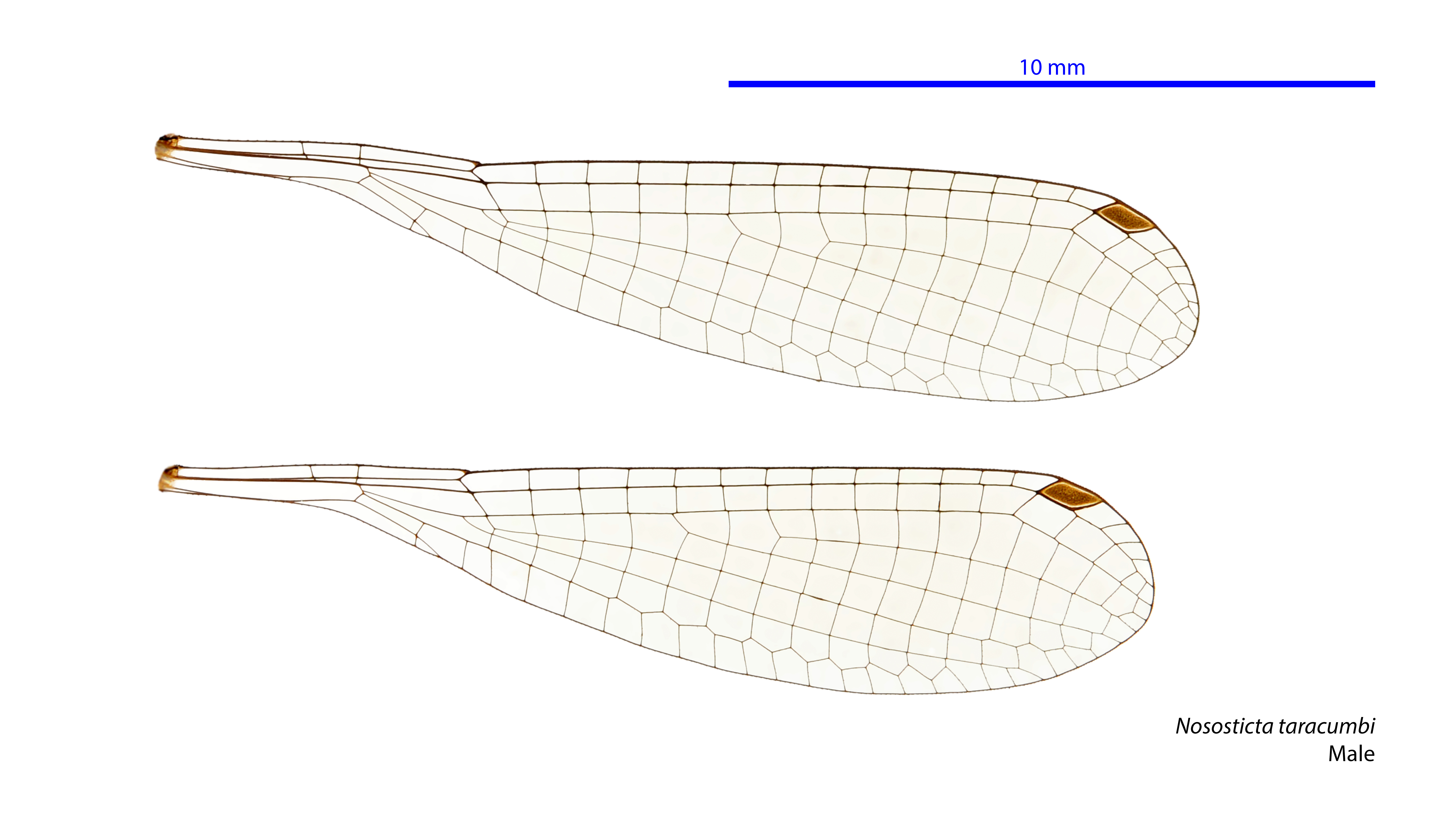
Male wings

== See also ==
- List of Odonata species of Australia
