= Nososticta kalumburu =

Spot-winged threadtail

Conservation status
- Least Concern (IUCN 3.1)

Scientific classification
- Kingdom: Animalia
- Phylum: Arthropoda
- Clade: Pancrustacea
- Class: Insecta
- Order: Odonata
- Suborder: Zygoptera
- Family: Platycnemididae
- Genus: Nososticta
- Species: N. kalumburu

Binomial name
- Nososticta kalumburu Watson & Theischinger, 1984

Species of damselfly

Nososticta kalumburu is a species of Australian damselfly in the family Platycnemididae, commonly known as a spot-winged threadtail. It has only been found in the Kimberley region of Western Australia, where it inhabits streams.

Nososticta kalumburu is a small, slender damselfly, that is coloured green-black with brown markings; males have wings with a strongly defined dark band.

== Etymology ==
The genus name Nososticta combines the Greek νόσος (nosos, "disease") with στικτός (stiktos, "spotted" or "marked"). The suffix -sticta is commonly used in names of taxa related to Protoneura and the subfamily Isostictinae.

The species name kalumburu is named for Kalumburu in the eastern Kimberley region of Western Australia, near where the original specimens of this species were collected.

== Gallery ==
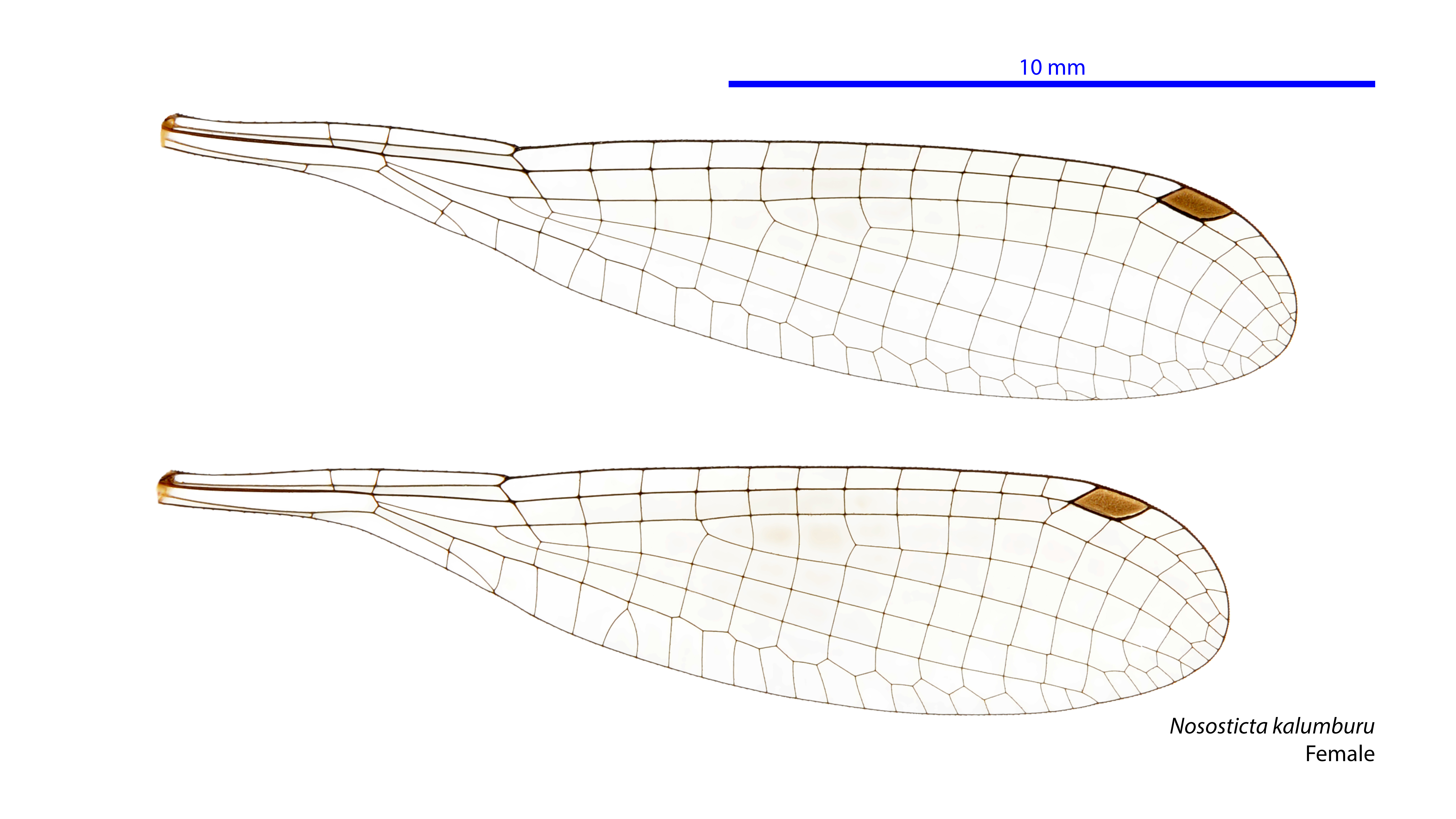
Female wings

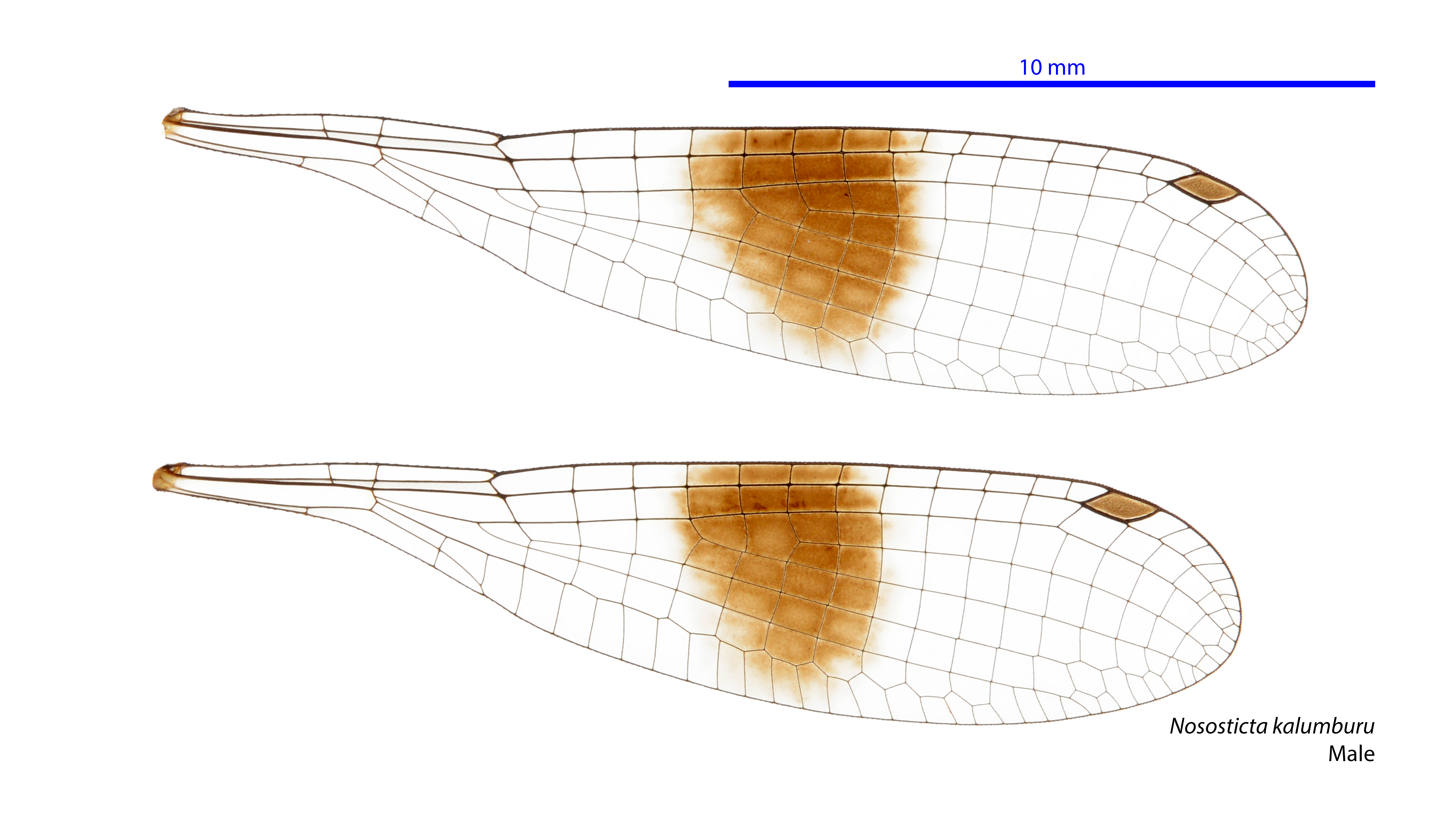
Male wings

== See also ==
- List of Odonata species of Australia
