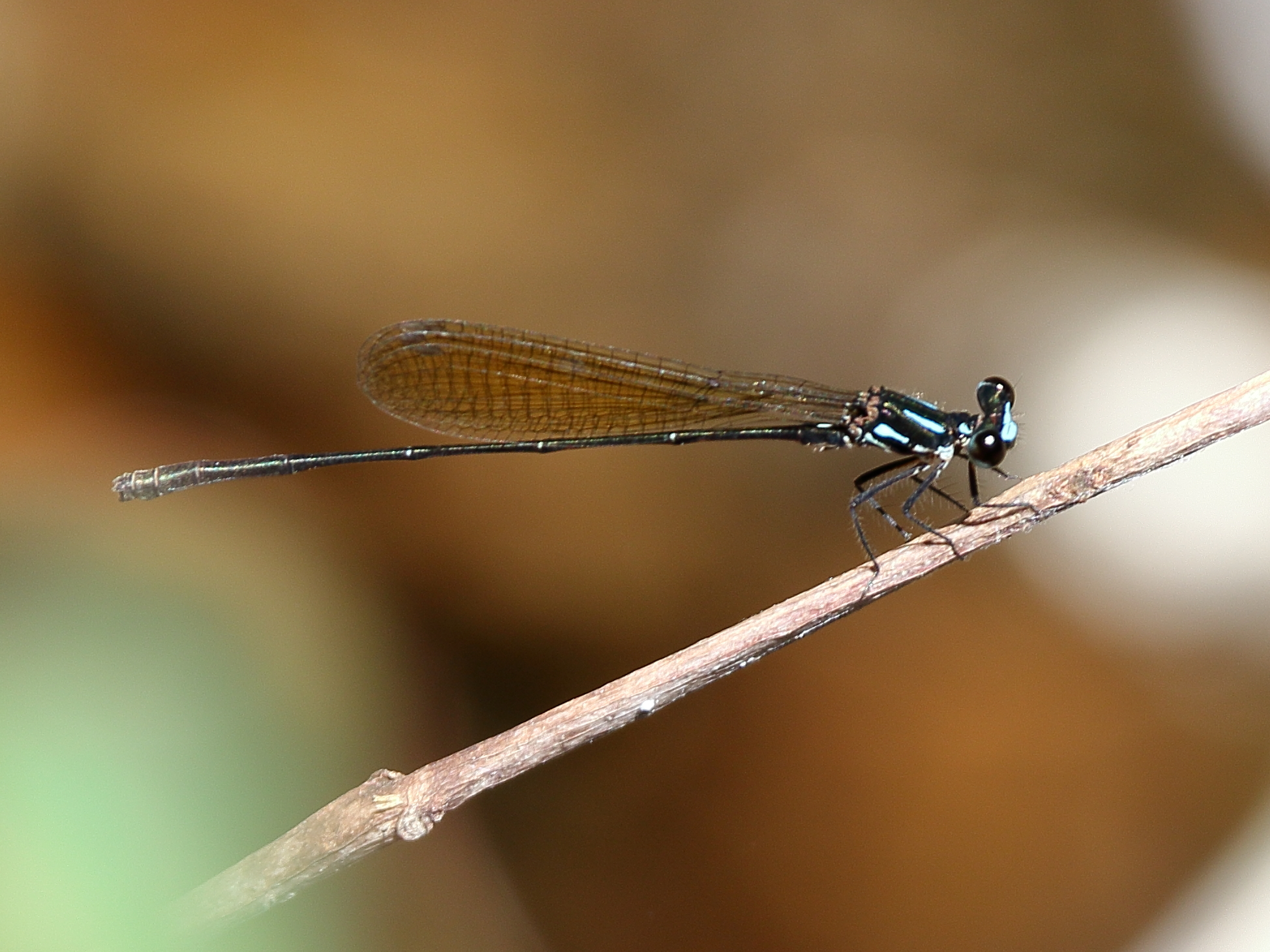
- Nososticta mouldsi

Conservation status
- Data Deficient (IUCN 3.1)

Scientific classification
- Kingdom: Animalia
- Phylum: Arthropoda
- Clade: Pancrustacea
- Class: Insecta
- Order: Odonata
- Suborder: Zygoptera
- Family: Platycnemididae
- Genus: Nososticta
- Species: N. mouldsi

Binomial name
- Nososticta mouldsi Theischinger, 2000

= Nososticta mouldsi =

Striped threadtail

Species of damselfly

Nososticta mouldsi is a species of Australian damselfly in the family Platycnemididae, commonly known as a striped threadtail. It has only been found in the Northern Territory, where it inhabits rainforest streams.

Nososticta mouldsi is a small, slender damselfly; the male is black with blue markings, and the female is black with pale yellow-brown markings. As at February 2018 there were just five records of this species on the Atlas of Living Australia.

== Etymology ==
The genus name Nososticta combines the Greek νόσος (nosos, "disease") with στικτός (stiktos, "spotted" or "marked"). The suffix -sticta is commonly used in names of taxa related to Protoneura and the subfamily Isostictinae.

In 2000, Günther Theischinger named this species mouldsi, an eponym honouring Max Moulds, who collected the type specimen.

== Gallery ==
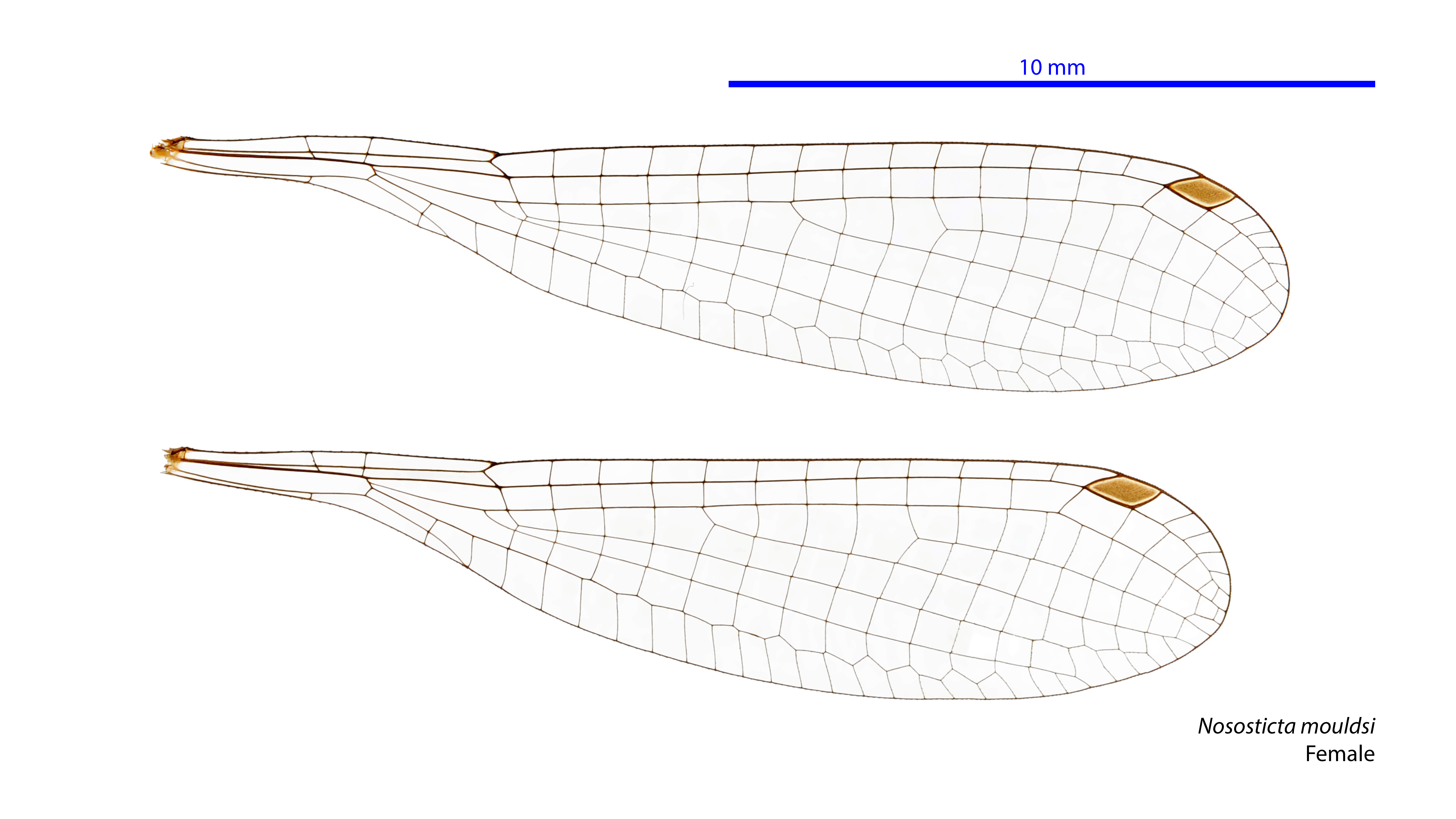
Female wings

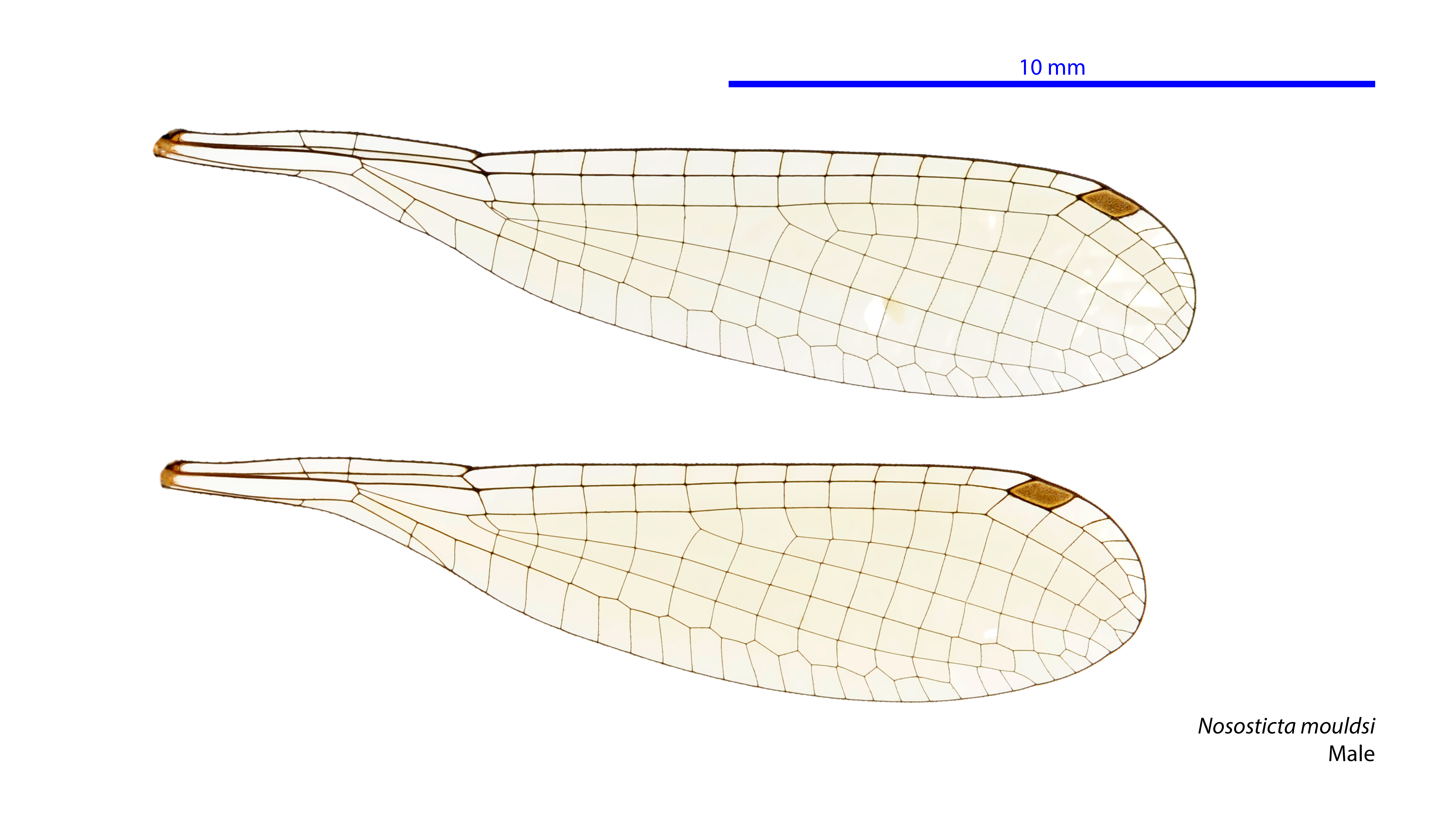
Male wings

== See also ==
- List of Odonata species of Australia
