= Nososticta koongarra =

Citrine threadtail

Conservation status
- Near Threatened (IUCN 3.1)

Scientific classification
- Kingdom: Animalia
- Phylum: Arthropoda
- Clade: Pancrustacea
- Class: Insecta
- Order: Odonata
- Suborder: Zygoptera
- Family: Platycnemididae
- Genus: Nososticta
- Species: N. koongarra

Binomial name
- Nososticta koongarra Watson & Theischinger, 1984

Species of damselfly

Nososticta koongarra is a species of Australian damselfly in the family Platycnemididae, commonly known as a citrine threadtail. It has only been found on the Arnhem Land escarpment in Northern Territory, where it inhabits streams.

Nososticta koongarra is a small, slender damselfly; males are coloured black with bright blue markings and yellow tinted wings, females are black with yellowish-white markings and clear wings.

== Etymology ==
The genus name Nososticta combines the Greek νόσος (nosos, "disease") with στικτός (stiktos, "spotted" or "marked"). The suffix -sticta is commonly used in names of taxa related to Protoneura and the subfamily Isostictinae.

The species name koongarra is named for Koongarra in the Northern Territory, where the original specimens of this species were collected.

== Gallery ==
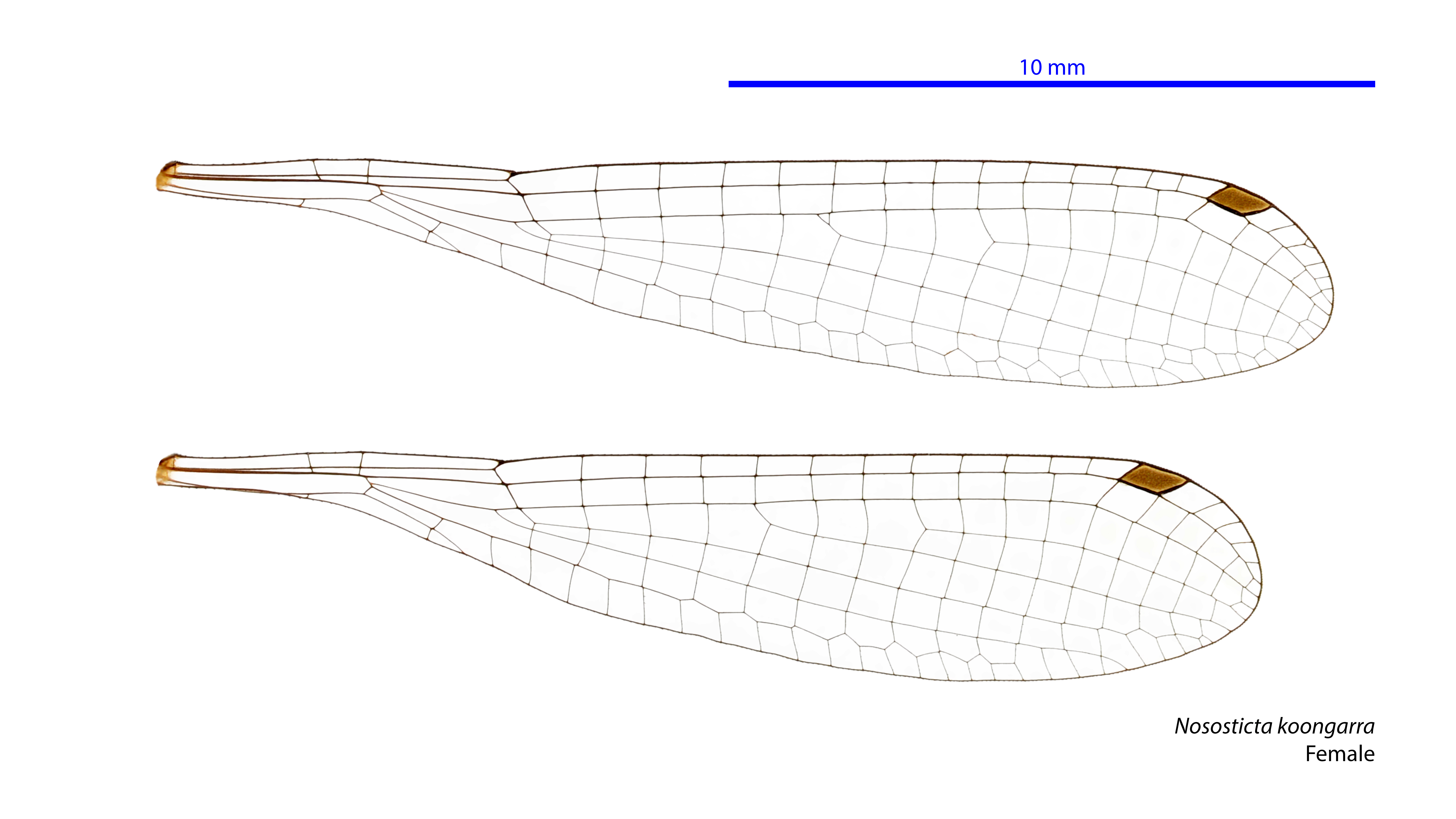
Female wings

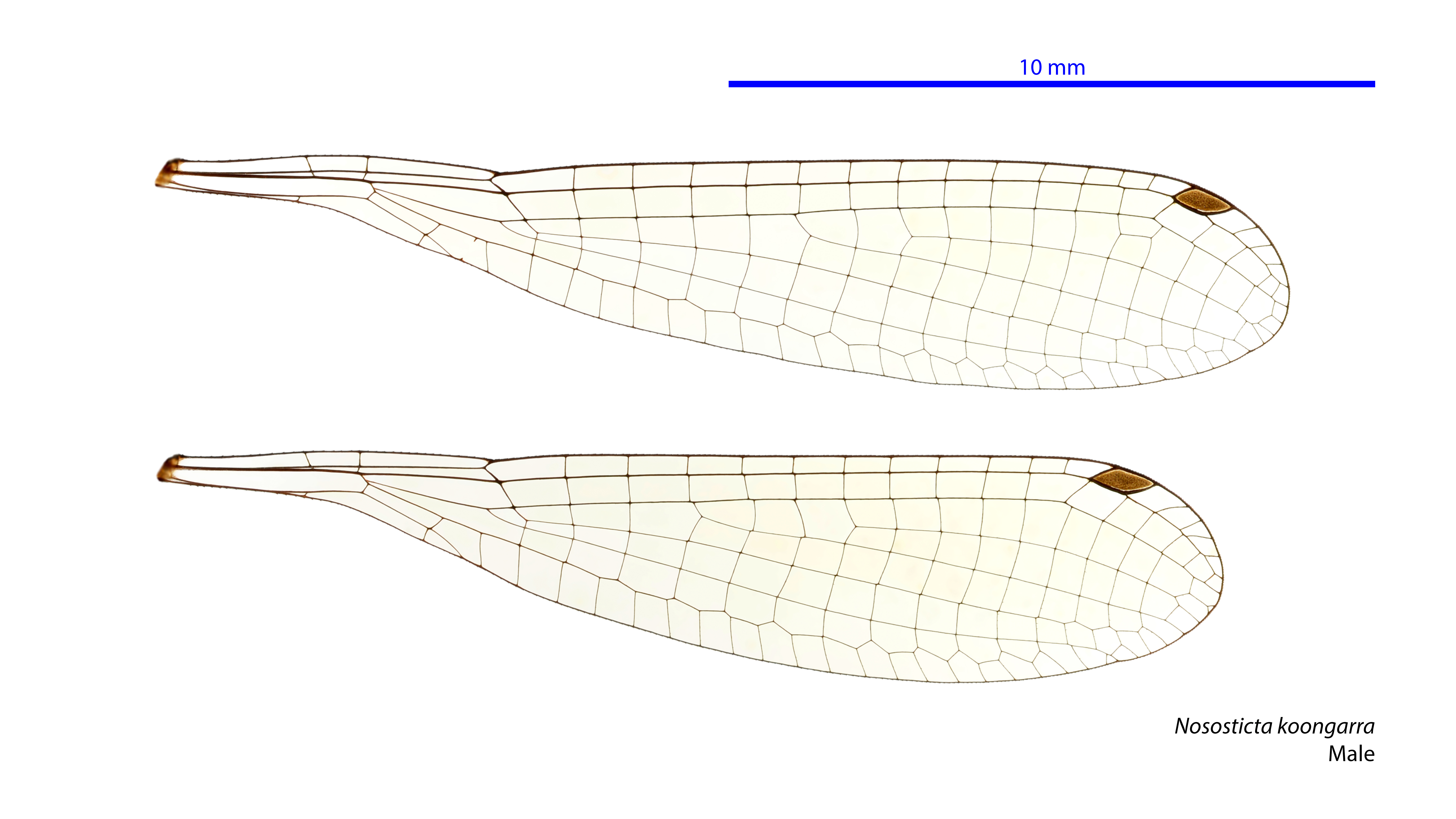
Male wings

== See also ==
- List of Odonata species of Australia
