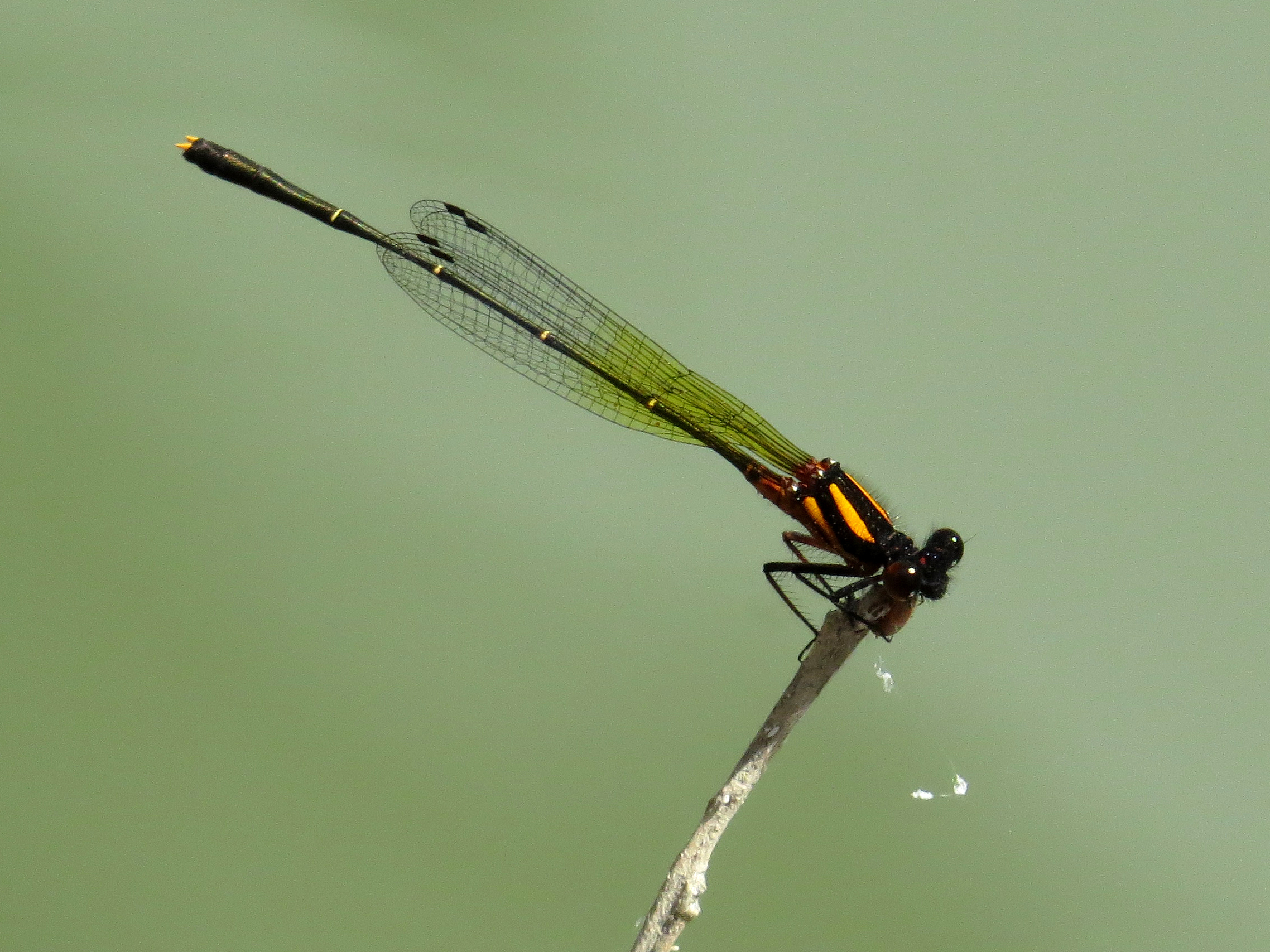
- Male
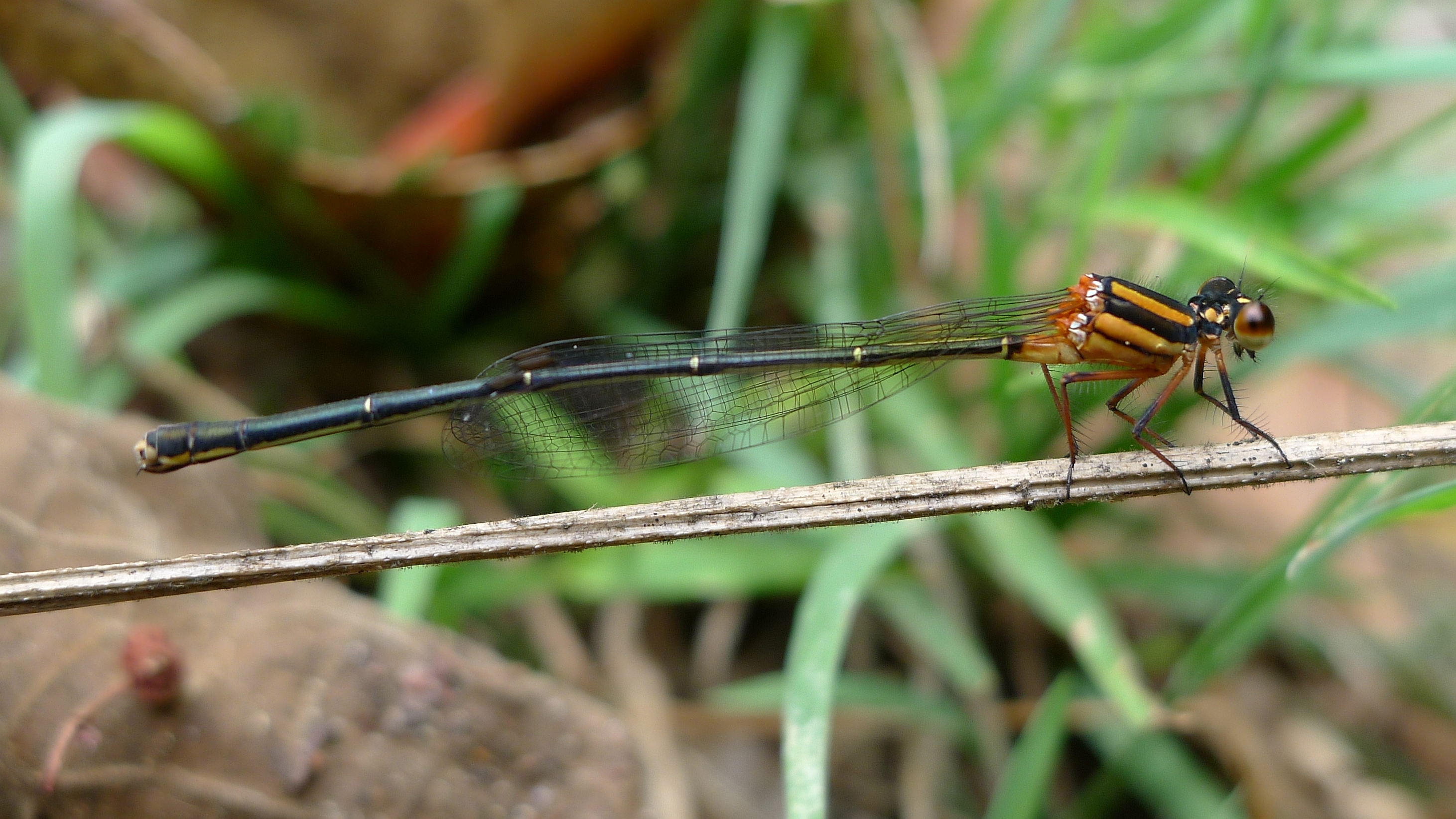
- Female

Conservation status
- Least Concern (IUCN 3.1)

Scientific classification
- Kingdom: Animalia
- Phylum: Arthropoda
- Clade: Pancrustacea
- Class: Insecta
- Order: Odonata
- Suborder: Zygoptera
- Family: Platycnemididae
- Genus: Nososticta
- Species: N. solida

Binomial name
- Nososticta solida (Hagen, 1860)

Synonyms
- Alloneura (Nososticta) solida Hagen, 1860

= Orange threadtail =

Species of damselfly

The orange threadtail or ochre threadtail (Nososticta solida) is an Australian damselfly in the family Platycnemididae. They are medium-sized with a length of around 35mm. Orange threadtails can be found near semi-shaded running water, and usually rest on plants at the water's edge. Orange threadtails may be seen all year round. In Victoria they occur at lower altitudes during summer, though further north they can be seen in spring and autumn. When at rest, Nososticta damselflies hold their wings closely folded up vertically over their thorax. The male threadtails have an orange-yellow thorax with black patterns. Their abdomen is narrow, black in colour with yellow strips. There is a brown yellow colour at the base of their wings. Females are the same size as the males. They are pale brown in colour and have the same black patterns as the males.

== Distribution ==
Orange threadtails are found in eastern Australian States: Queensland, New South Wales, Australian Capital Territory and Victoria.

== Etymology ==
The genus name Nososticta combines the Greek νόσος (nosos, "disease") with στικτός (stiktos, "spotted" or "marked"). The suffix -sticta is commonly used in names of taxa related to Protoneura and the subfamily Isostictinae.

The species name solida is derived from the Latin solidus ("dense", "solid" or "firm"), likely referring to its robust thorax.

== Gallery ==
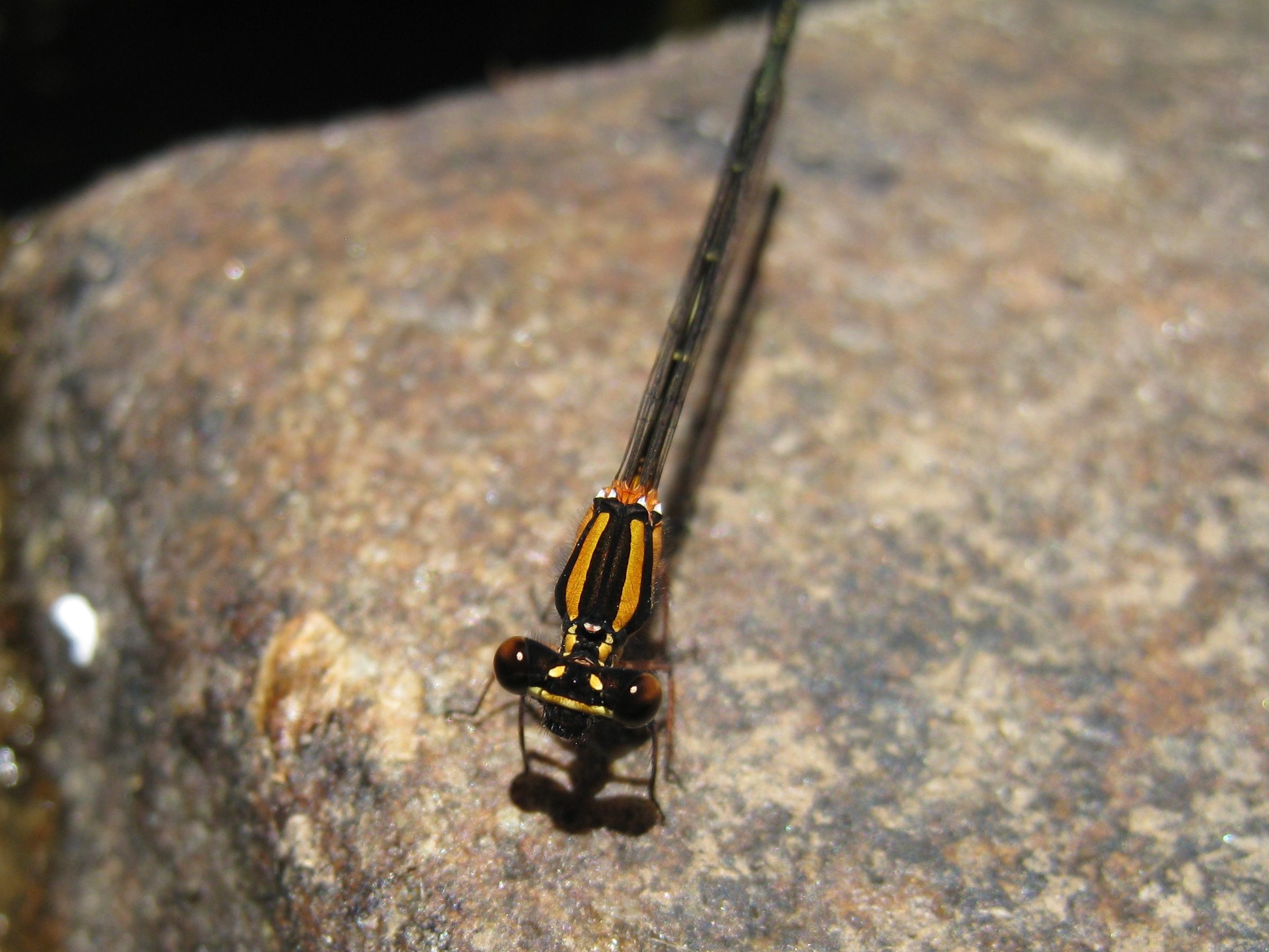
Male

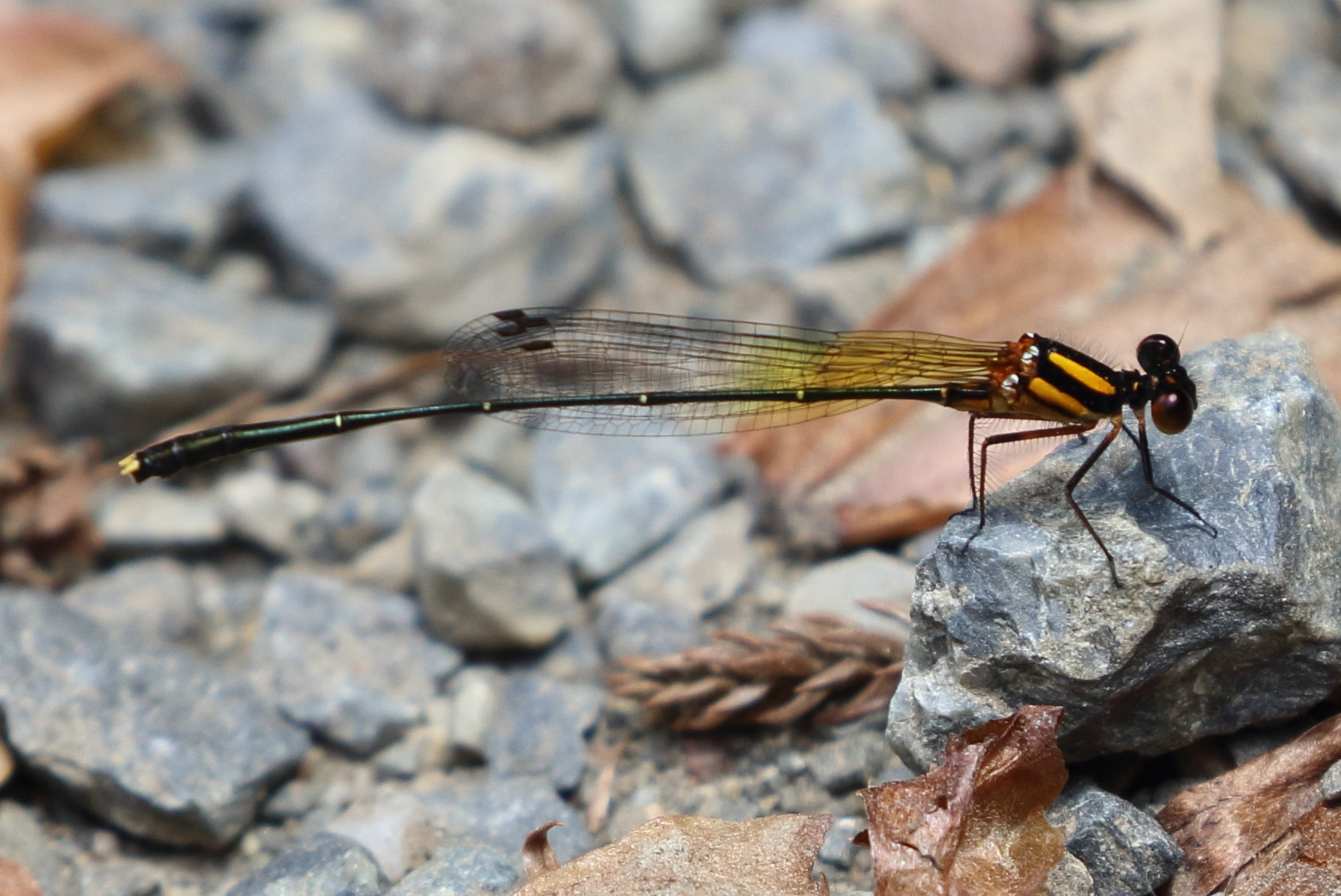
Male

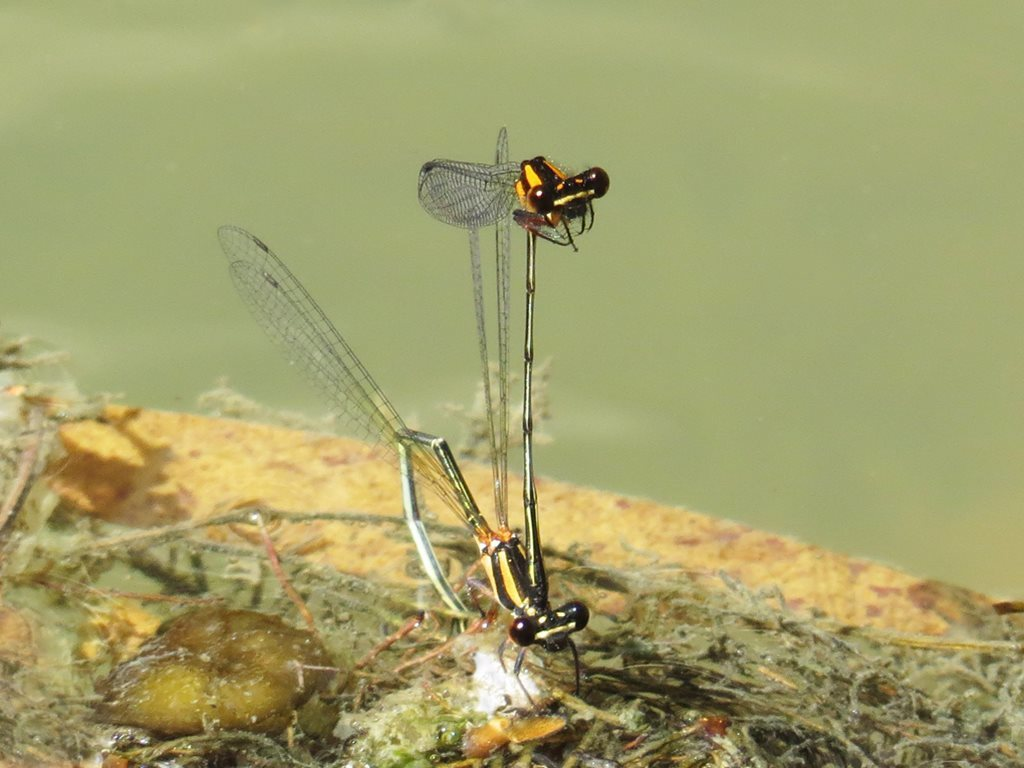
Mating pair. Male holds the female while she oviposits.

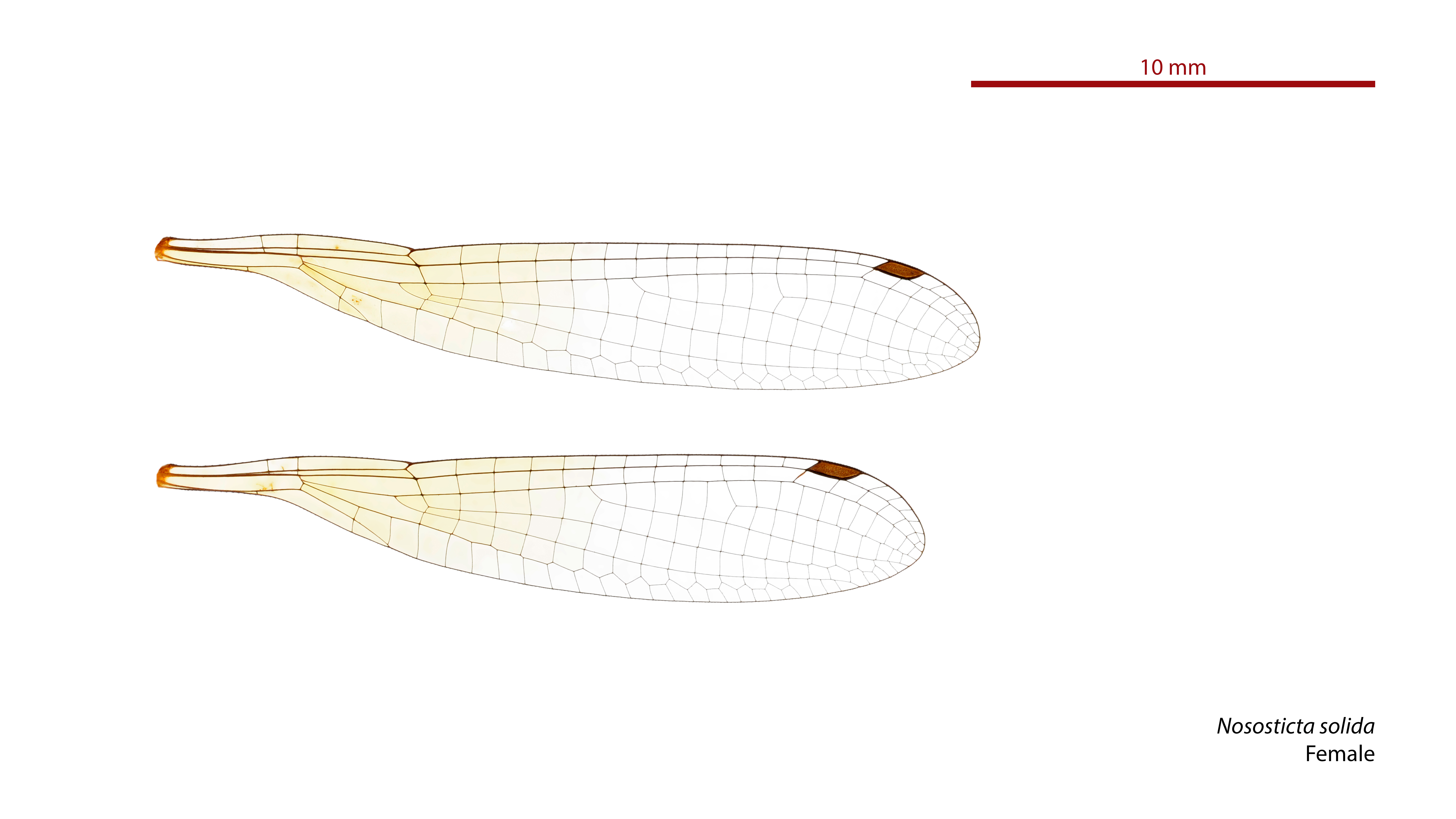
Female wings

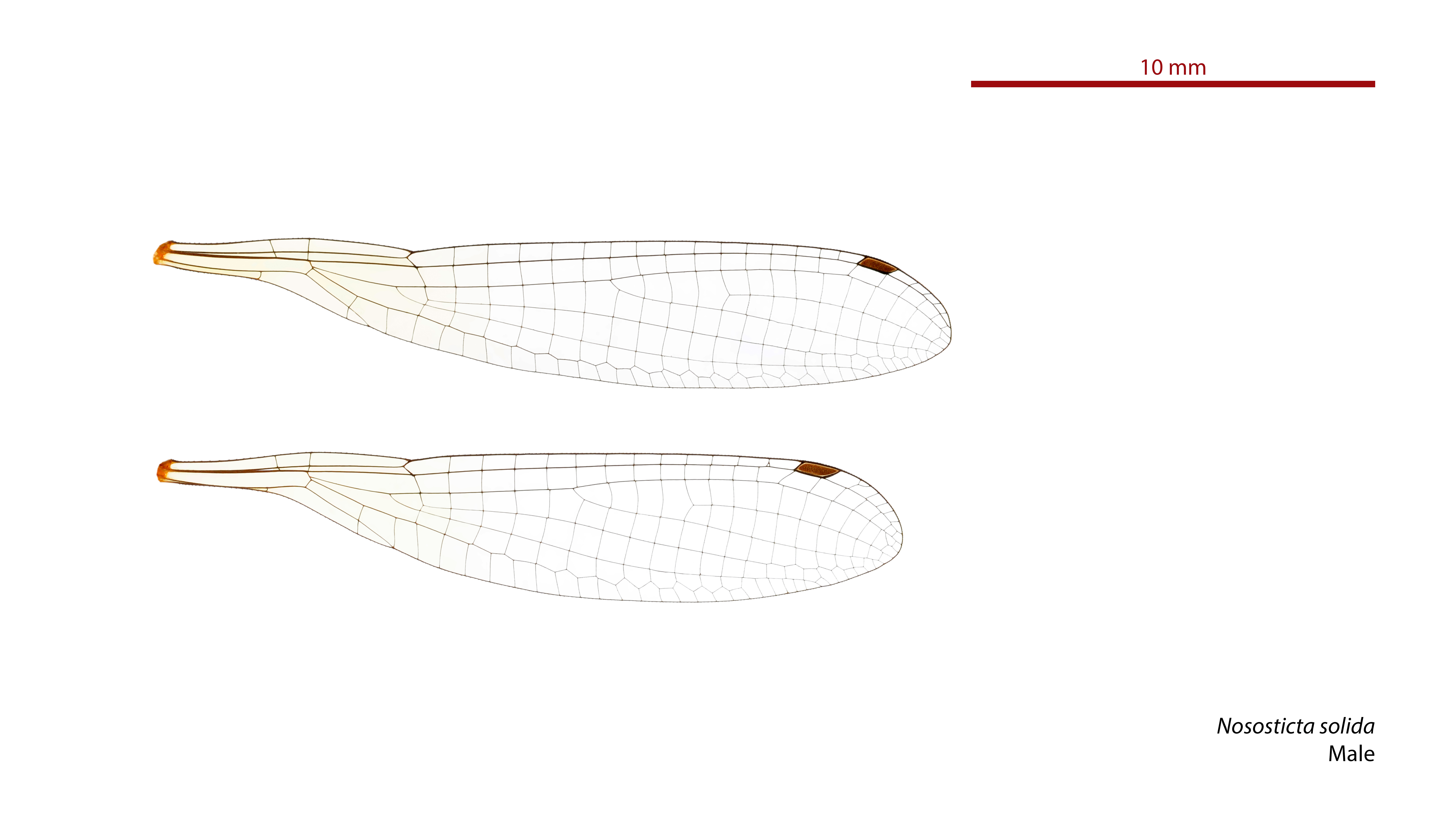
Male wings

== See also ==
- List of Dragonfly species of Australia
- Brisbane Insects
