= Nososticta pilbara =

Pilbara threadtail

Conservation status
- Endangered (IUCN 3.1)

Scientific classification
- Kingdom: Animalia
- Phylum: Arthropoda
- Clade: Pancrustacea
- Class: Insecta
- Order: Odonata
- Suborder: Zygoptera
- Family: Platycnemididae
- Genus: Nososticta
- Species: N. pilbara

Binomial name
- Nososticta pilbara Watson, 1969

Synonyms
- Nososticta solida pilbara Watson, 1969

Species of damselfly

Nososticta pilbara is a species of Australian damselfly in the family Platycnemididae, commonly known as a Pilbara threadtail. It has only been found in the Pilbara region of Western Australia, where it inhabits streams and pools.

Nososticta pilbara is a small, slender damselfly, black in colour with orange markings.

== Etymology ==
The genus name Nososticta combines the Greek νόσος (nosos, "disease") with στικτός (stiktos, "spotted" or "marked"). The suffix -sticta is commonly used in names of taxa related to Protoneura and the subfamily Isostictinae.

The species name pilbara is named for the Pilbara region of Western Australia, where the original specimens of this species were collected.

== Gallery ==
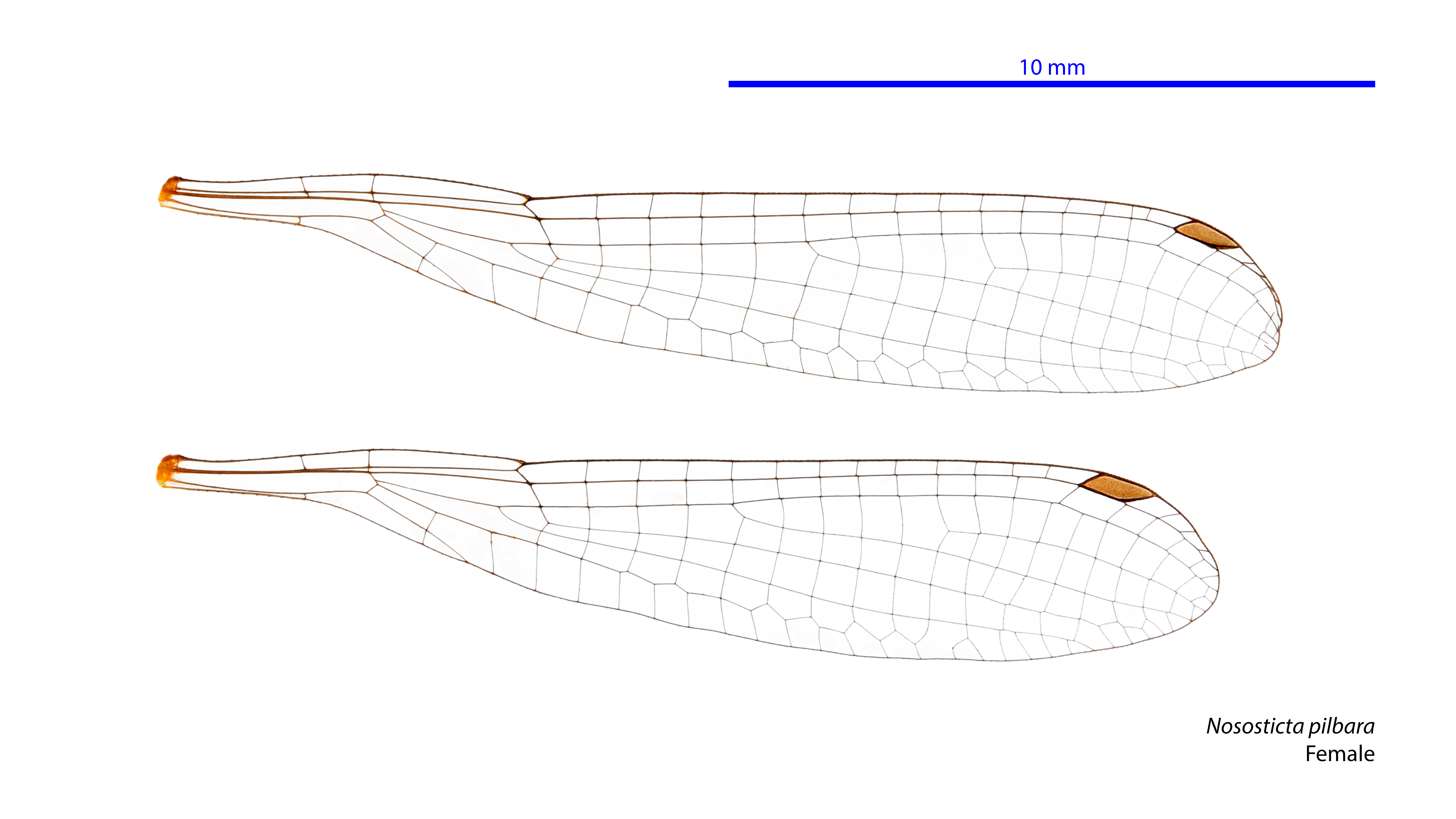
Female wings

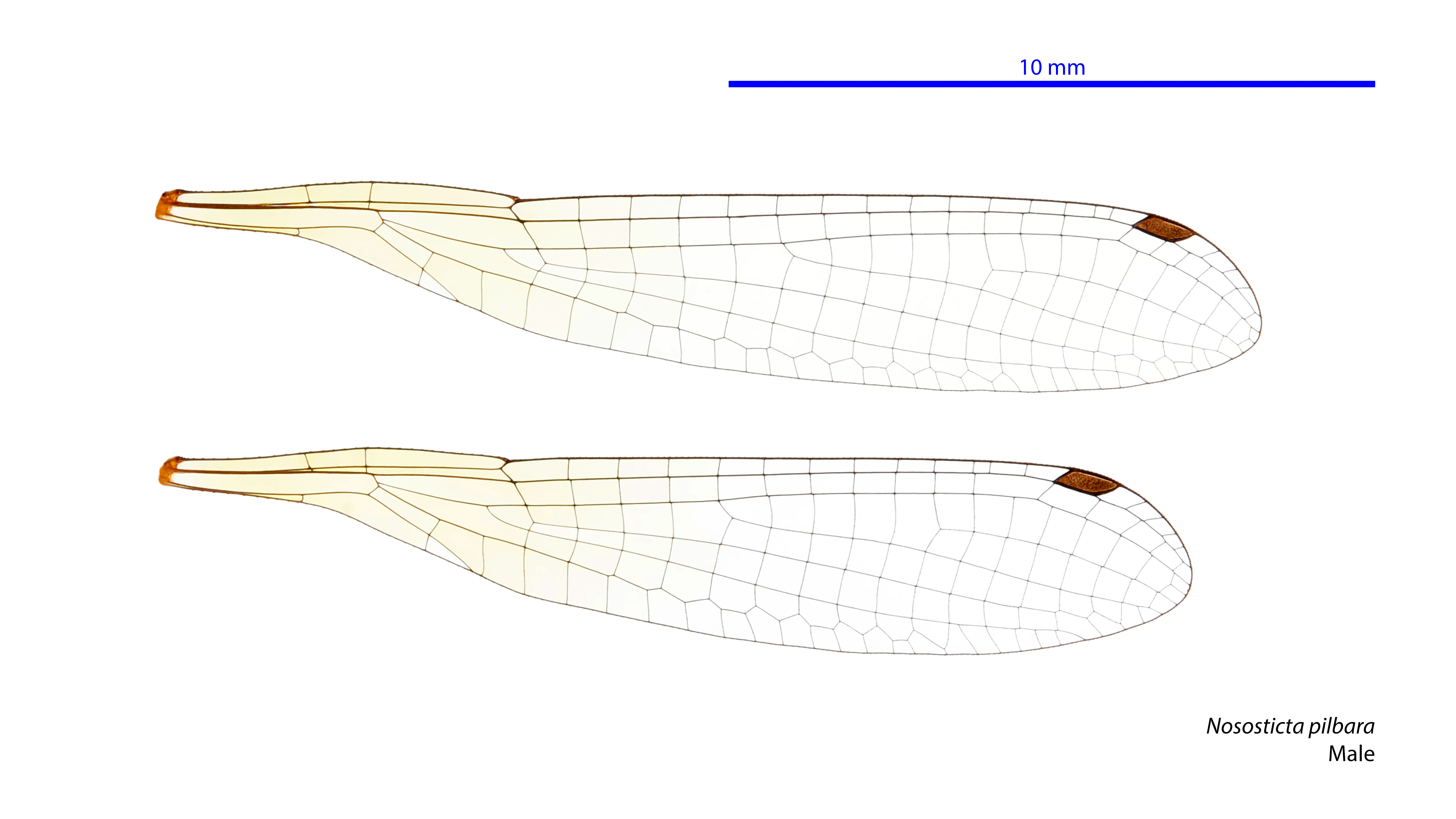
Male wings

== See also ==
- List of Odonata species of Australia
