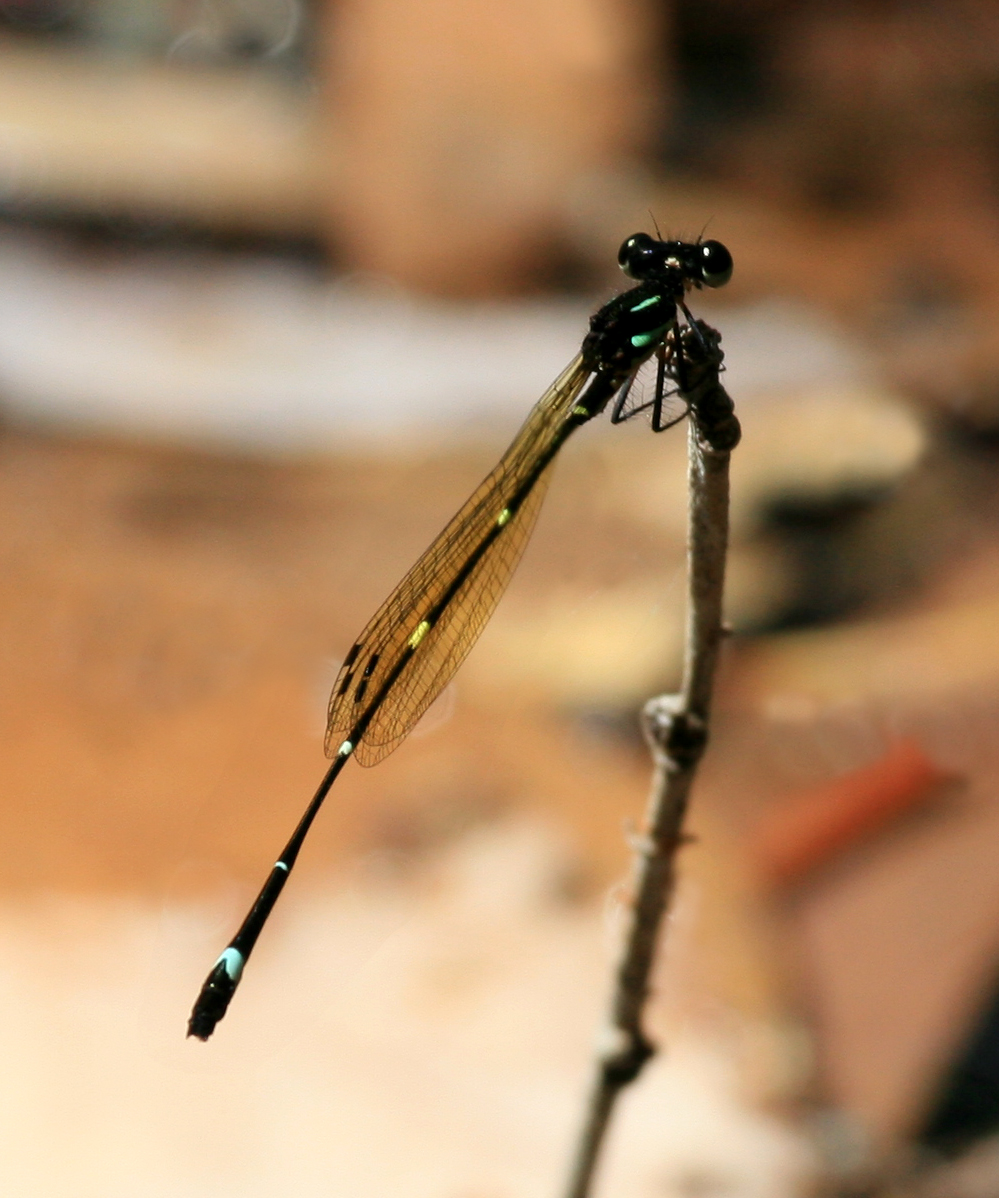
- Fivespot threadtail, Queensland

Conservation status
- Least Concern (IUCN 3.1)

Scientific classification
- Kingdom: Animalia
- Phylum: Arthropoda
- Clade: Pancrustacea
- Class: Insecta
- Order: Odonata
- Suborder: Zygoptera
- Family: Platycnemididae
- Genus: Nososticta
- Species: N. solitaria

Binomial name
- Nososticta solitaria (Tillyard, 1906)

Synonyms
- Alloneura solitarius Tillyard, 1906

= Nososticta solitaria =

Fivespot threadtail

Species of damselfly

Nososticta solitaria is an Australian species of damselfly in the family Platycnemididae, commonly known as the fivespot threadtail. It is found only in north-eastern Australia.

Its usual habitat is near rivers, streams and pools. The adult is a medium-sized damselfly with a length of 35 to 40mm, and wingspan similar to its length. The thorax is black with two pale green stripes. The abdomen is dark with five prominent pale or green bands, the largest being on segments 5 and 8. The wings of the male have a yellowish tint, which may also be seen on the female. In Australia, the distribution is in suitable habitat in the north-eastern part of the continent from the tip of Cape York Peninsula to the southern Queensland border. The taxon has not been assessed in the IUCN Red List.

== Etymology ==
The genus name Nososticta combines the Greek νόσος (nosos, "disease") with στικτός (stiktos, "spotted" or "marked"). The suffix -sticta is commonly used in names of taxa related to Protoneura and the subfamily Isostictinae.

The species name solitaria is derived from the Latin solitarius ("alone" or "solitary"), referring to the habit of the original specimens of occurring alone.

== Gallery ==
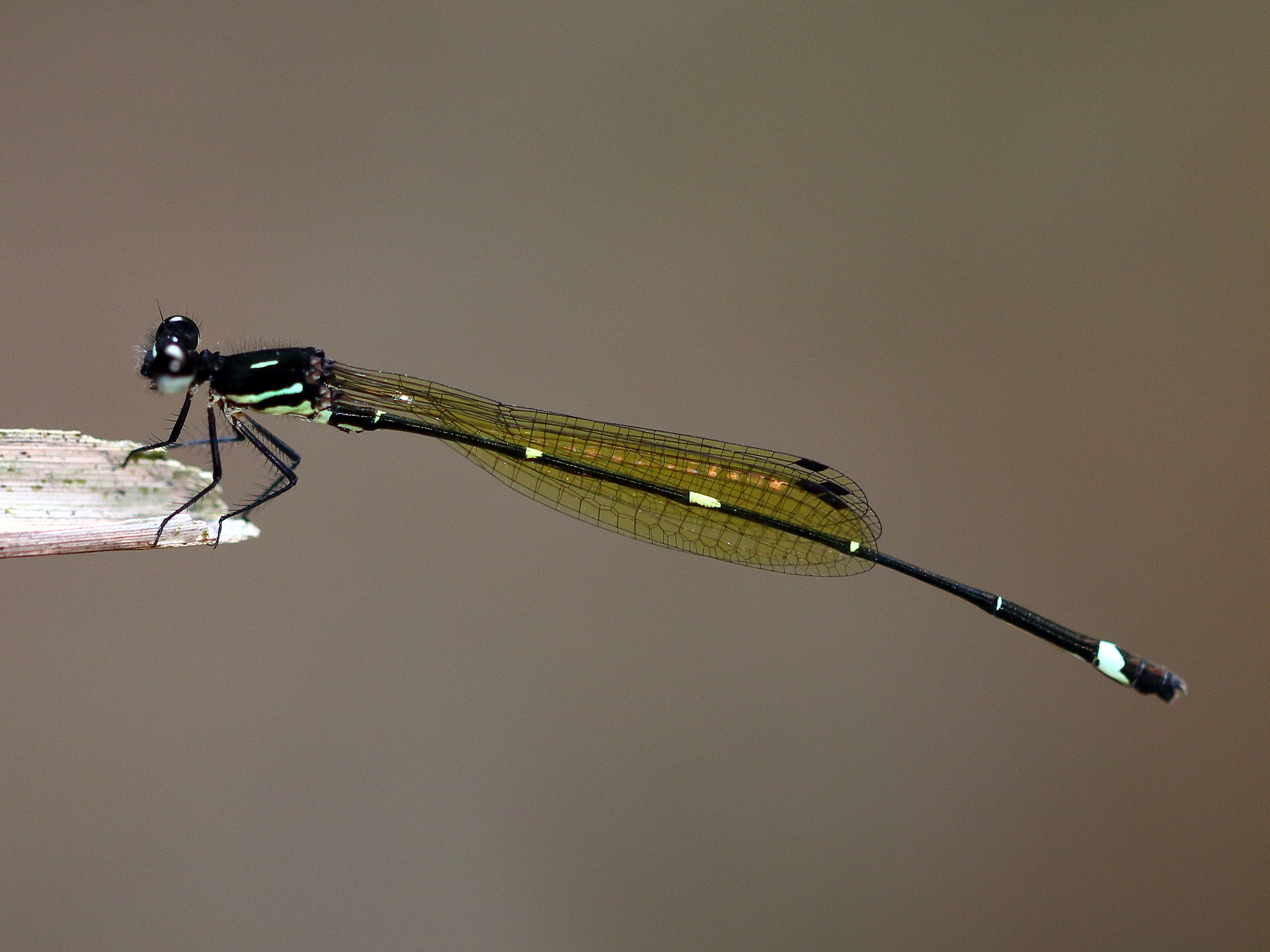
Male in Cairns

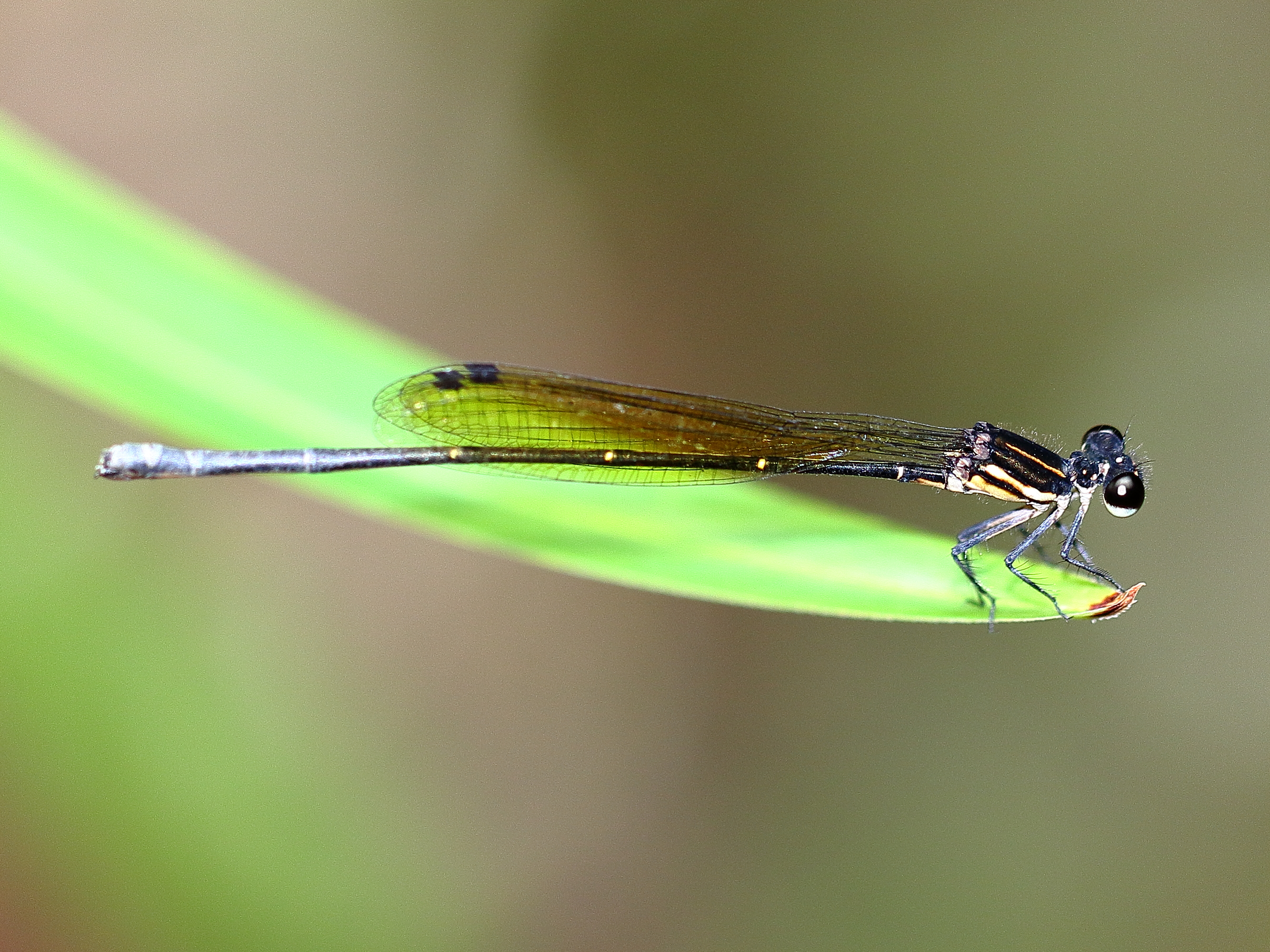
Female in Cairns

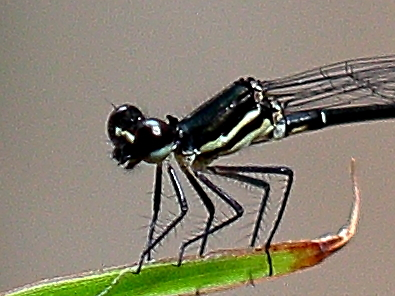
Face of female

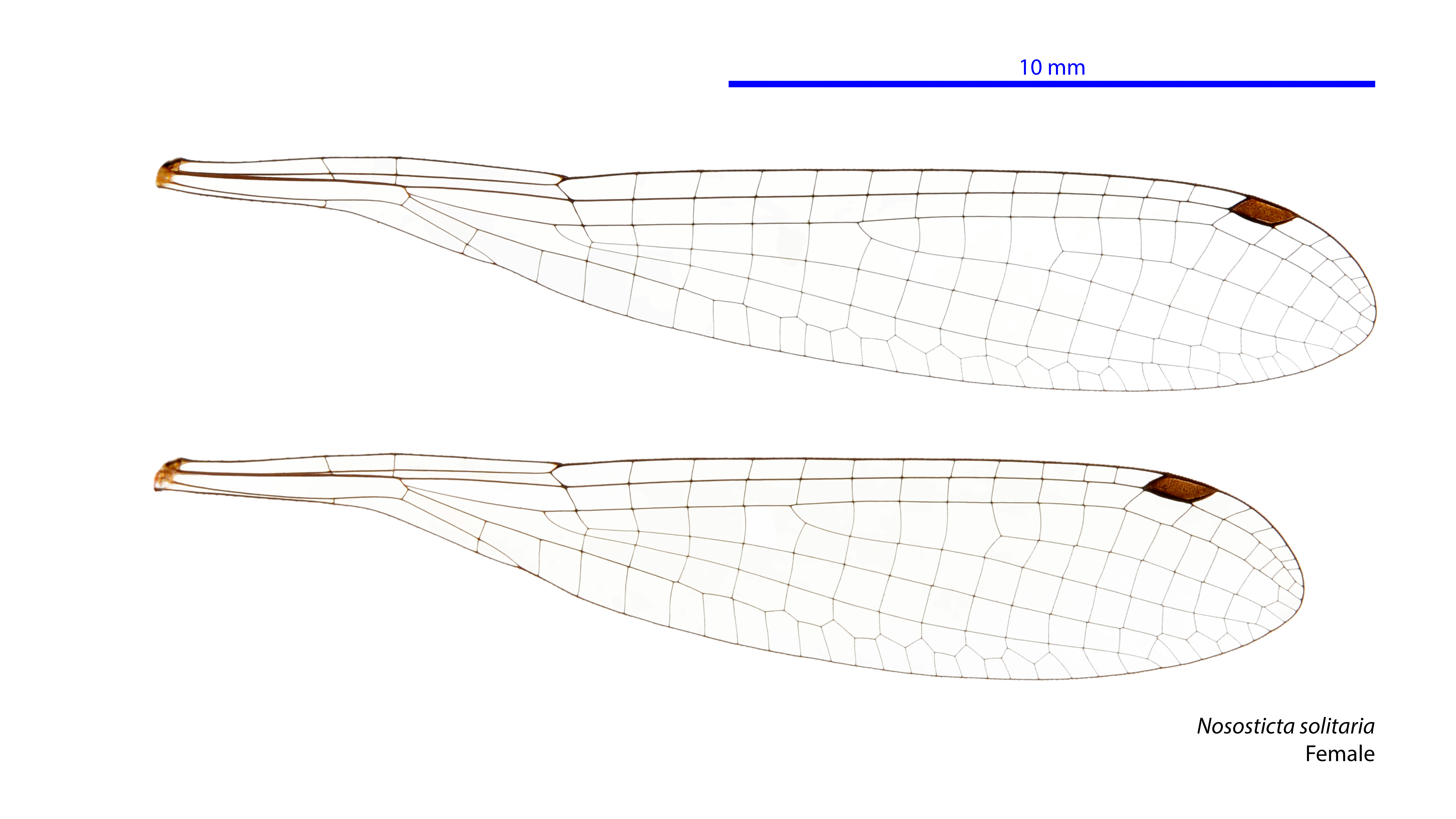
Female wings

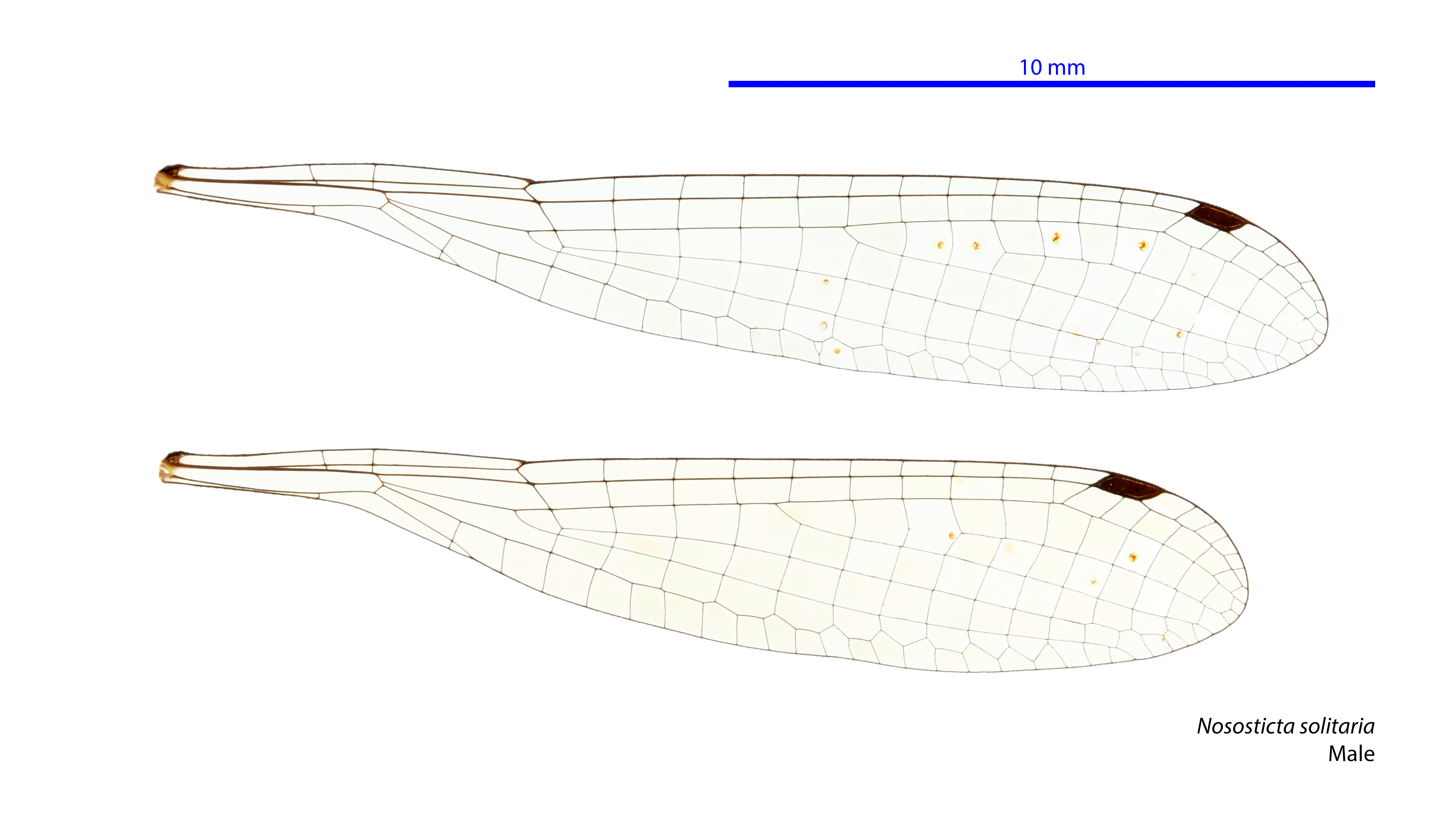
Male wings

== See also ==
- List of Odonata species of Australia
