= Dweep (disambiguation) =

Dweep is a puzzle game published in 1999.

Dweep may also refer to:

== Islands ==
=== India ===
- Lakshadweep, a group of islands in the Laccadive Sea, off the southwestern coast of India
- Jambudwip, in the Bay of Bengal
- Jawahar Dweep or Butcher Island, off the coast of Mumbai
- Kuruvadweep, a river delta on the Kabini River in Kerala

=== Elsewhere ===
- Chera Dweep, an extension of St. Martin's Island in the Bay of Bengal, Bangladesh
- Mahal Dweep, an obsolete name for the Maldives

== Other uses ==
- Jambudvipa, the dvipa ("island") of the terrestrial world, as envisioned in the cosmologies of Hinduism, Buddhism, and Jainism
- Dweep Panchayat (Island Panchayat), an Indian administrative division
- Dweepa, 2002 Indian film centering on an island
- Dweepu, a 1977 Indian film

== See also ==
- Div (disambiguation), a related form
- Dive (disambiguation), a related form
- Divi (disambiguation), a related form
- Dvipa, a related form
- Jambudvipa (disambiguation)
