= Diving =

Diving most often refers to:

- Diving (sport), the sport of jumping into deep water
- Underwater diving, human activity underwater for recreational or occupational purposes

Diving or Dive may also refer to:

== Sports ==
- Dive (American football), a type of play in American football
- Diving (association football), a simulation of being fouled
- Diving (ice hockey), embellishing the results of an infraction in an attempt to draw a penalty
- Sport diving (sport), competitive scuba diving using recreational techniques in a swimming pool
- Taking a dive, or match fixing, intentionally losing a match, especially in boxing

== Film and television ==
=== Film ===
- Dive (1929 film), a German silent film
- The Dive (1990 film), a Norwegian action thriller
- Dive! (film), a 2010 documentary film by Jeremy Sefert
- Dive, a 2014 New Zealand short film written and directed by Matthew J. Saville
- The Dive (2018 film), an Israeli film
- Dive (2023 film), a Mexican sports drama film
- The Dive (2023 film), a German/Maltese film

=== TV ===
- Dive (TV series), a 2010 British drama
- "The Dive" (Hap and Leonard), a 2016 television episode

== Music ==
=== Bands ===
- Dive (Belgian band), an electronic dance music project with an eponymous 1990 album
- Dive (Swedish band), a 1990s duo with an eponymous 1994 album
- DIIV, originally Dive, an American rock band

=== Albums ===
- Dive (Almost Monday album) or the title song, 2024
- Dive (Maaya Sakamoto album) or the title song, 1998
- Dive (Sarah Brightman album) or the title song, 1993
- Dive (Twice album) or the title song, 2024
- Dive (Tycho album) or the title song, 2011
- Dive, by Burning Heads, 1994
- Dive, by I Am the Avalanche, 2020
- Dive, an EP by Milk & Bone, 2019

=== Songs ===
- "Dive" (Ed Sheeran song), 2017
- "Dive" (Nirvana song), 1992
- "Dive" (Olivia Dean song), 2023
- "Dive" (Steven Curtis Chapman song), 1999
- "Dive" (Usher song), 2012
- "Dive", by Beach House from 7, 2018
- "Dive", by BeForU, 2000
- "Dive", by Birds of Tokyo from Human Design, 2020
- "Dive", by BoyNextDoor from Home, 2026
- "Dive", by Cardiacs from A Little Man and a House and the Whole World Window, 1988
- "Dive", by DC Talk from Supernatural, 1998
- "Dive", by the Dead Stars on Hollywood, 2005
- "Dive", by Holly Humberstone from Work in Progress, 2024
- "Dive", by iKon from I Decide, 2020
- "Dive", by Jinyoung, 2021
- "Dive", by Kid Cudi from Man on the Moon III: The Chosen, 2020
- "Dive", by Saint Etienne from Home Counties, 2017
- "Diving" (song), by Bridgit Mendler, 2017
- "Diving", by 4 Strings, 2002

== Places ==
- Dive (river), a river in France, tributary of the Thouet
- Dive du Sud, a river in France, tributary of the Clain
- Dive (Vienne), a river in France, tributary of the Vienne
- Dive, Thane, a village in Bhiwandi, Thane District, Maharashtra, India
- Lake Dive, a lake in Egmont National Park, New Zealand

== Other uses ==
- Dive (aviation), a rapid descent by an aircraft ( also see dive bombing )
- Dive: The Medes Islands Secret, a 2010 video game
- Dive!!, a 2008 series of novels by Eto Mori
- Dive! (restaurant), a defunct restaurant in Los Angeles, California, US
- Dive bar, a type of bar or pub
- Daeva or Dive, a demon in Persian mythology

== People ==
- Bradshaw Dive (1865–1946), New Zealand politician
- Caroline Dive (born 1962), British cancer pharmacologist
- Mollie Dive (1913–1997), Australian cricketer
- Dive Downes (1652–1709), Irish bishop

== See also ==
- Dive Dive, a British rock band
- "Dive! Dive! Dive!", a 1990 song by Bruce Dickinson
- Diver (disambiguation)
- Dives (disambiguation)
- Divi (disambiguation)
