= Jamu (disambiguation) =

Jamu is traditional medicine in Indonesia.

Jamu or JAMU may also refer to:

- Jamu, Iran, a village in Kohgiluyeh and Boyer-Ahmad Province, Iran
- Jamu Mare, rural municipality and village in Timiș County, Banat, Romania
- Jamu Mic or Mali Žam, village in Vršac municipality, South Banat District, Vojvodina province, Serbia
- Janáček Academy of Music and Performing Arts, Czech Republic (abbreviation of Czech name)

== See also ==
- Jammu (disambiguation)
  - Jammu, region of India
- Jambu (disambiguation)
- Jamo (disambiguation)
