= Bakkhali =

- Village
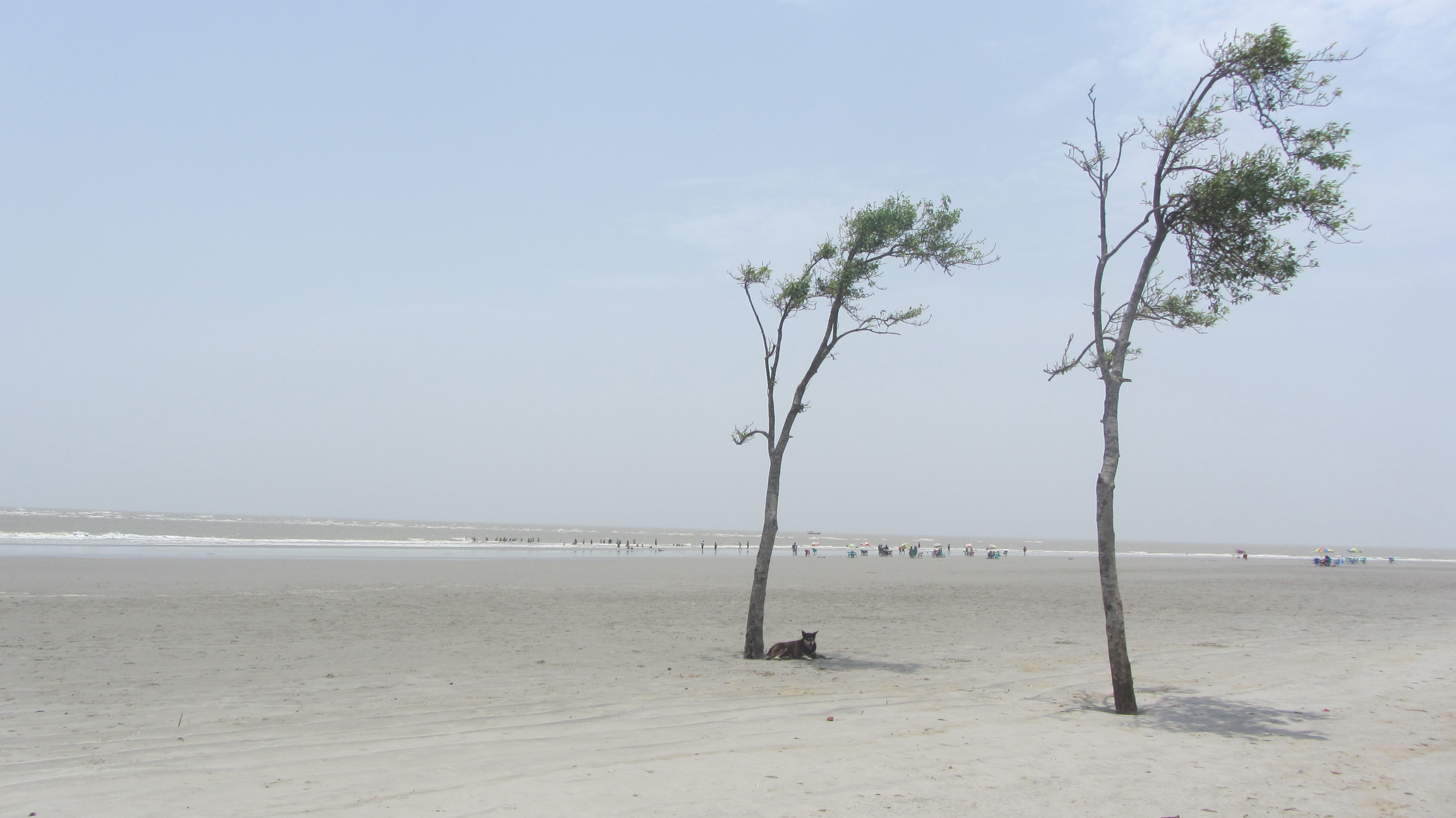
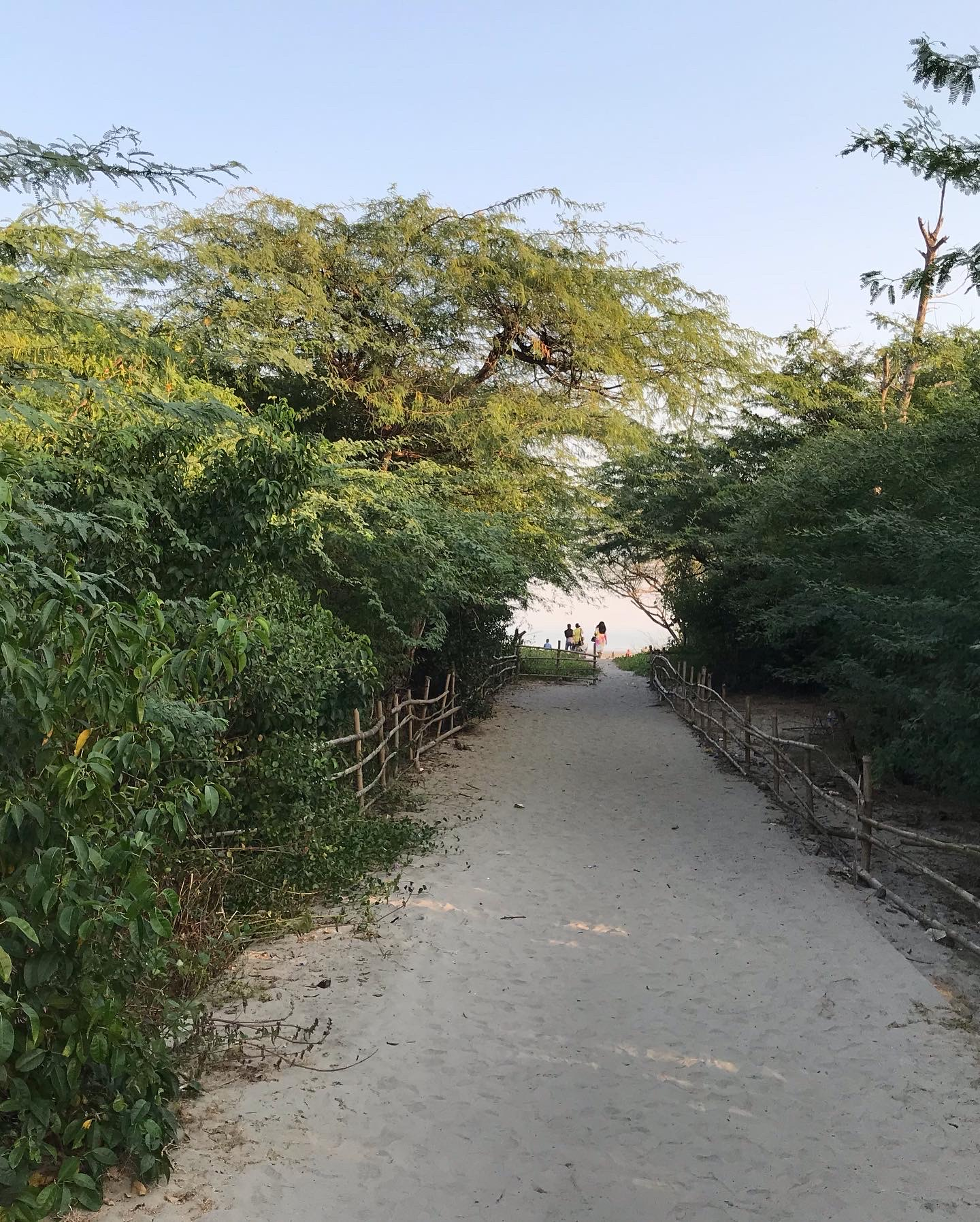
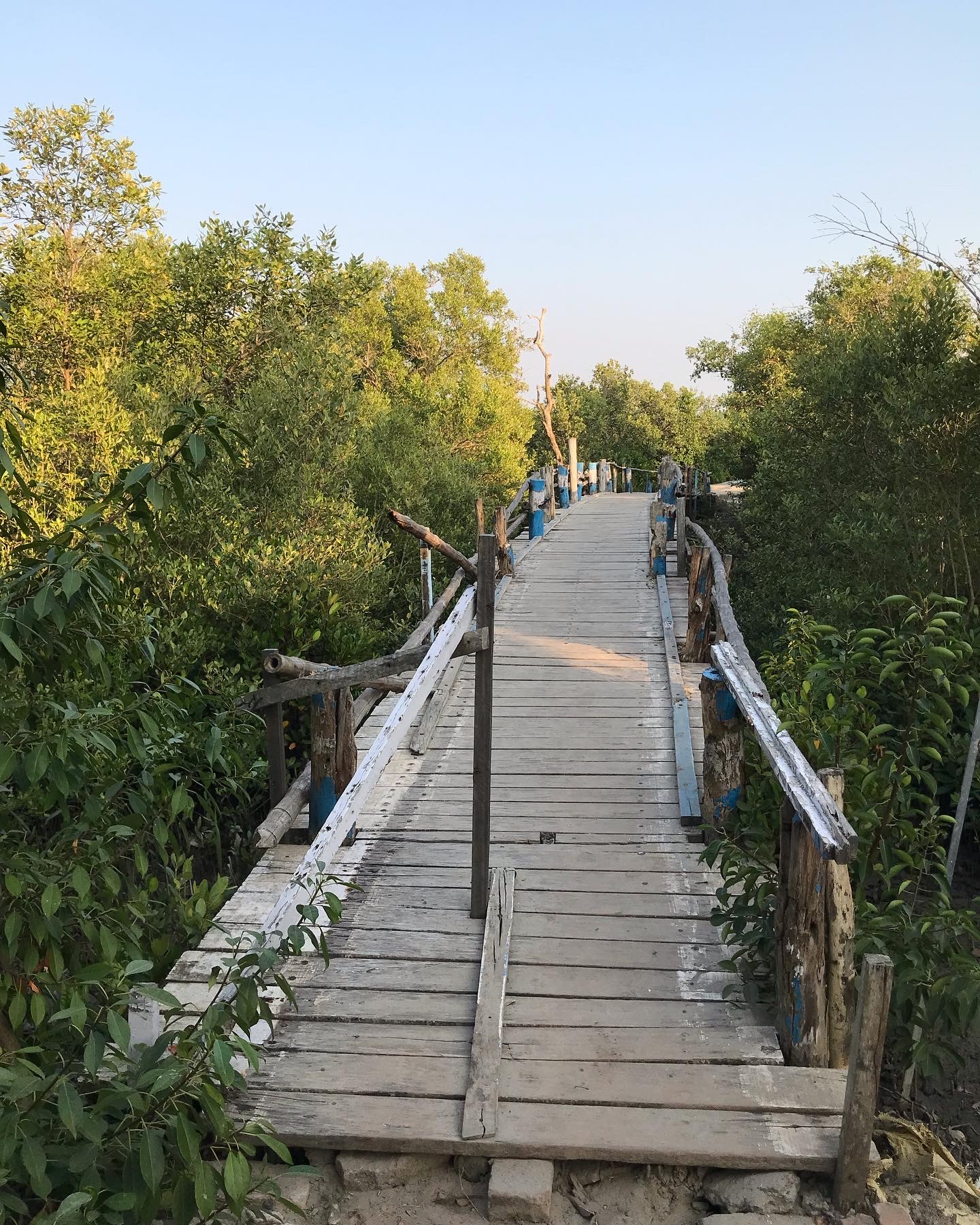
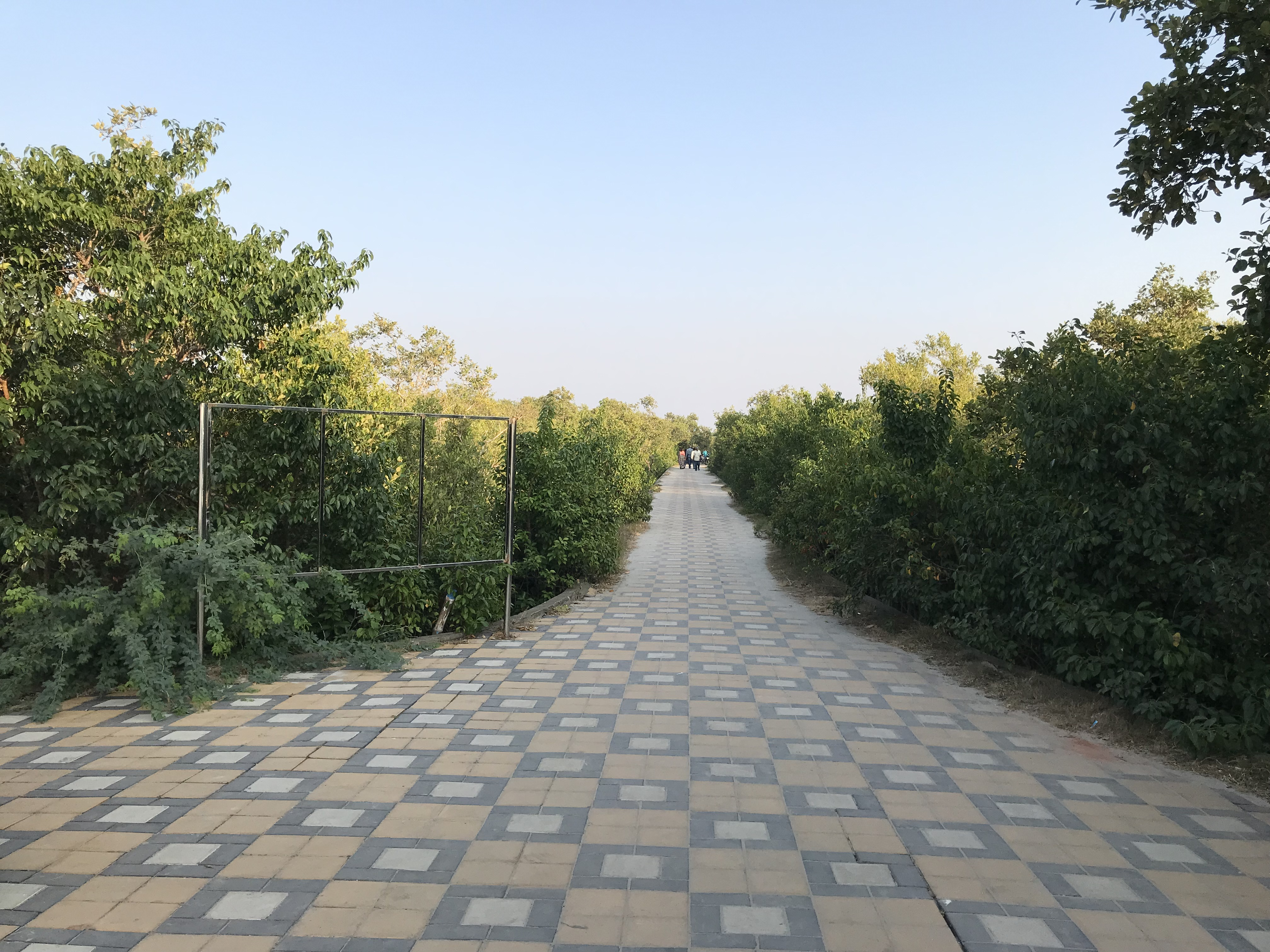
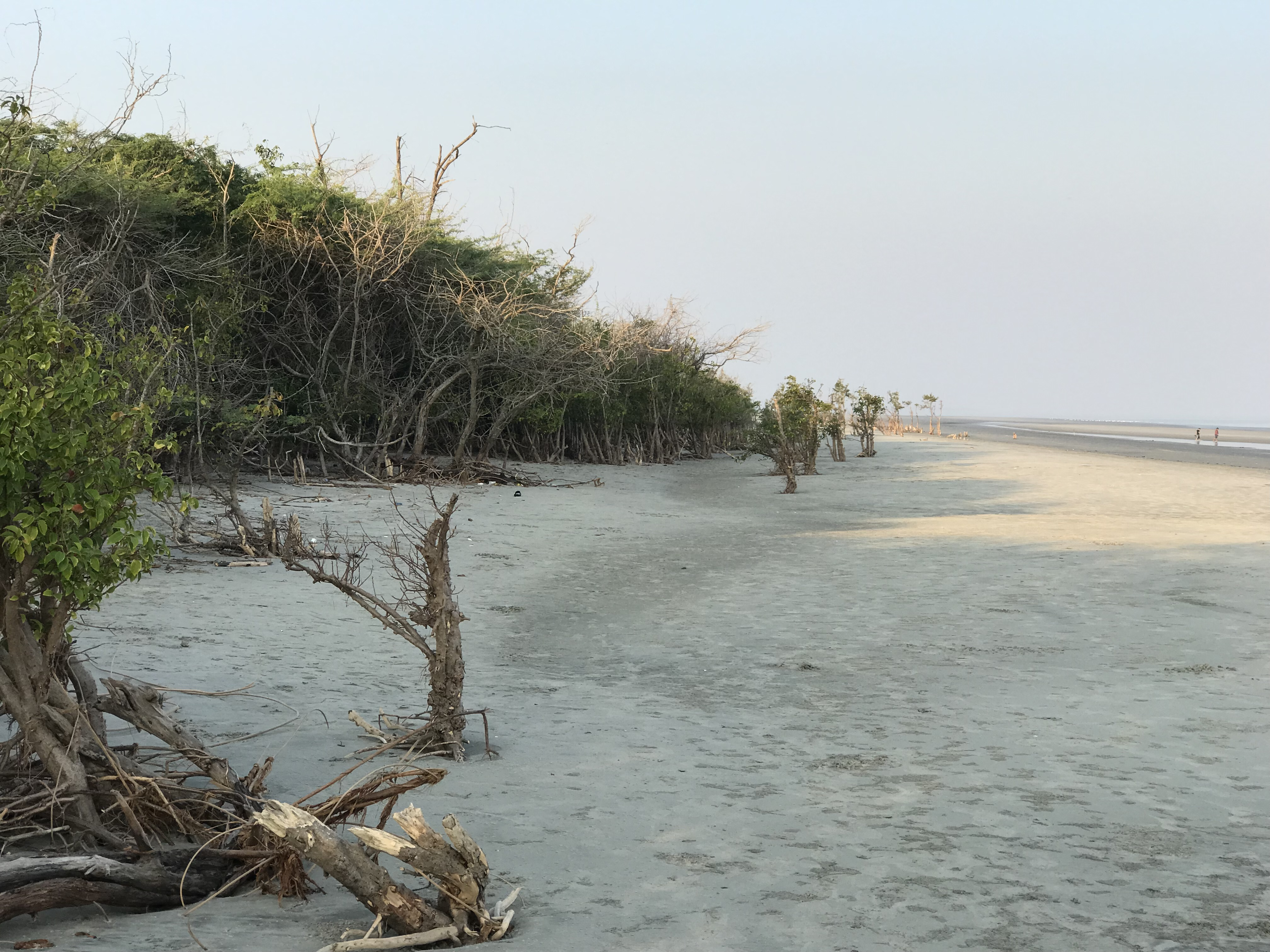
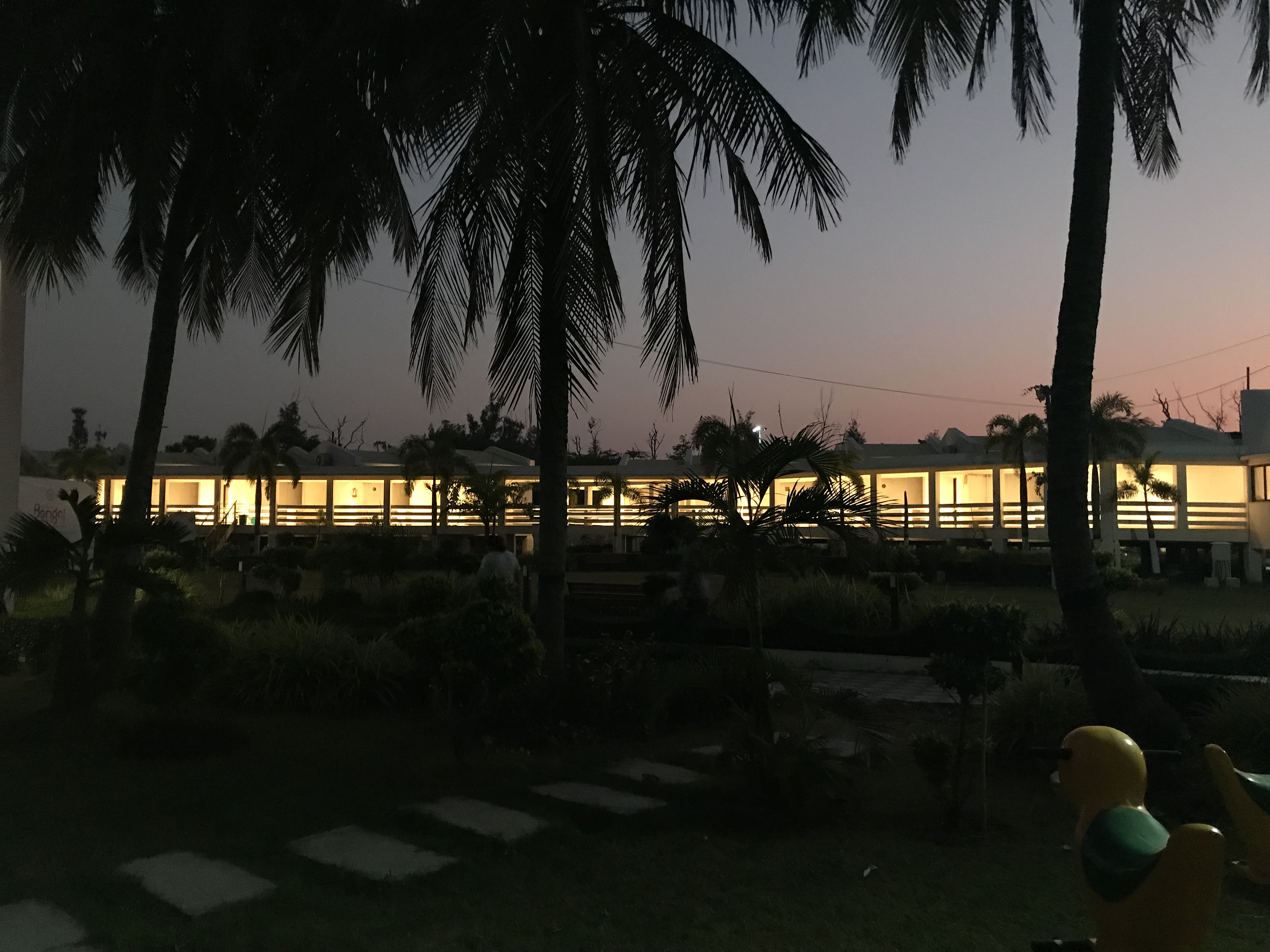
- From top: Bakkhali sea beach, Henry's Island beach, Wooden Bridge, Henry's island, Mangrove reserve forest, Resort in Bakkhali

- Location in West Bengal Location in India
- Coordinates: 21.5631°N 88.2595°E
- Country: India
- State: West Bengal
- District: South 24 Parganas
- CD Block: Namkhana
- Elevation: 4 m (13 ft)

Languages
  - Official: Bengali
  - Additional official: English
- Time zone: UTC+5:30 (IST)
- PIN: 743339
- Telephone code: +91 3210
- Vehicle registration: WB-19 to WB-22, WB-95 to WB-99
- Lok Sabha constituency: Mathurapur (SC)
- Vidhan Sabha constituency: Sagar
- Website: www.s24pgs.gov.in

Bakkhali is a village within the jurisdiction of the Namkhana police station in the Namkhana CD block in the Kakdwip subdivision of the South 24 Parganas district in the Indian state of West Bengal.

== History ==
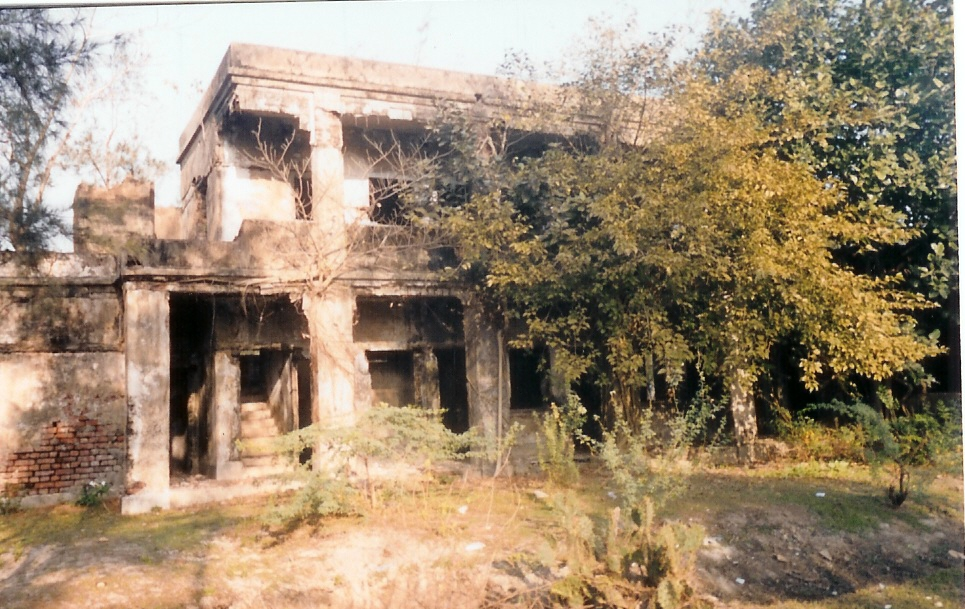
Remains of the house of Sir Andrew Fraser, Lieutenant Governor of Bengal (1903–1908) (1903–1908), at Frasergunj

Sir Andrew Fraser, Lieutenant Governor of Bengal (1903–1908) in the early twentieth century, is credited with "discovery" of the place. In recognition of his efforts, a part of the town is named Fraserganj. There is a dilapidated house near the beach, which according to the locals was the one in which Fraser used to stay.

== Geography ==
Places in Kakdwip subdivision (Kakdwip, Sagar, Namkhana, Patharpratima CD blocks) in South 24 Parganas district
R: rural/ urban centre
Places linked with coastal activity are marked in blue
Owing to space constraints in the small map, the actual locations in a larger map may vary slightly

=== Area overview ===
Kakdwip subdivision has full rural population. The entire district is situated in the Ganges Delta. The southern part of the delta has numerous channels and islands such as Henry Island, Sagar Island, Frederick Island and Fraserganj Island. The subdivision is a part of the Sundarbans settlements. A comparatively recent country-wide development is the guarding of the coastal areas by special coastal forces. The area attracts large number of tourists – Gangasagar and Fraserganj-Bakkhali are worth mentioning. Gobardhanpur holds a promise for the future.

Note: The map alongside presents some of the notable locations in the subdivision. All places marked in the map are linked in the larger full screen map.

=== Location ===
Bakkhali is located at 21°33′47″N 88°15′34″E. It has an average elevation of 4 metres (13 ft).

== Activities ==
There is a fishing harbour at Frasergunj run by Benfish, a wing of the state government has a presence nearby.

== Tourism ==
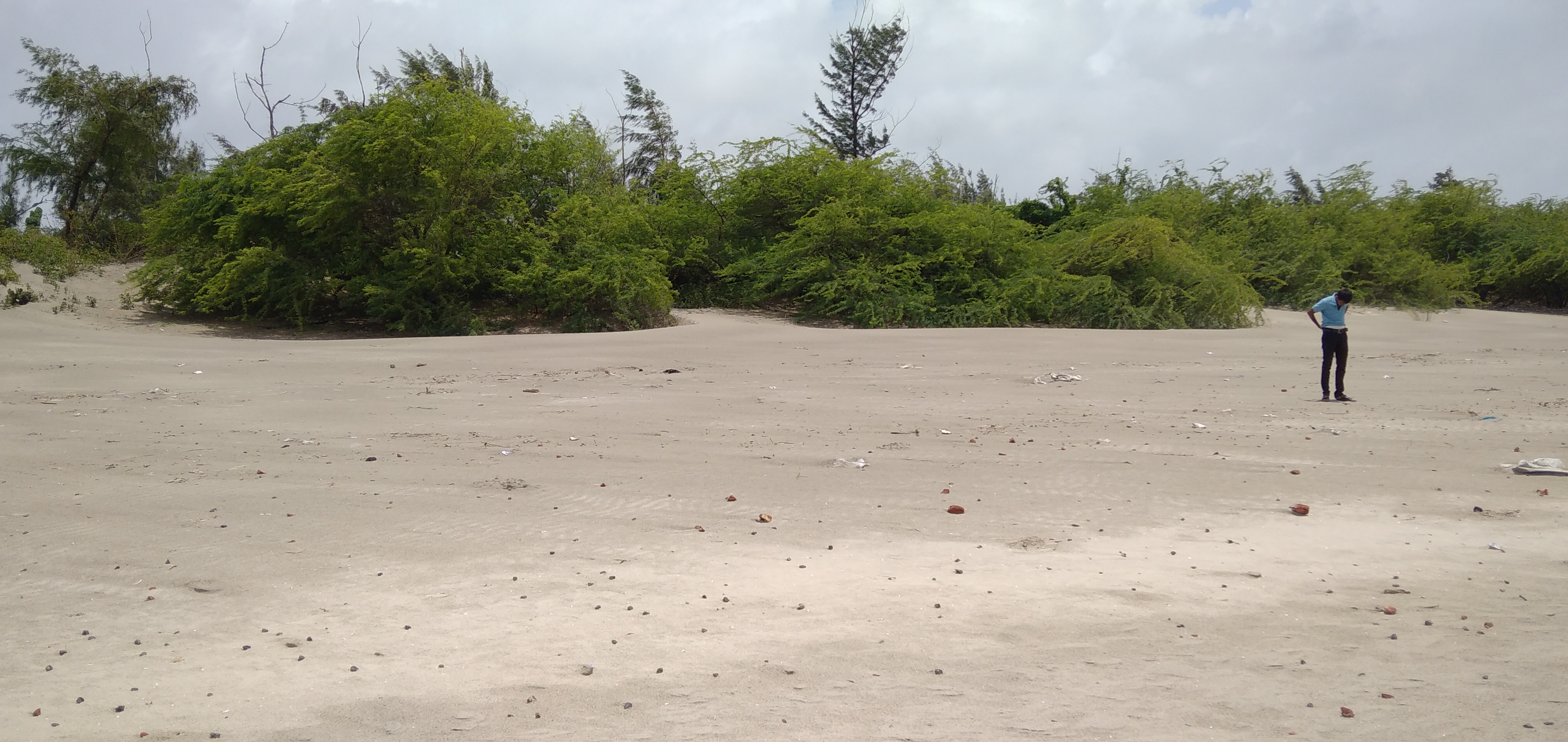
Sea beach in Bakkhali

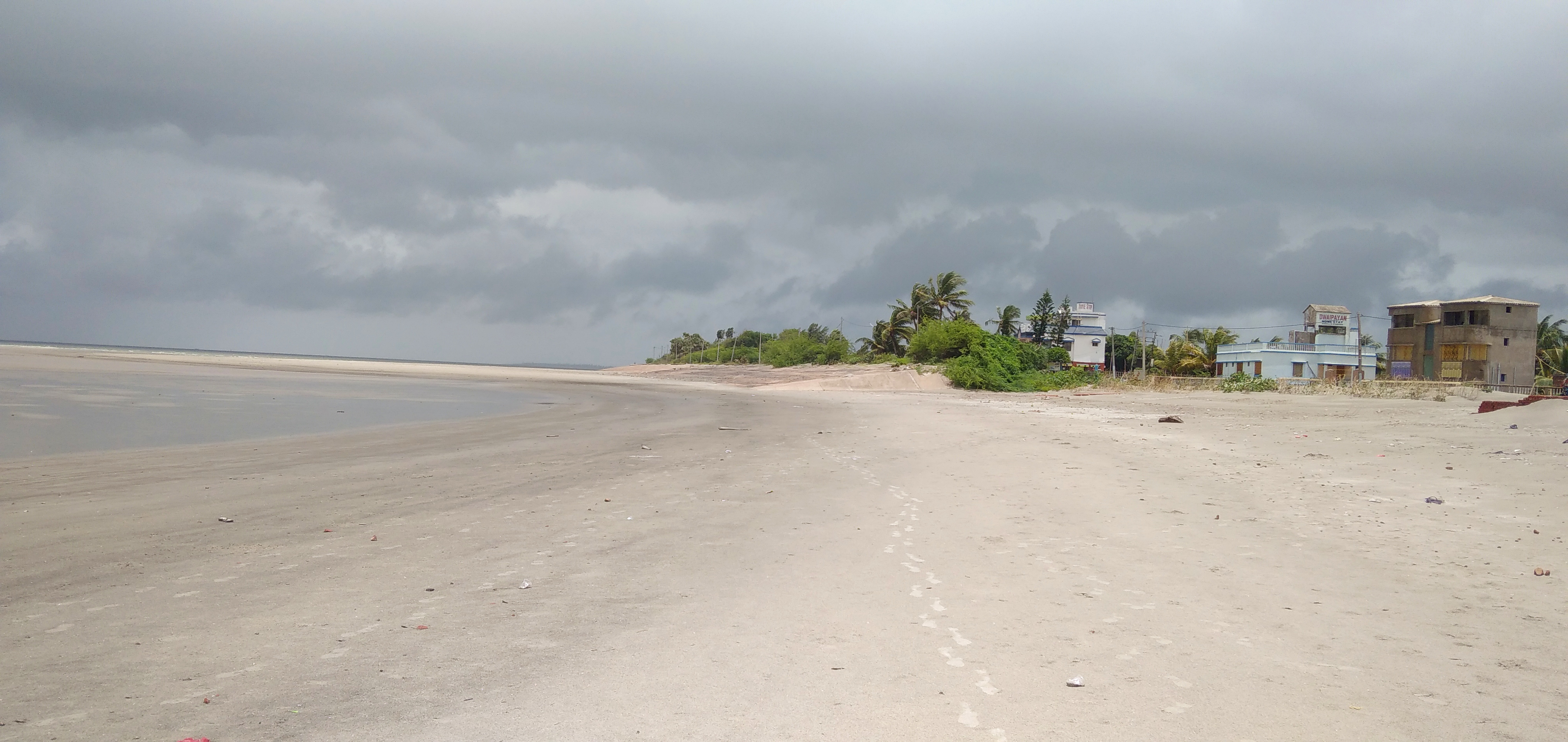
White Sea beach in Bakkhali

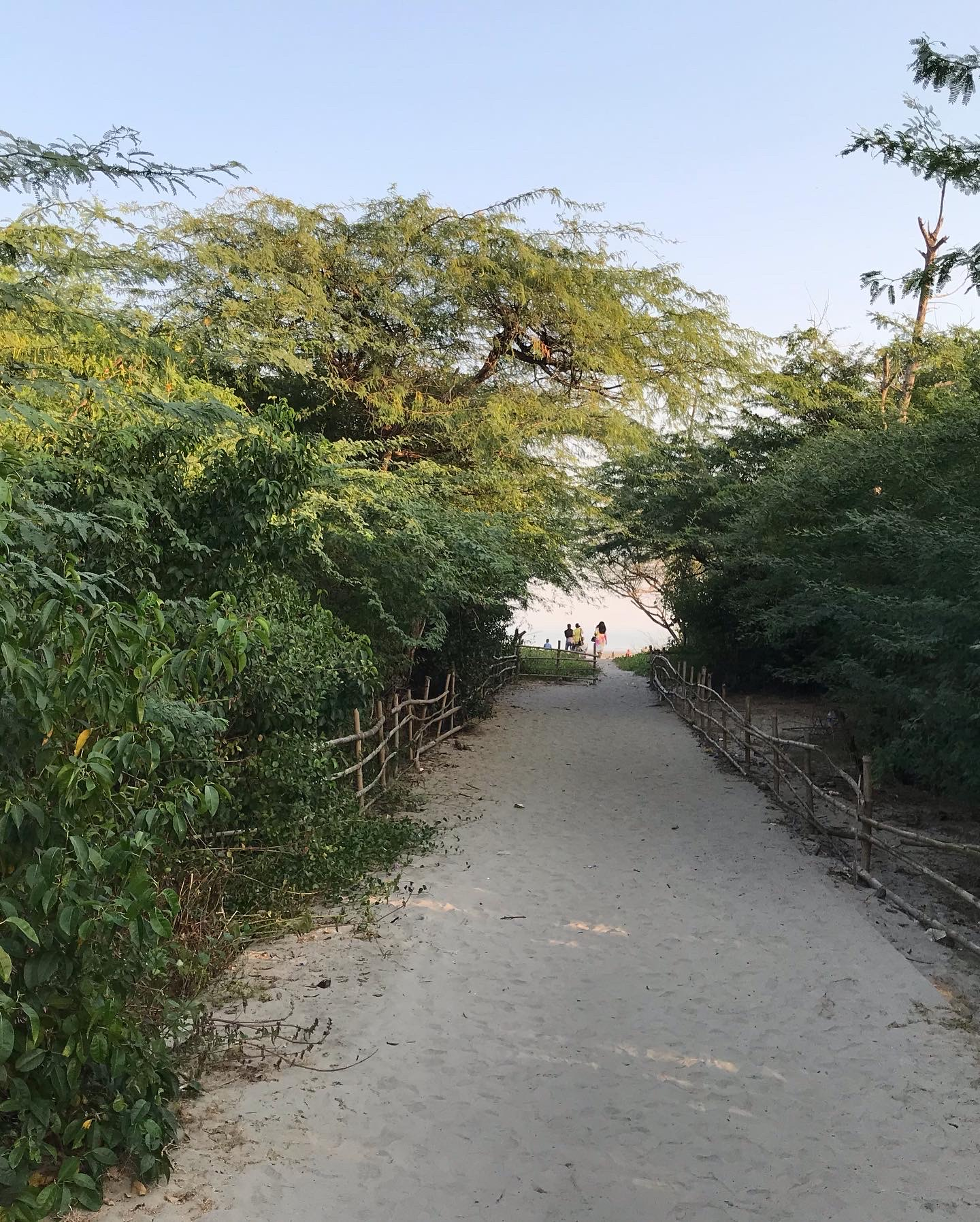
Entrance to White Sand Beach

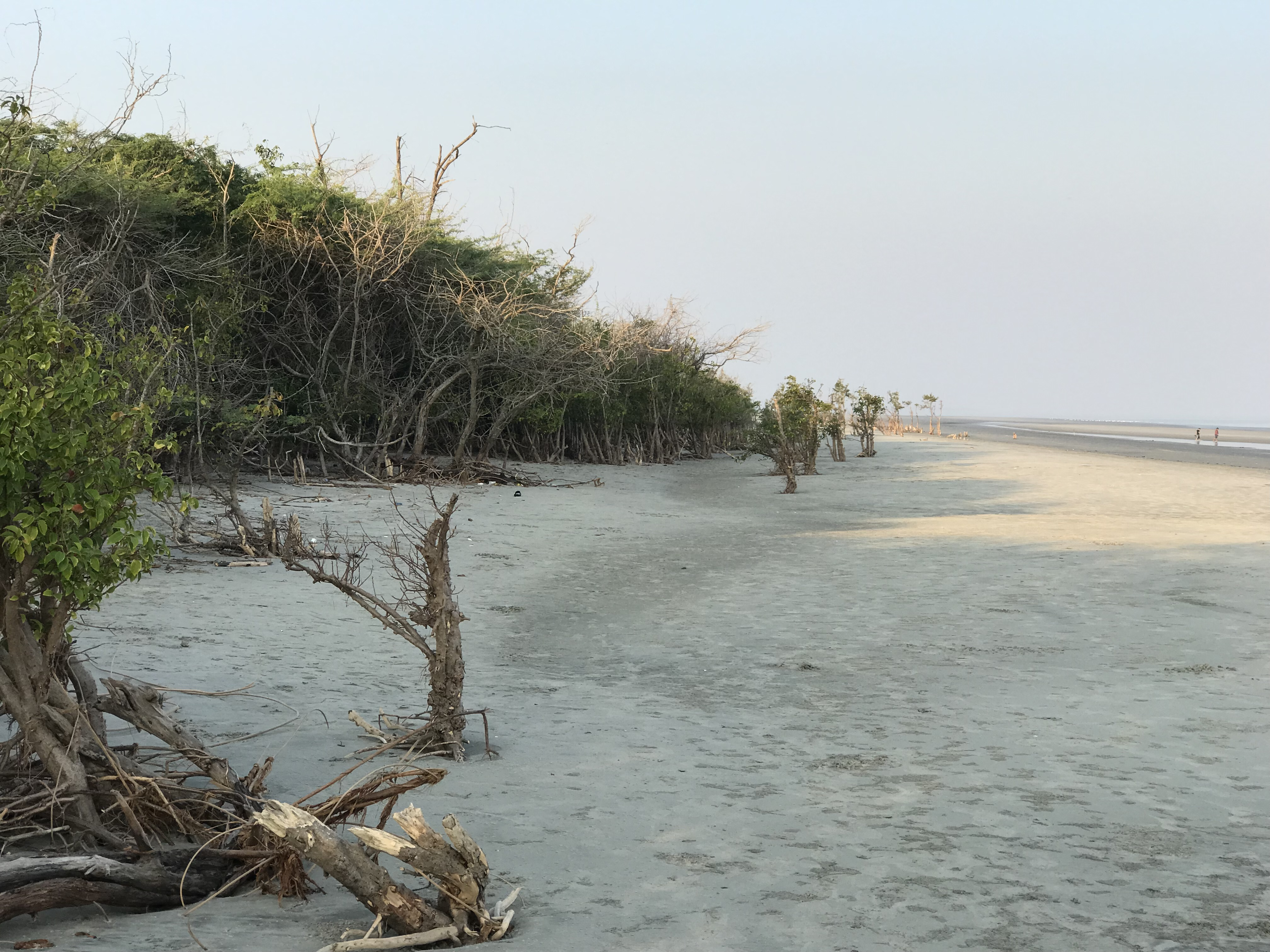
White sand beach in Bakkhali

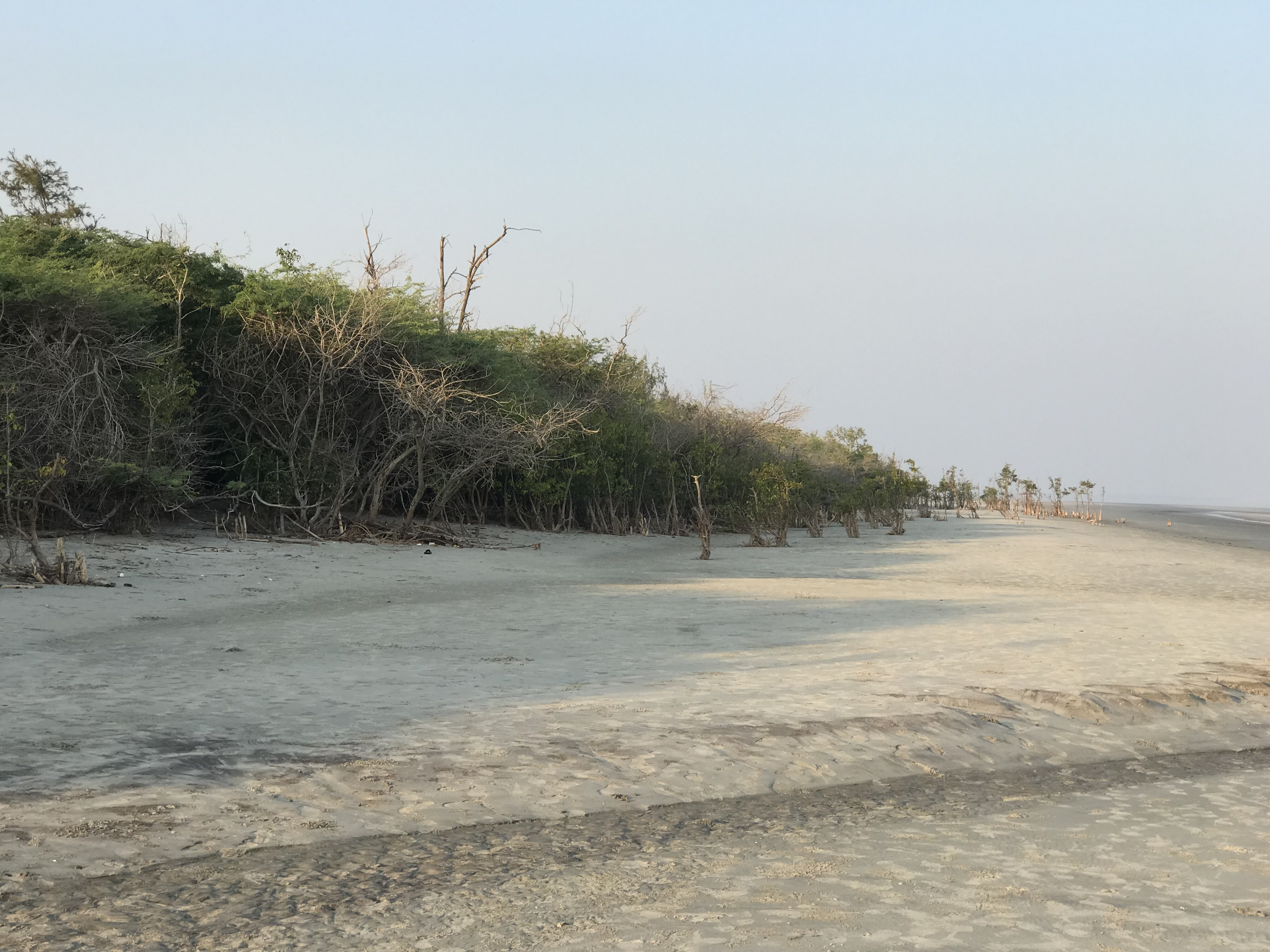
White Sand Beach of Bakkhali

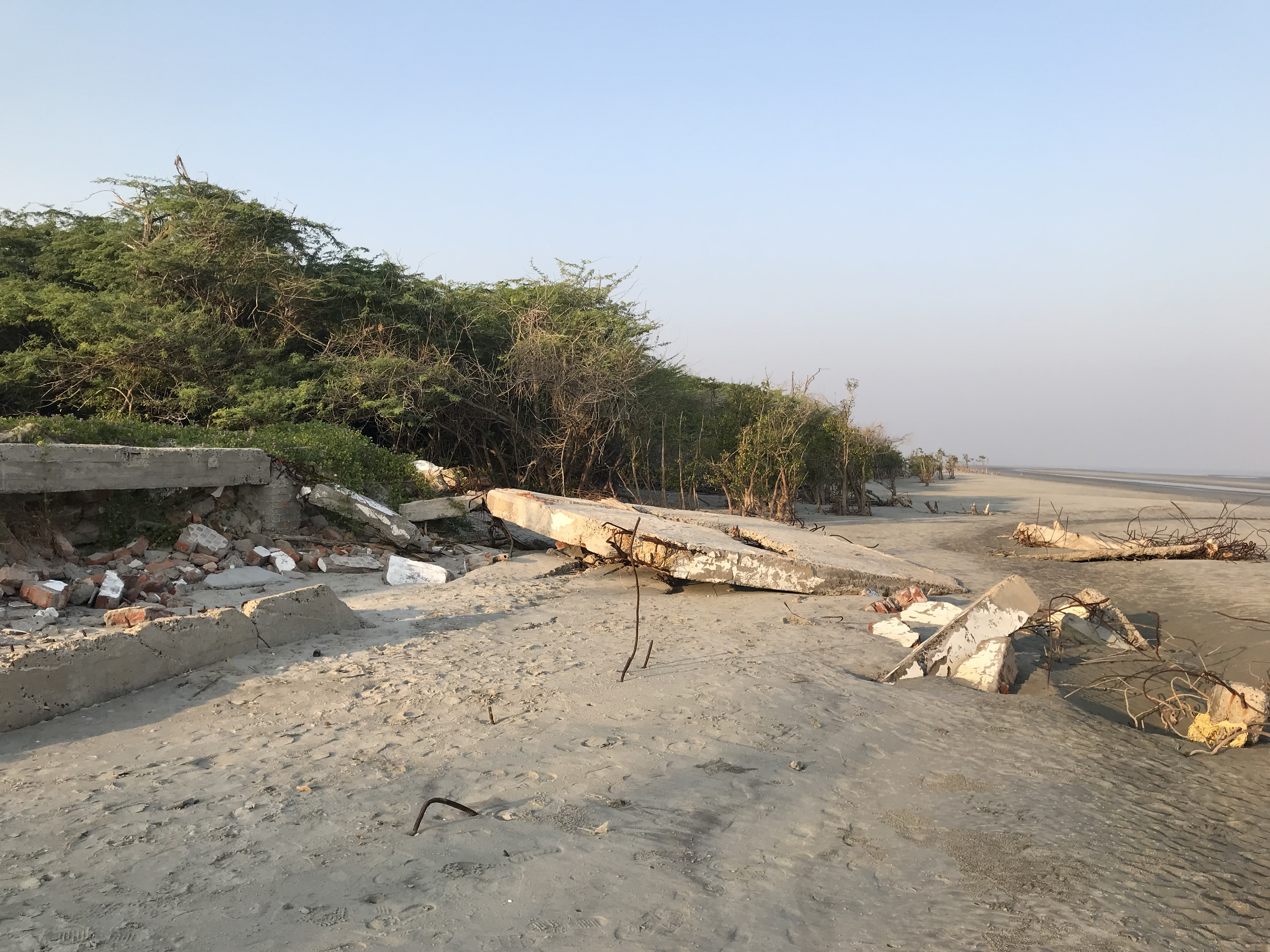
White Sand Beach with wooden log in Bakkhali

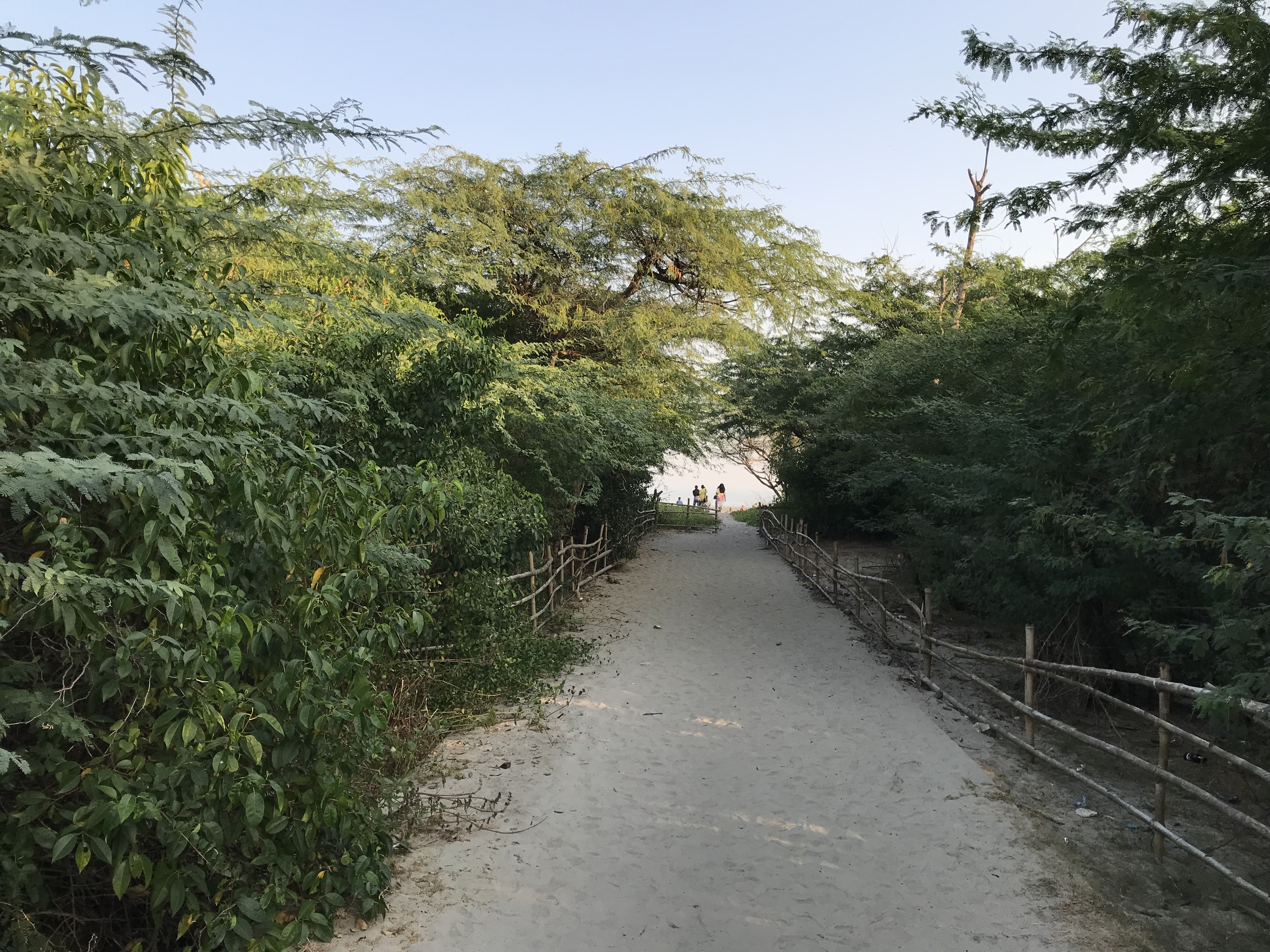
Way to White sand beach bakkhali

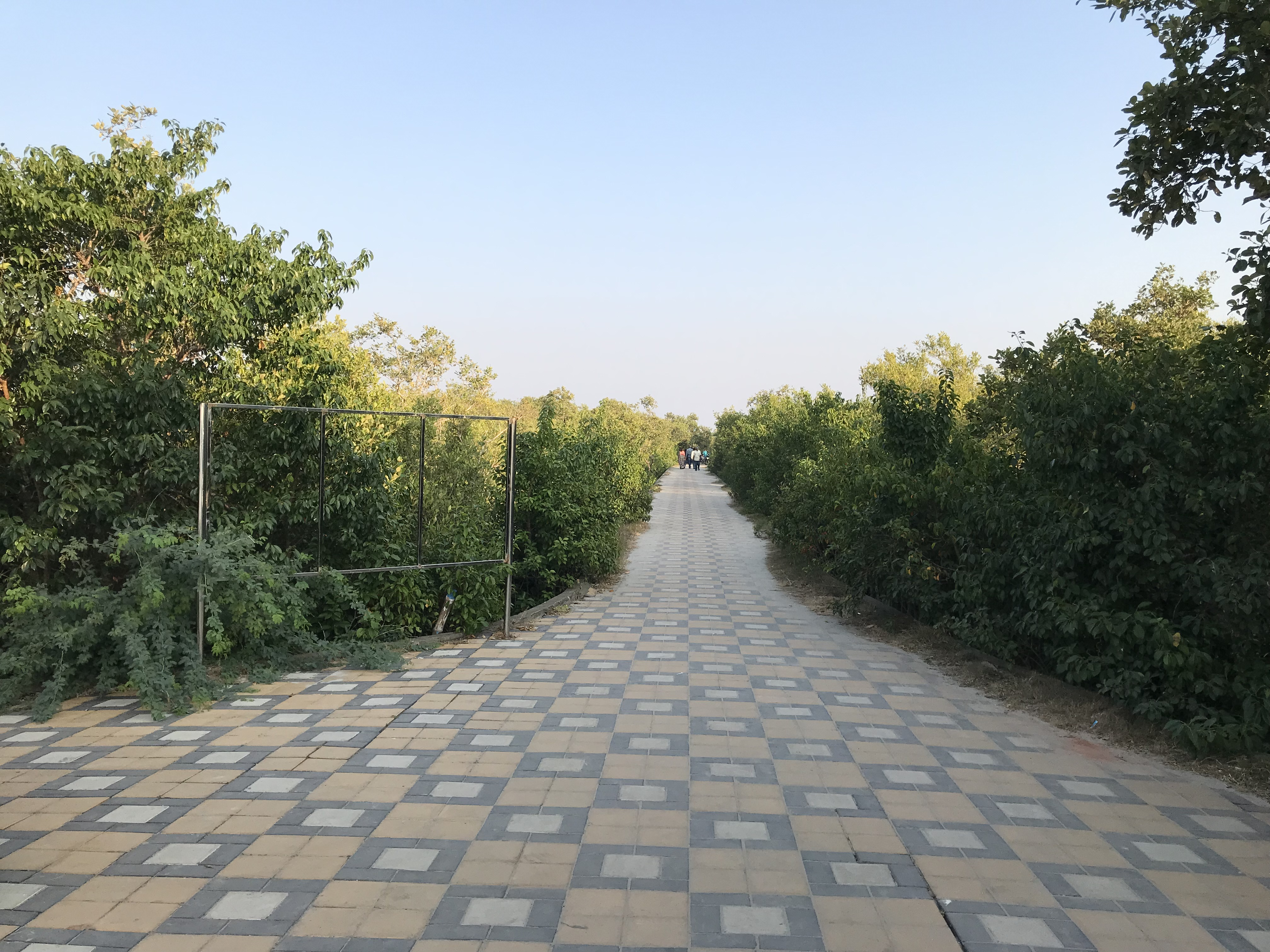
Mangrove Reserve starting point in Bakkhali

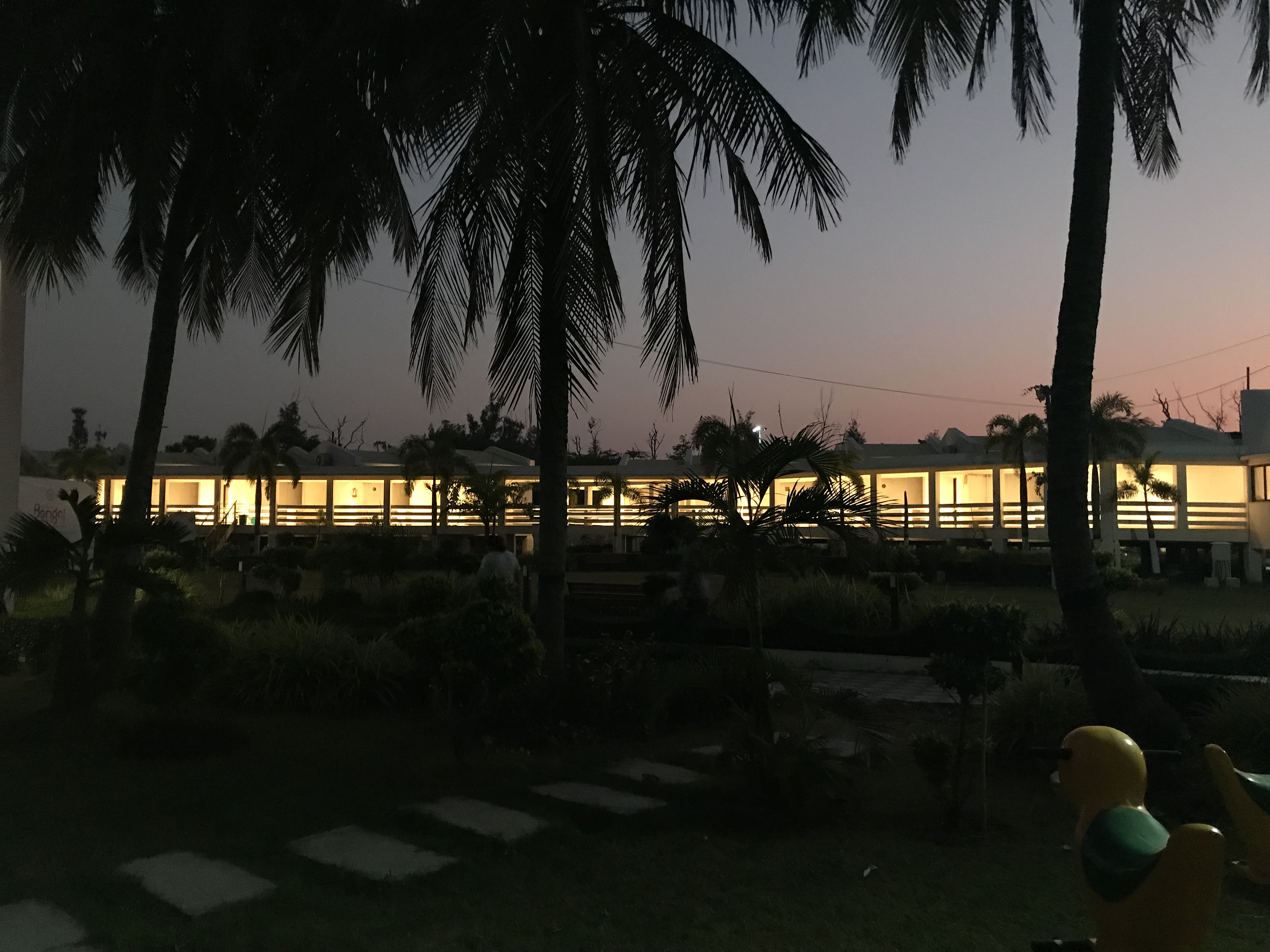
Resort in Bakkhali

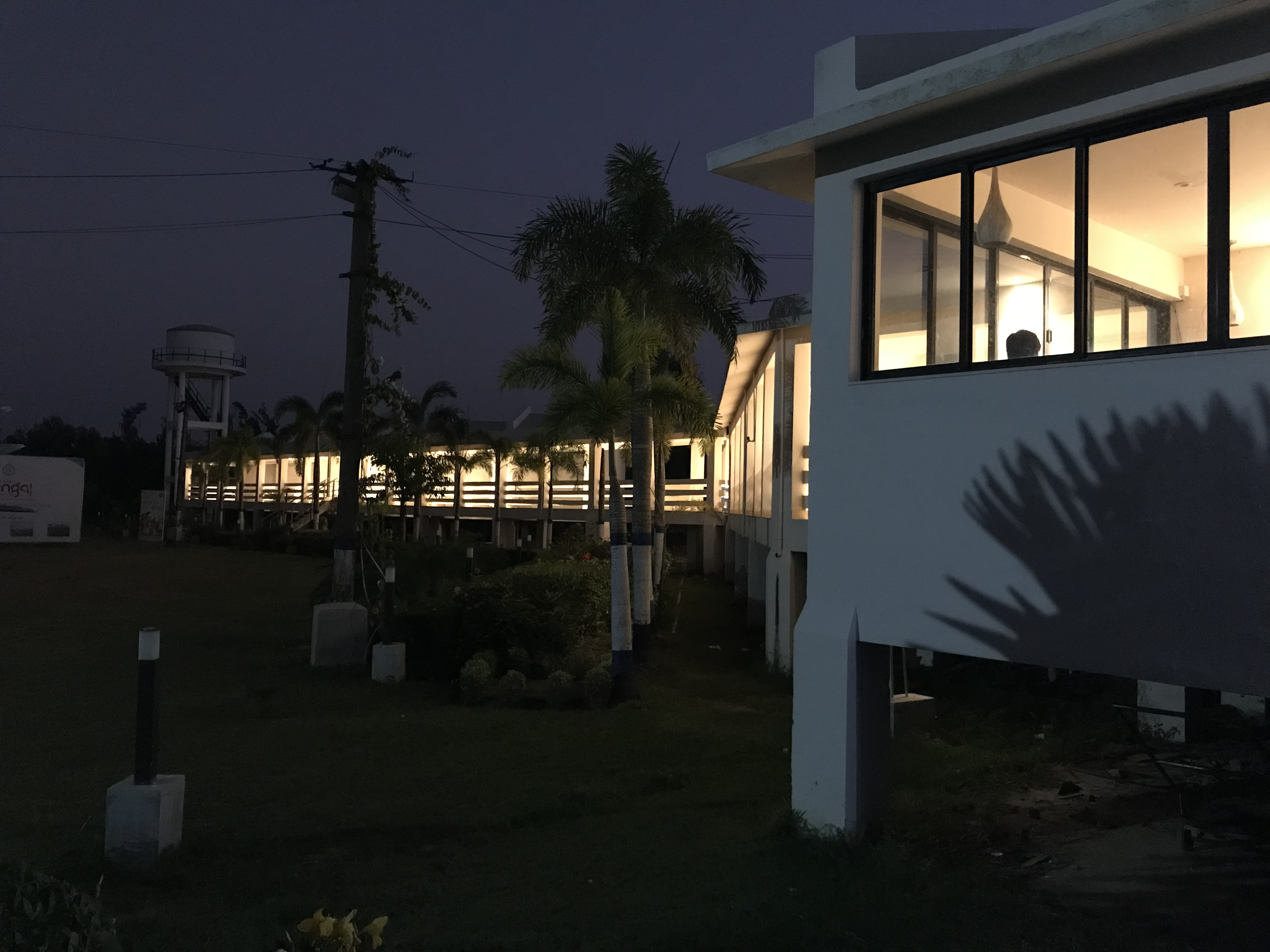
Resort view Bakkhali

== Accessibility ==
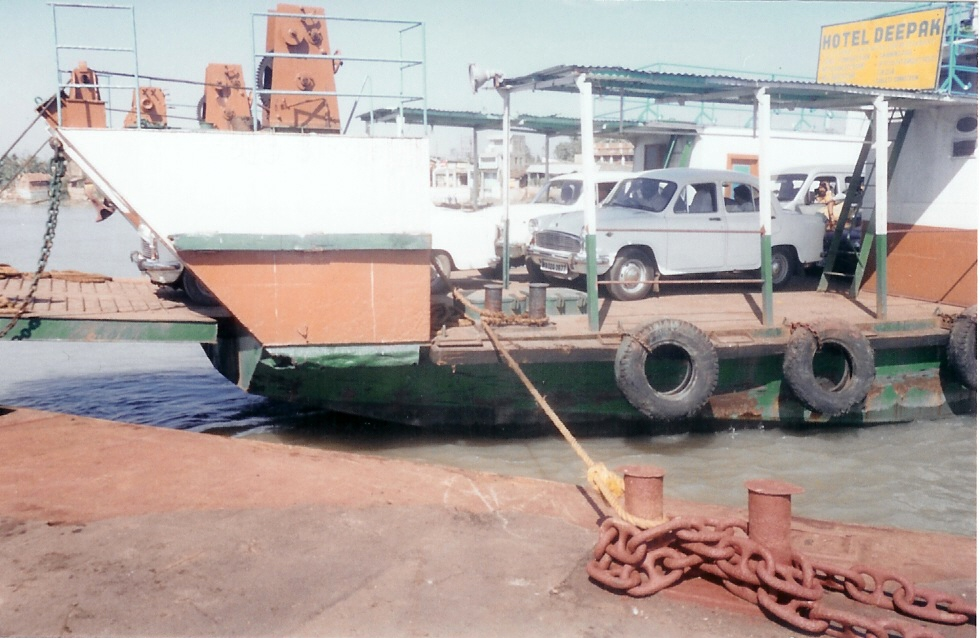
Ferry crossing across the Hatania Doania creek at Namkhana

Jambudwip and Lothian are two forested islands nearby. The only means of travel to the islands is by crude motorised country boat as there are no jetties in the islands. These islands are also places of tourist attraction nowadays.

== Transport ==
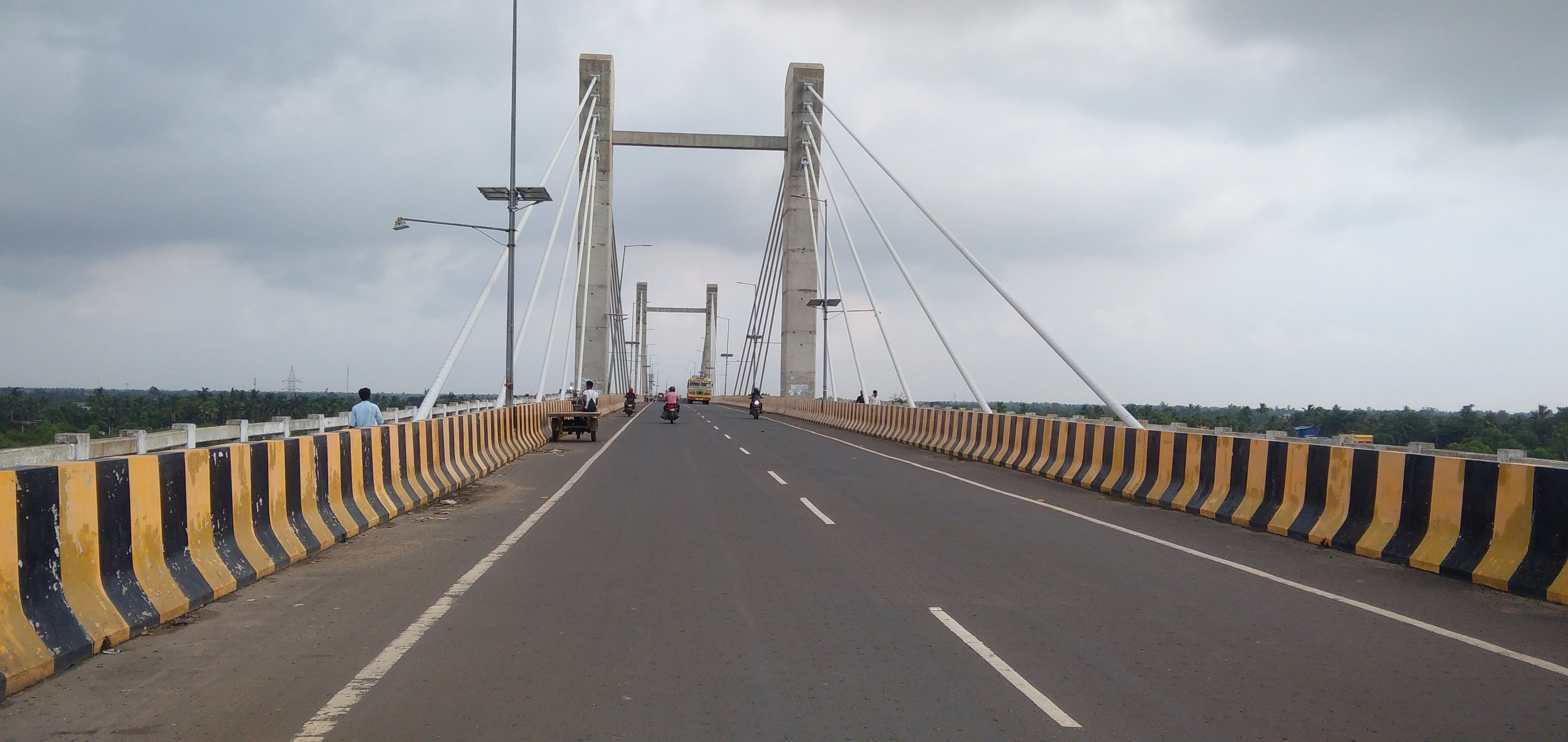
Hatania Doania Bridge on NH-12

Bakkhali lies on the National Highway 12, approximately 125 km from Kolkata. Namkhana railway station is nearby.

== Healthcare ==
There is a primary health centre at Fraserganj, with ten beds.
