= Deivi =

Deivi is a given name. Notable people with the name include:

- Deivi Cruz (born 1972), Dominican baseball player
- Deivi García (born 1999), Dominican baseball player
- Deivi Julio (born 1980), Colombian boxer

== See also ==
- Divi (disambiguation)
