= Jambudvipa (disambiguation) =

- Jambudvipa, philosophical region in Indian religions
- Jambudweep, Digambara Jain temple in Hastinapur, Uttar Pradesh
- Jambudwip, Bay of Bengal

== See also ==
- Jambu (disambiguation)
- Dweep (disambiguation)
- Dvipa, term in Hindu cosmology
