= Jammu (disambiguation) =

Jammu is the winter capital and second largest city of Jammu and Kashmir, India.

Jammu may also refer to:

- Jammu district, a district of Jammu and Kashmir
- Jammu Division, one of the two regions that make up the union territory of Jammu and Kashmir
- Jammu Lok Sabha constituency, Indian parliamentary constituency
- Jammu Tawi railway station, a railway station in the city of Jammu
- Jammu Cantonment, a cantonment in Jammu and Kashmir

== People with the given name ==
- Jammu Siltavuori (1926–2012), known as Jammu-setä (Uncle Jammu), Finnish child abuser and murderer

== See also ==
- Jammu and Kashmir (disambiguation)
- Jamwal, toponymic surname for people from Jammu
- Azad Kashmir, part of the Pakistani-administered Kashmir region
- Jamu, an Indonesian traditional medicine
- Jamu (disambiguation)
- Jambu (disambiguation)
