= Jamo =

Jamo can refer to:

- Jamu, a native Javanese herbal medicine-making tradition of Indonesia
- Jameson Williams, an American football wide receiver for the Detroit Lions
- Aneuk Jamee, an indigenous ethnic group of Southern Aceh, Indonesia
- Hangul consonant and vowel tables, the consonants and vowels, known as jamo, of the Korean alphabet;
  - List of Hangul jamo
  - Hangul Jamo (Unicode block);
- Jamo (company), a Danish loudspeaker manufacturer.
- Jamo, Uttar Pradesh, a village in Amethi district of Uttar Pradesh, India

== See also ==
- Jamu (disambiguation)
