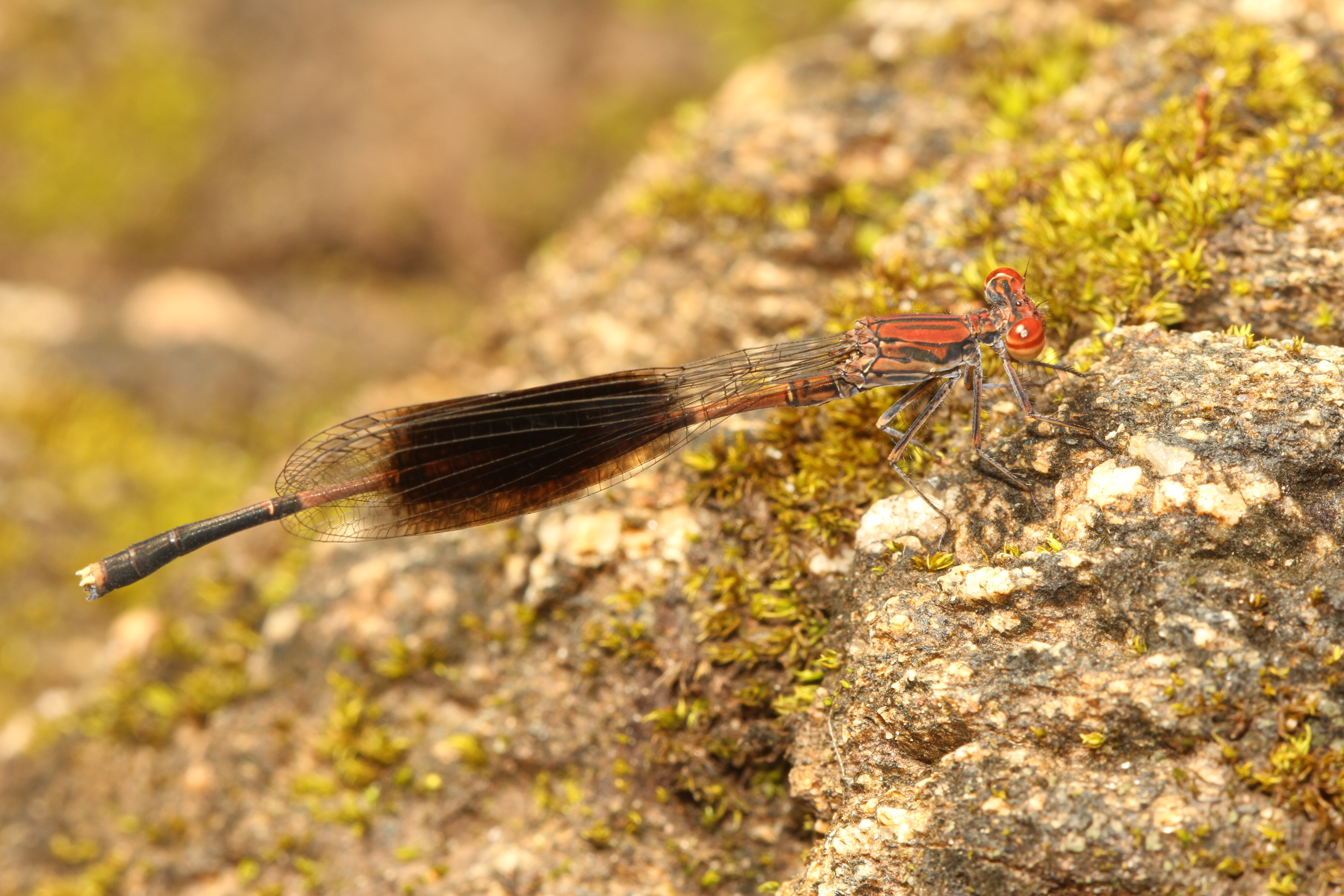
- Male
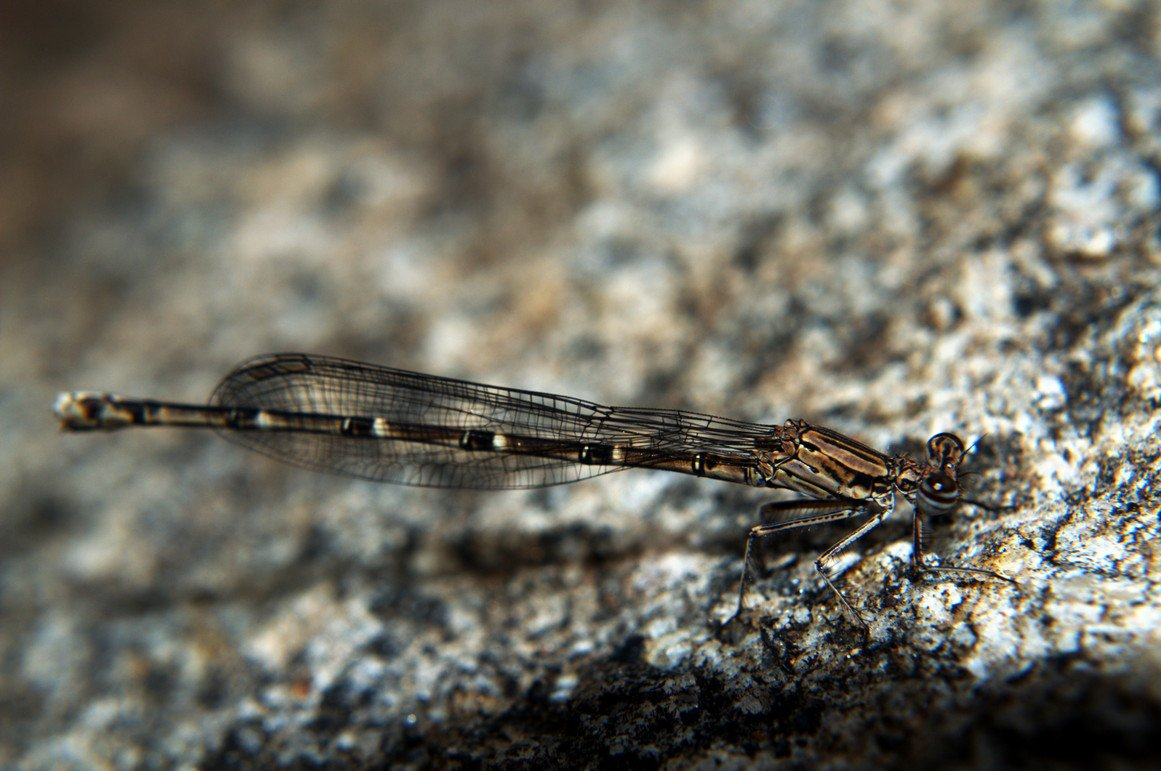
- Female

Conservation status
- Least Concern (IUCN 3.1)

Scientific classification
- Kingdom: Animalia
- Phylum: Arthropoda
- Clade: Pancrustacea
- Class: Insecta
- Order: Odonata
- Suborder: Zygoptera
- Family: Platycnemididae
- Genus: Disparoneura
- Species: D. quadrimaculata

Binomial name
- Disparoneura quadrimaculata (Rambur, 1842)

Synonyms
- Argia quadrimaculata Rambur, 1842; Platylestes orientalis Baijal and Agarwal, 1955

= Disparoneura quadrimaculata =

Species of damselfly

Disparoneura quadrimaculata, black-winged bambootail is a damselfly species in the family Platycnemididae. It is a widely distributed species in India.

== Description and habitat ==
It is a medium sized damselfly with brick-red eyes, with two horizontal dark-red equatorial lines. Its thorax is bright brick-red on dorsum, paler on the sides. There is black and narrow mid-dorsal carina; a ante-humeral stripe; and a more or less broken but broad humeral-stripe. There is another broader irregular stripe on the mesepimeron, often broken up into two or more spots. There is a short stripe on the antero-lateral suture and a narrow stripe on the postero-lateral suture. The base of the lateral side is pale yellowish-red.

Its wings are transparent; but the fore-wings have a broad blackish-brown fascia, which extends from the node to the pterostigma. The hind-wings have a similar fascia which begins about 5 cells distal to the node and extends to the pterostigma. The pterostigma is bright ochreous, framed in thick black nervures.

Its abdomen is reddish-brown, marked with black. Segment a and segments 7 to 9 are black. Segments 2 to 6 are reddish-brown with broadly black on the apical ends. Segment 10 and anal appendages are pale brown.

Female is more robust with extensive black markings. Its thorax and abdomen are greyish-brown. Abdomen is black on dorsum and with broad apical annules in white followed by black on segments 3 to 7. Segments 3 to 8 have small paired white spots at the base, enclosed in black. Segments 8 to 10 have white marks on dorsum.

They are commonly found along streams and rivers, perches on emergent boulders and aquatic plants. It breeds in hill streams.

== See also ==
- List of odonates of India
- List of odonata of Kerala
