= Jambu =

Jambu or jumbu may refer to:

- Jambuswami (543-449 BCE), Jain monk
- Jambu, a Malay/Indonesian term for various fruits, including:
  - jambu air, Syzygium aqueum (Watery rose apple)
  - jambu batu, guava
  - jambu bol, Syzygium malaccense (Malay rose apple)
  - jambu semarang, Syzygium samarangense (wax apple)
- Jambul or jambu tree, Syzygium cumini
- Jambu, a Brazilian term for the herb Acmella oleracea
- Jambu fruit dove, a species of fruit dove (bird)
- Jambu, an orca in the South Park episode "Free Willzyx"
- Jambu (film), a 1980 Indian Tamil-language film, see list of Tamil films of 1980
- Jambu Lochan, purported founder of the Indian city of Jammu
- Janine Jambu (1942–2012), French activist and politician

== See also ==
- Jammu (disambiguation)
- Jamu (disambiguation)
- Jambudvipa (disambiguation)
  - Jambudvipa, the terrestrial world in the cosmologies of Indian religions, also an alternate name of India
- Jambulingam (director), Indian film director, see Apna Desh or Miss Mary
- Jambulingam Nadar (died 1923), Indian outlaw during the colonial era
- Jambulingam, a 1982 Indian film
- Jambulingam 3D, a 2016 Indian film
