= Hatania Doania Bridge =

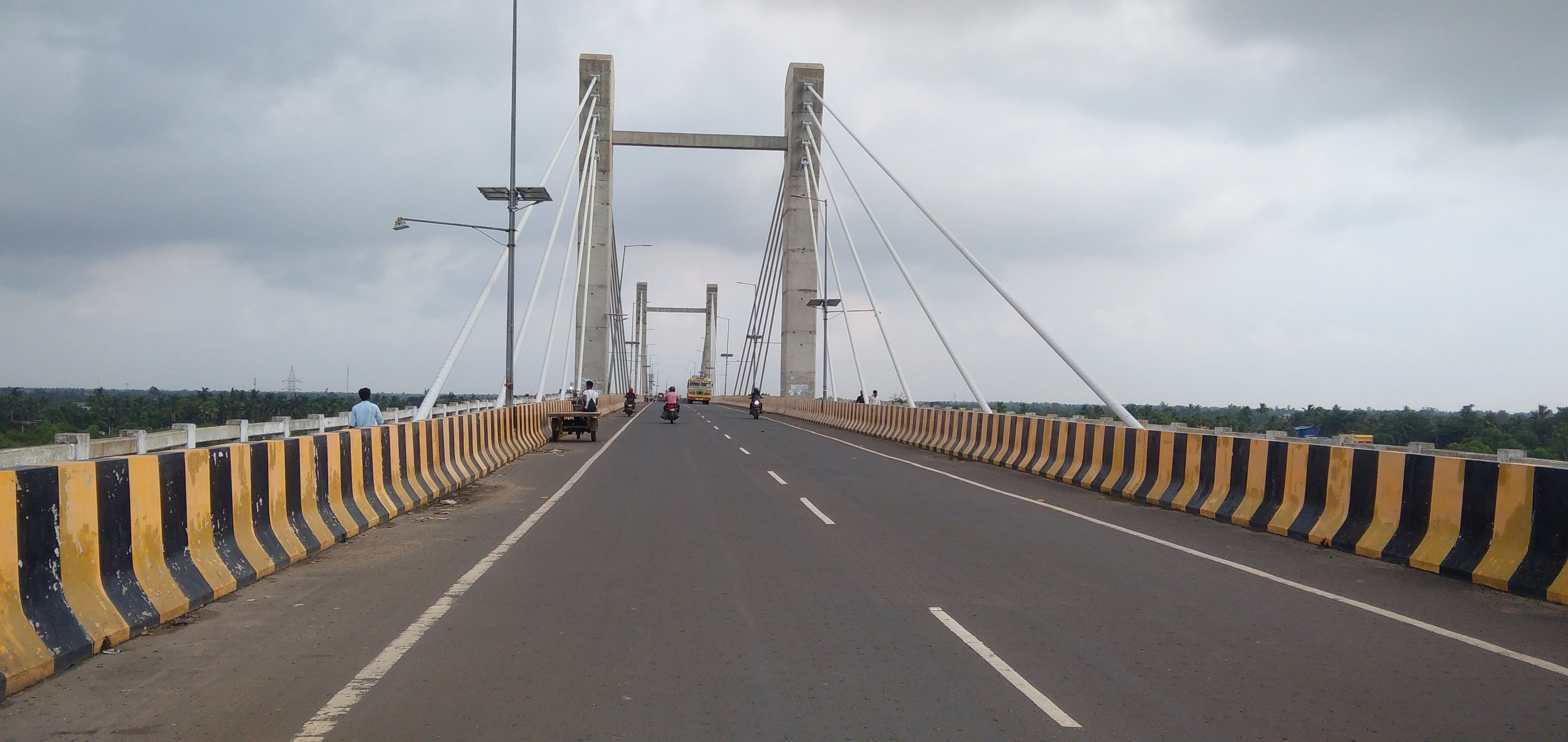
- Coordinates: 21.76°N 88.23°E
- Carries: Two lanes, one vehicular lane for each direction
- Crosses: Hatania Doania River
- Locale: Namkhana, West Bengal
- Other name: Namkhana Bridge

Characteristics
- Design: Extradosed cable-stayed bridge
- Total length: 340 metres (1,115 ft)
- Width: 10.5 metres (34 ft)
- Longest span: 170 metres (558 ft)

History
- Opened: 7 March 2019; 7 years ago

Statistics
- Toll: yes

Location
- Interactive map of Hatania Doania Bridge

Hatania Doania Bridge, also known as the Namkhana Bridge, is a toll bridge over the Hatania Doania River in the Indian state of West Bengal, linking the villages of Namkhana and Narayanpur.

Opened in 2019, with a total length of 340 metres (1,115 ft), Hatania Doania Bridge is the second extradosed cable-stayed bridge in West Bengal. It was the first bridge to be built across the Hatania Doania River after which it is named. It was constructed at a cost of approximately ₹521 crore.

== History ==
Construction of the bridge began in February 2014. The construction of the bridge was completed in 2019. The bridge is a joint initiative of the Government of West Bengal and the Government of India and was built by SP Singla Construction Pvt Ltd. and commissioned by SEL (Senbo Engineering Limited). Arup Biswas inaugurated the bridge on March 7, 2019.

== Architectural features ==
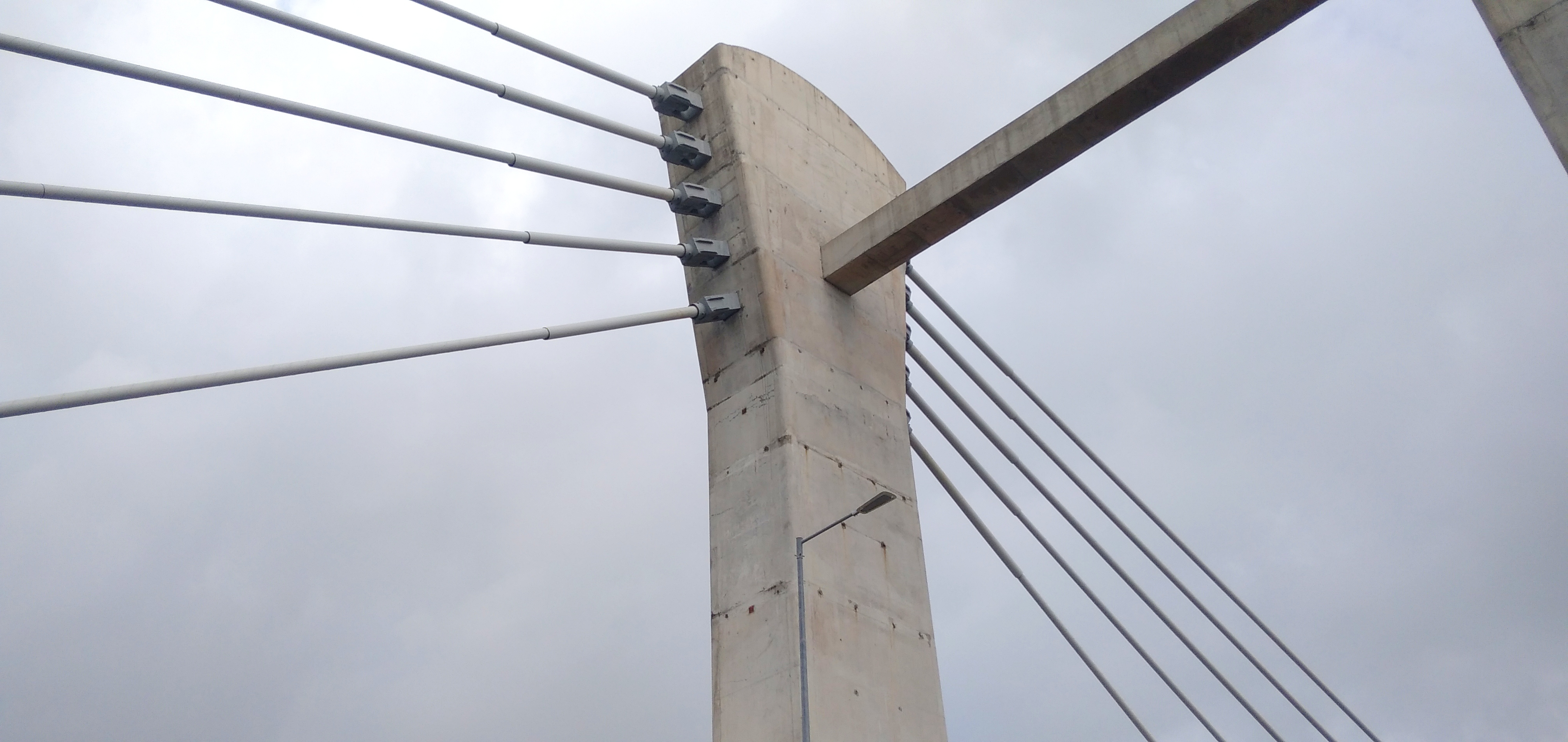
North tower of Hatania Doania Bridge

Hatania Doania Bridge is an extradosed cable-stayed bridge, with 40 cables in a fan arrangement, built using steel pylons 33 metres (108 ft) high. The deck is made of composite concrete box segment with one carriageway. The total width of the bridge is 15.6 metres (51 ft), with one lanes in each direction and a 1.5 metres (5 ft)-wide footpath on each side. The deck over the main span is 170 metres (558 ft) long. The two side spans are supported by parallel wire cables and are 85 metres (279 ft) long.
