= Dives =

Dives may refer to:

- Dives, Oise, a French commune of the Oise département
- Dives (river), a river in Normandy
- Dives-sur-Mer, a commune in Normandy
- Dives (bird), a genus of New World blackbirds
- Dis Pater, Roman god of the underworld, contracted from Dives Pater ("Father of Riches")
- Dives, 'the rich man' in the parable of the rich man and Lazarus
- Chrysophylax Dives, "Goldward the Rich," the dragon in Farmer Giles of Ham
- Lewis Dives, English Member of Parliament
- Mont de la Dives, mountain in Amsterdam Island, French Southern and Antarctic Lands
- SU Dives, a French association football club founded in 1929

== See also ==
- Dive (disambiguation)
