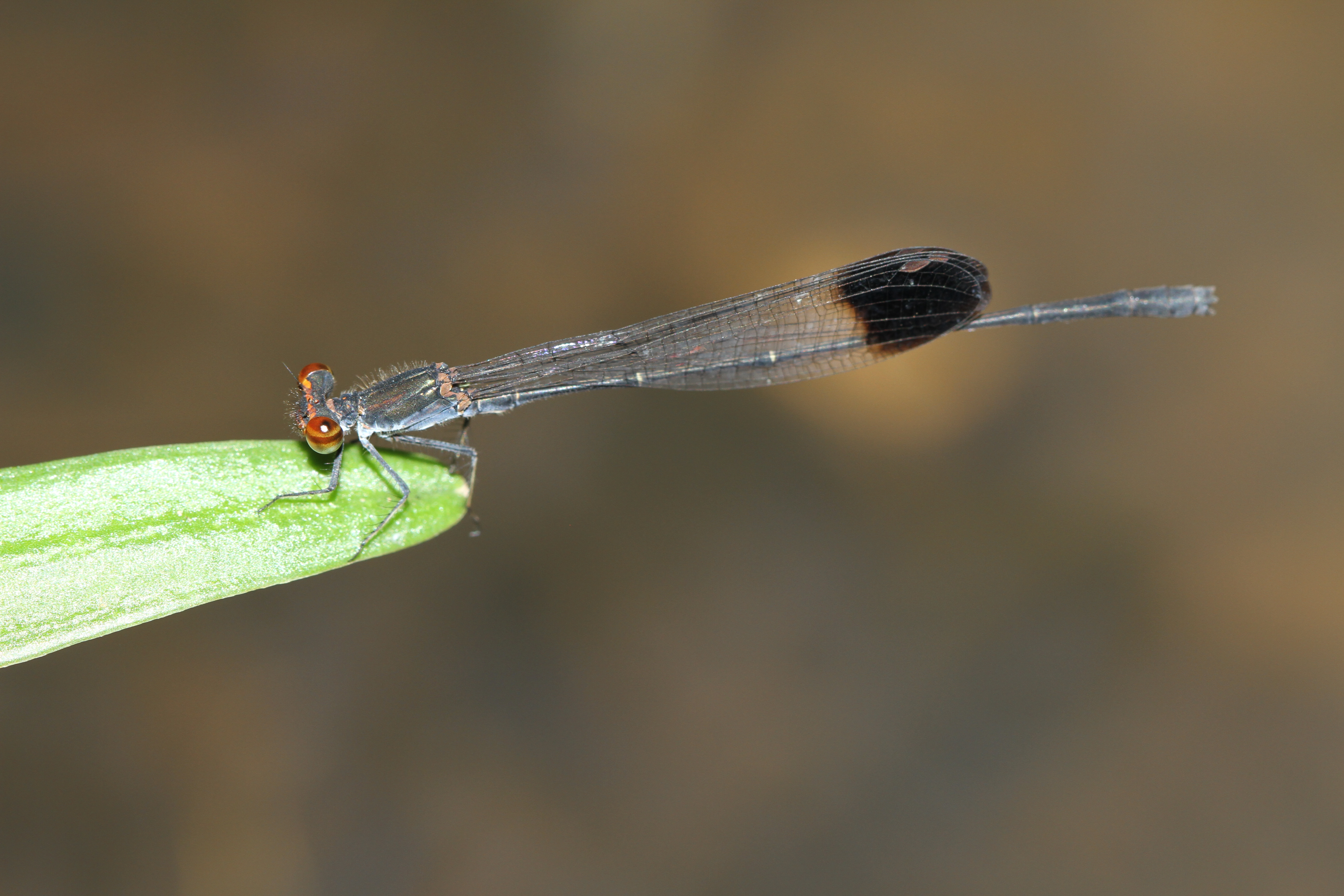
- Male
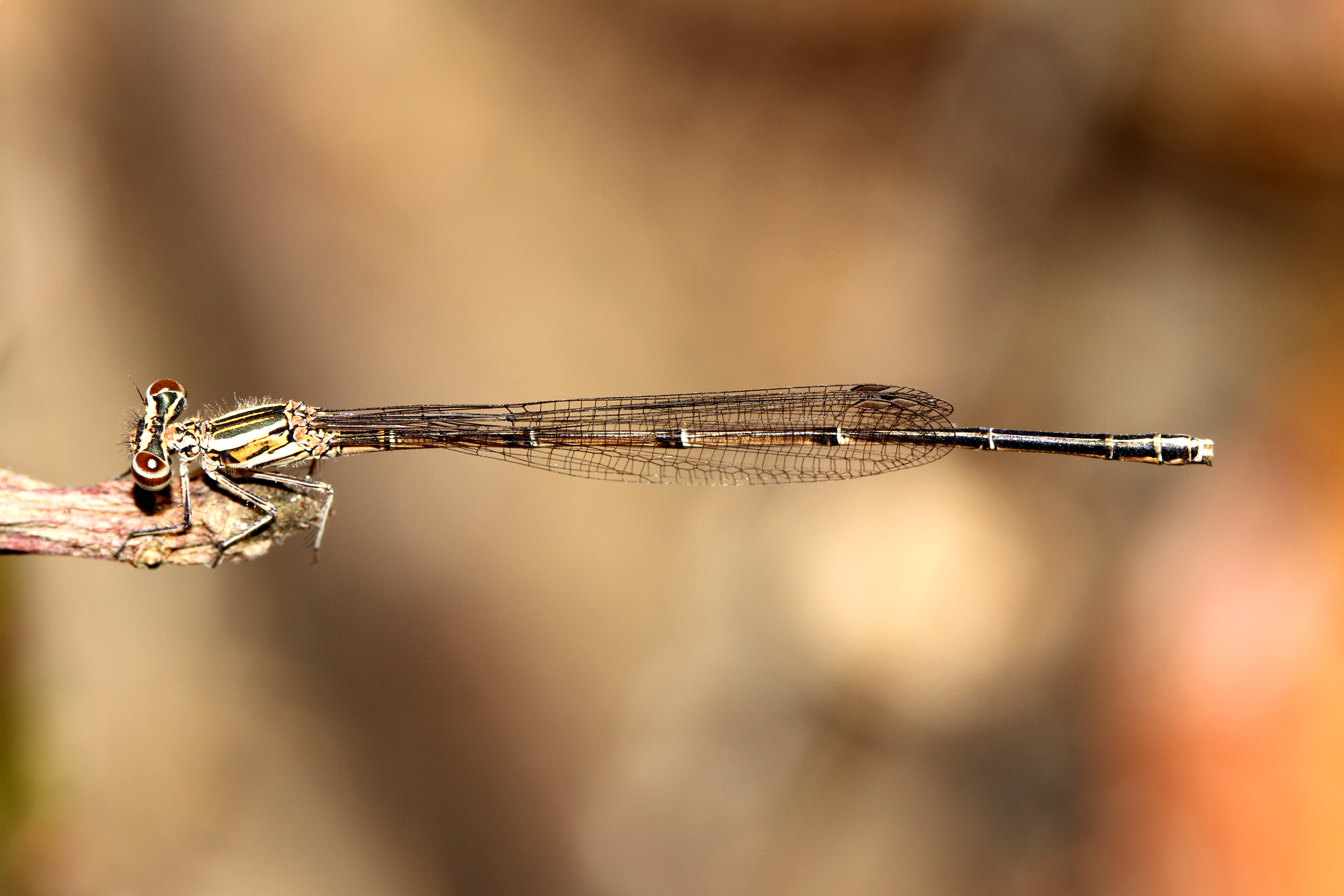
- Female

Conservation status
- Vulnerable (IUCN 3.1)

Scientific classification
- Kingdom: Animalia
- Phylum: Arthropoda
- Clade: Pancrustacea
- Class: Insecta
- Order: Odonata
- Suborder: Zygoptera
- Family: Platycnemididae
- Genus: Disparoneura
- Species: D. apicalis

Binomial name
- Disparoneura apicalis (Fraser, 1924)

Synonyms
- Chloroneura apicalis Fraser, 1924

= Disparoneura apicalis =

Species of damselfly

Disparoneura apicalis, black-tipped bambootail is a damselfly species in the family Platycnemididae. It is endemic to Western Ghats. It was described from Kodagu, Karnataka, on the upper reaches of the Kaveri River. It is also found to occur in Kuruvadweep, Wayanad, Kerala, along the banks of Kabini River and Gopala Chikkamagaluru, Karnataka, along with the banks of river Bhadra.

== Description and habitat ==
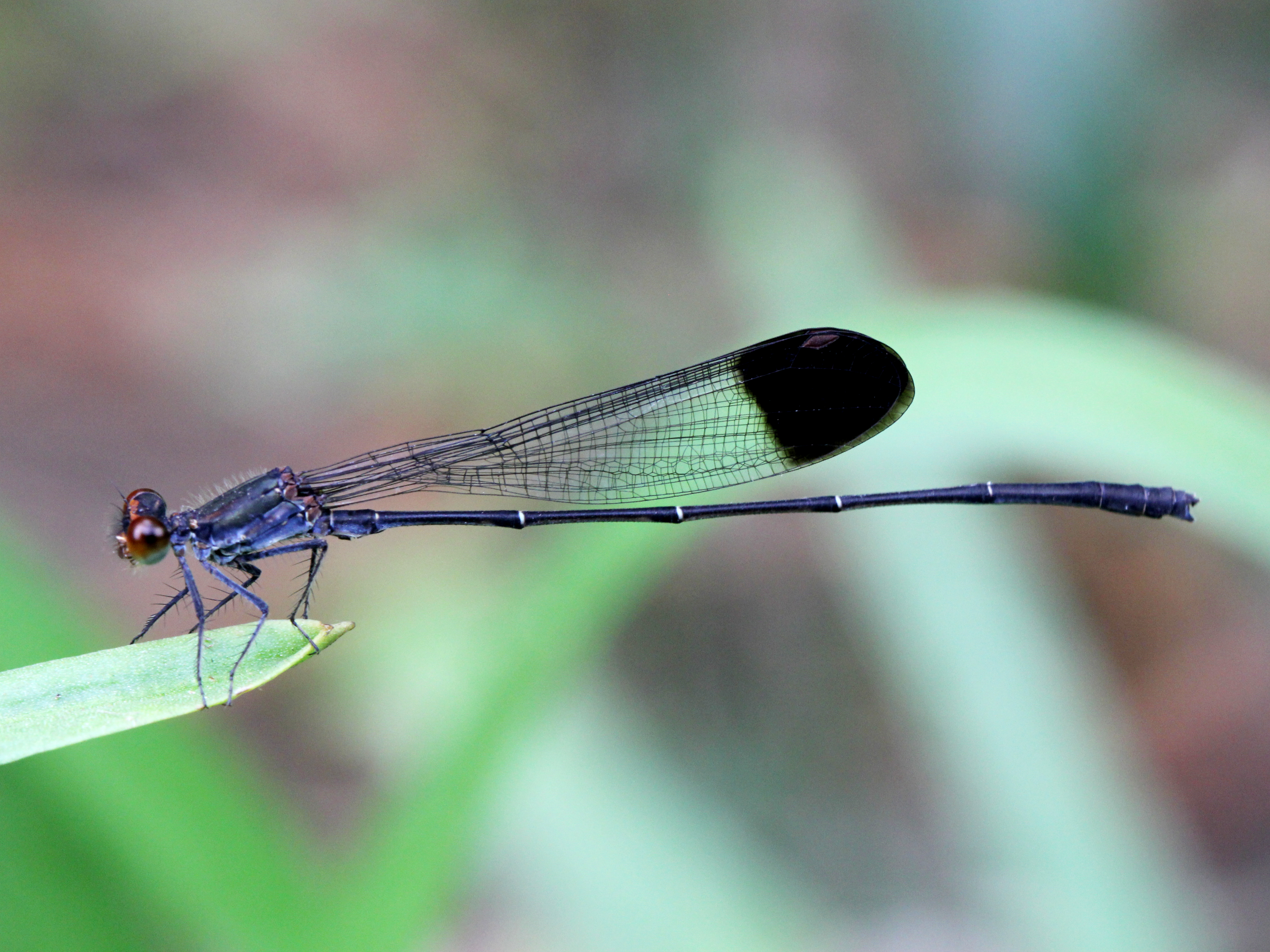
Disparoneura apicalis, male in Kuruvadweep

It is a medium sized damselfly with reddish-brown eyes, yellowish-green beneath. Its thorax is metallic greenish-black on dorsum. There is a narrow ante-humeral brick-red stripe which get obscured by pruinescence in adults. There is also a brownish-white stripe on the sides between the lateral sutures which is also obscured by pruinescence in adults. Base of the lateral sides are well pruinosed in adults. Wings are transparent with the apices of the wings, deep blackish-brown. The pterostigma is dark reddish-brown. Abdomen is bronze-brown, dark on dorsum, with small, white basal rings on segments 2 to 8. Anal appendages are black. The broad black apices to the wings will help to distinguish it from all other species in the same genus.

The eyes of the female are yellowish-white with a polar cap and an equatorial belt of reddish-brown. Its thorax is black on dorsum and yellowish-white on the sides, marked with black and brown. Wings are transparent. Its abdomen is yellowish-white, broadly marked with black on dorsum.

It is found in small colonies along the banks of the river, well shaded by overhanging trees. Females are found hiding in riparian zones.

== See also ==
- List of odonates of India
- List of odonata of Kerala
