= Disparoneura =

Scientific classification
- Kingdom: Animalia
- Phylum: Arthropoda
- Class: Insecta
- Order: Odonata
- Suborder: Zygoptera
- Family: Platycnemididae
- Genus: Disparoneura; Selys, 1860

Genus of damselflies

Disparoneura is a genus of damselflies in the family Platycnemididae. It contains the following species:

- Disparoneura apicalis (Fraser, 1924)
- Disparoneura quadrimaculata (Rambur, 1842)
