= Caroline Dive =

Professor of Cancer Pharmacology

Caroline Dive CBE
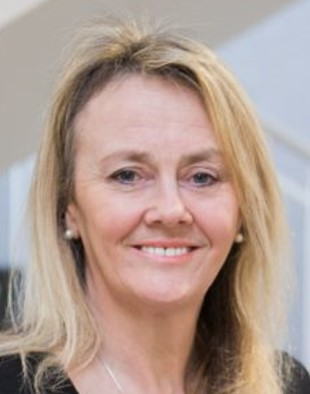
- Professor Caroline Dive CBE
- Born: April 1962 (age 64)
- Education: University of London (BPharm)
- Scientific career
- Fields: Cancer; Pharmacology
- Workplaces: Aston University; University of Manchester; Cancer Research UK
- Thesis: Flow cytoenzymology with special reference to cancer chemotherapy (1988)
- Website: www.cruk.manchester.ac.uk/Our-Research/CEP/CEP-Home

Caroline Dive CBE (born April 1962) is a British cancer research scientist. Dive is Professor of Cancer Pharmacology at the University of Manchester, Director of the CRUK National Biomarker Centre and co-director of the CRUK Lung Cancer Centre of Excellence. She is the past president of The European Association for Cancer Research (EACR).

Dive's citation upon election as Fellow of the Academy of Medical Sciences describes her as internationally renowned for her work on the development of liquid biopsy methods which use biomarkers circulating in the blood, such as circulating tumour cells and cell-free tumour DNA, to diagnose and monitor cancer.

== Education ==
Dive was educated at the University of London, where she awarded a First Class Honours Bachelor of Pharmacy in 1984. She went on to complete her postgraduate degree in experimental cancer chemotherapy at the MRC Clinical Oncology and Radiotherapeutic Unit in Cambridge.

== Research ==
After completing her PhD, Dive set up her own group at Aston University's School of Pharmaceutical Sciences in Birmingham, studying the mechanisms of drug-induced tumour cell death. She then moved to what became the Faculty of Life Sciences at the University of Manchester and was awarded a Lister Institute of Preventative Medicine Research Fellowship before moving to the Cancer Research UK Manchester Institute in 2003.

It was at the Manchester Institute that she moved away from basic cancer research to set up a new translational research team focussed on biomarkers, working closely with The Christie Hospital in Manchester.

She set up the Clinical Pharmacology Fellowship scheme in 2005 and has been training clinical fellows in the lab ever since.

Dive and her team are developing ‘liquid biopsies’ to hunt cancer cells that have broken free from tumours and are circulating in the bloodstream. Her focus is lung cancer.

Dive says the most important work she's published so far was in 2014, which she said was "a real step change for small cell lung cancer research." They showed that it's possible to take tumour cells that are circulating in a patient's blood and grow them to form tumours in the lab in mice. It was the first time a small cell lung tumour has been grown in this way and didn't require an invasive biopsy. This work allows the team to study lung cancer biology and test new treatments. The work was published in Nature Medicine.

In April 2017, Dive's lab was amongst the Cancer Research UK Manchester Institute labs severely damaged by the fire at the Christie Hospital.

More recently, Dive has been working with Dr Phil Crosbie at the Christie Hospital to deliver Lung Health Checks in supermarket car parks around Manchester, aka 'Scans in Vans'. Smokers and ex-smokers were invited by their GP to attend the check at a mobile van, which would assess their individual lung cancer risk. Those at high risk were offered an immediate CT scan. More than half of those attending qualified for the scan, which identified one cancer for every 33 CT scans. Early detection of lung cancer is key to improving patient outcomes. 9 out of 10 patients diagnosed with a cancer through these scans had the opportunity to have a curative treatment.

She has an h-index of 84 according to Google Scholar.

== Awards and honours ==
Dive was elected as a member of the European Molecular Biology Organization (EMBO) in 2020, a Fellow of the British Pharmacological Society in 2012 and a Fellow of the Academy of Medical Sciences in 2015.

She was appointed Commander of the Order of the British Empire in the 2018 New Year Honours for her services to cancer research.

Dive was awarded the Pasteur-Weizmann/Servier International Prize in 2012 and the AstraZeneca Prize for Women in Pharmacology in 2016. In 2020, she became the first recipient of the Johann Anton Merck Award in honour of her outstanding preclinical research in oncology.
