= Divi =

Divi or DIVI may refer to:

- A form of Dweep (disambiguation), the Sanskrit word for 'island', found in words Aminidivi, as well as in obsolete spellings of Maldives as 'Maldivi'
- dIVI Translation, a dual stateless IPv4/IPv6 translation technique

== See also ==
- Div (disambiguation)
- Dive (disambiguation)
