= Hatania Doania River =

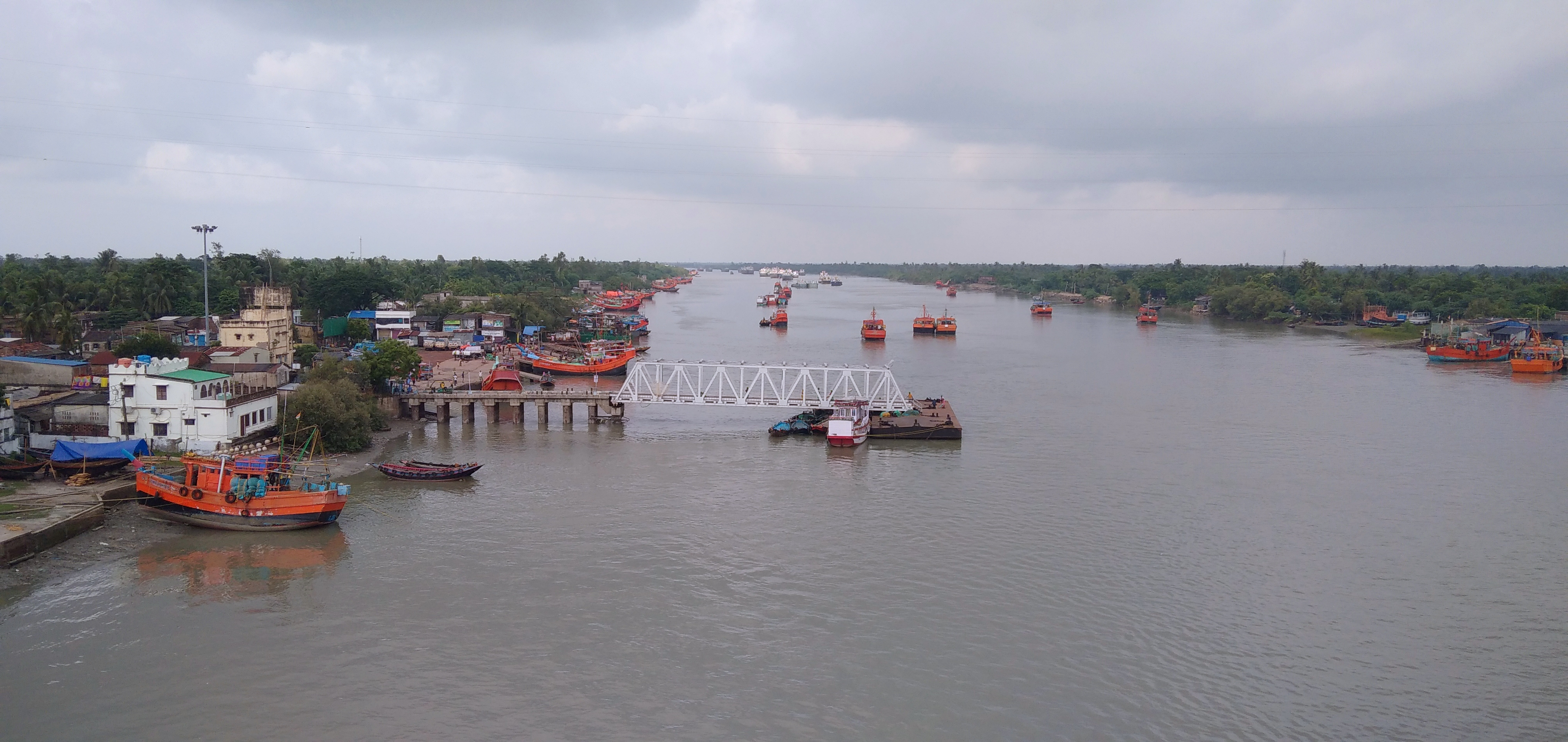
- Native name: হাতানিয়া দোয়ানিয়া (Bengali)

Location
- Country: India
- State: West Bengal
- Village: Namkhana

Physical characteristics
- Source: Muri Ganga
  - location: Namkhana
- Mouth: Saptamukhi
  - location: Dwariknagar
- Discharge
  - location: Dwariknagar

The Hatania Doania river flows through the district of South 24 Parganas, West Bengal province of India. Namkhana is on its north bank and Narayanpur is on its south bank. There is a ferry service to cross the river and a vessel service for vehicles. A bridge was in the process of construction, and has since been constructed and inaugurated (March 7, 2019).

== See also ==
- List of rivers of India
