= Mangōraukawa / Lake Dive =

Lake in New Zealand

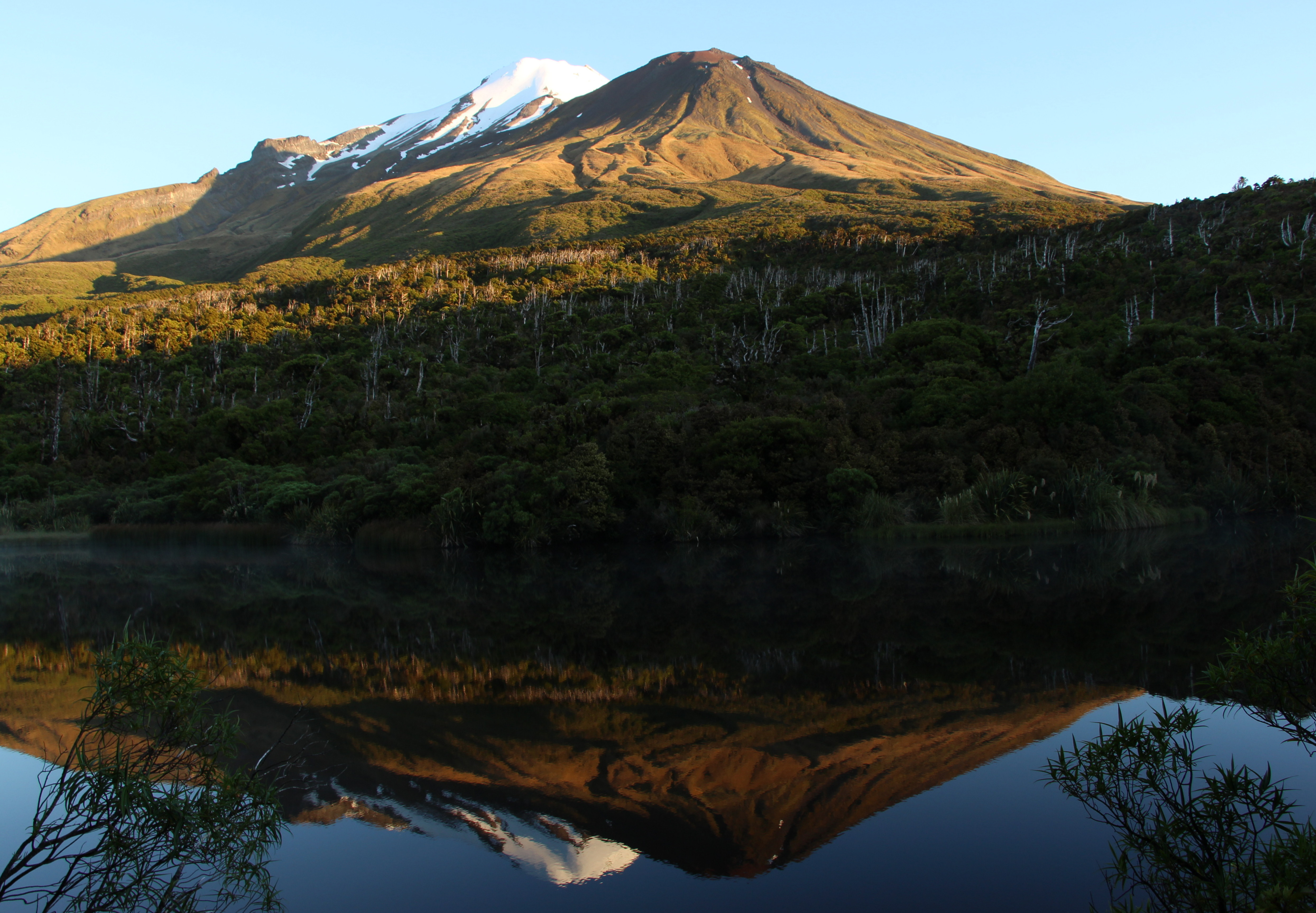

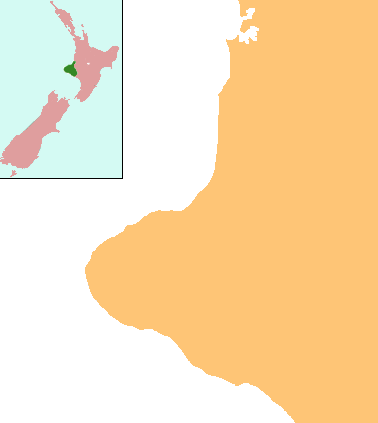
- Location within Taranaki Region
- Location: North Island
- Coordinates: 39.3354°S 174.0591°E
- Basin countries: New Zealand
- Surface elevation: 907 m (2,976 ft)

Mangōraukawa / Lake Dive, formerly known as Lake Dive, is located in the south-east of the Egmont National Park at a height of 907 m (2,976 ft) above sea level. It was discovered in 1887 by Bradshaw Dive on his descent from the summit when he saw what he believed to be a lake. A party led by Thomas Dawson later confirmed that it was indeed a lake. In April 1964 the Lake Dive Hut was opened a short distance from the lake.

As part of the Collective Redress Act 2025, some features in Taranaki were renamed, and Lake Dive was given the dual name Mangōraukawa / Lake Dive. The name changes came into effect on 1 April 2025.
