= Dweep =

1999 video game

- Publisher: Dexterity Software
- Platform: Windows
- Release: June 1, 1999
- Genre: Puzzle

Dweep is a puzzle game published in 1999 by Dexterity Software.

== Gameplay ==
Dweep is a purple creature who must navigate a series of dangerous obstacles to rescue defenseless baby Dweeps.

Obstacles include lasers, heat plates, bombs, and lots of other hazards. Dweep must bypass these using only available non-violent tools such as mirrors, wrenches, and buckets of water. The non-violent, mentally challenging nature of the game was a deliberate design feature.

The game package contains 30 original game levels plus one secret bonus level. Dweep Gold also includes five free bonus levels and two expansion packs (20 levels each), as well as a number of custom levels.

== Awards ==
- Dweep won the 2000 Shareware Industry Award.
- Dweep won Computer Gaming World's Board, Puzzle, & Logic Games category at ZDNet's 7th Annual Shareware Awards.
- The expansion pack, Dweep Gold, won the 2001 Shareware Industry Award for Best Action/Arcade Game. (beating out Arkanoid for the honour)

== Credit ==
Dweep was created and programmed by Steve Pavlina, with music by Michael Huang. Pavlina described the process he used to create the game in one of the posts on his blog, www.stevepavlina.com
