= Kuruvadweep =

Island in the Kabini River in Kerala, India

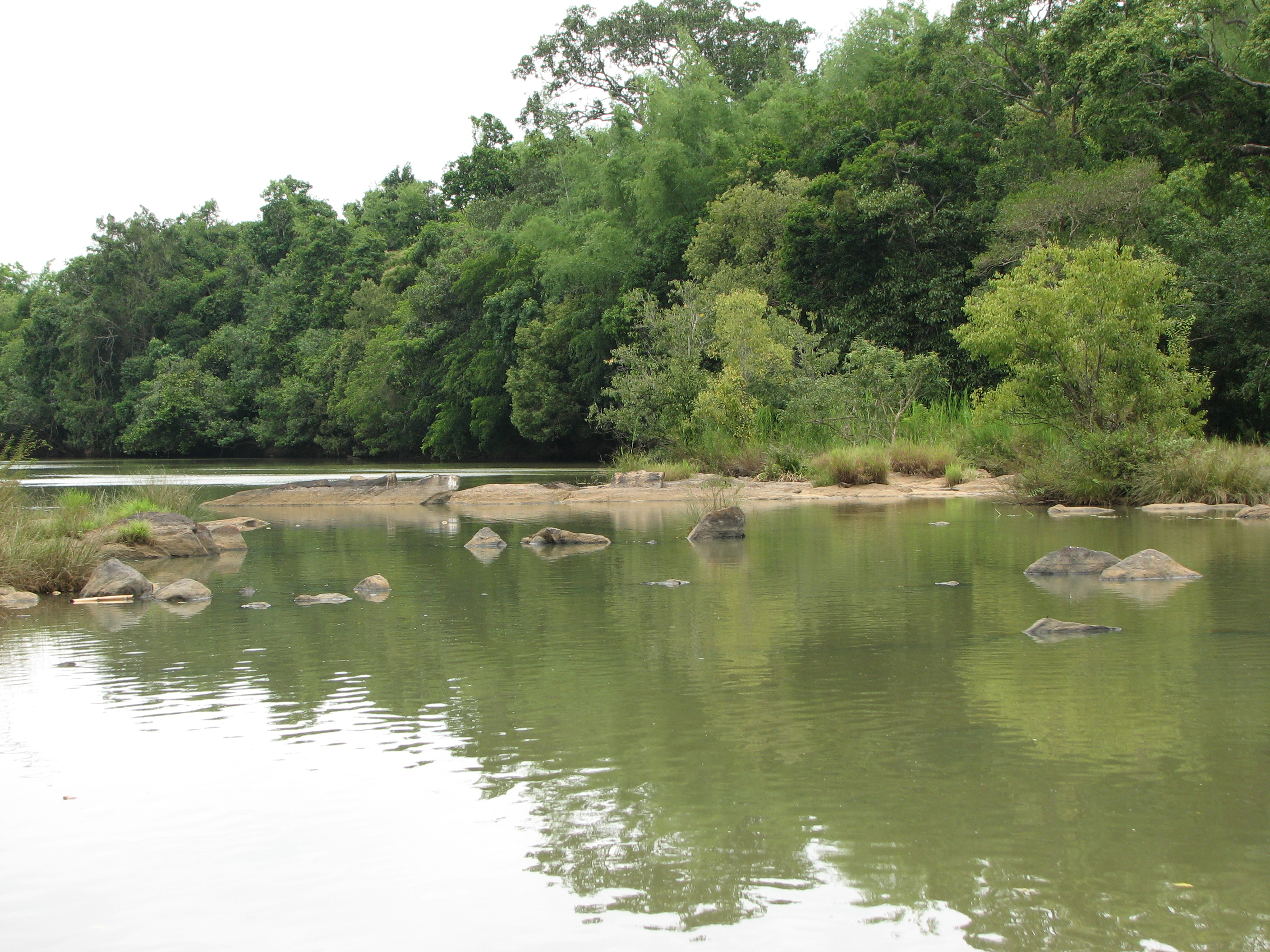
- Interactive map of Kuruvadweep

Geography
- Location: Wayanad, Kerala
- Coordinates: 11°49′18″N 76°5′32″E
- Adjacent to: Kabini river
- Area: 3.84451 km^{2} (1.48437 sq mi)

Administration
- India

Kuruvadweep is a 950-acre (3.8 km^{2}) protected river delta in the Indian state of Kerala. It comprises three densely wooded uninhabited islands and a few submergible satellite islands which lies on the banks of the tributaries of Kabini River in the Wayanad district of the state. It is uninhabited island, which is home to rare species of birds and insects like the Malabar trogon or the Disparoneura apicalis.

These islands consists of dense and evergreen forest that is uninhabited and hence home to rare kinds of flora and fauna. Its unique geographical characteristics make it a place where not only the leaves but also silence is evergreen. Its 16.7 km from the nearest town and has become a place of attraction. Recently, it has been named as the most visited place in the district by tourists from all over the globe.

The islands are surrounded by the river and is accessible by the means of rafts or fiber boats run by the Kerala Tourism Department. Entrance to the island is restricted and monitored by the Forest Department of Kerala which is an initiative to protect the forest. Due to the number of elephants and other animals in the island, a mandatory pass has to be obtained prior to the visit from the Department of Forests. Kuruvadweep is usually closed to the public from May last to early December, due to the monsoons. The torrential rainfall floods the streams and the water level rises dangerously high.

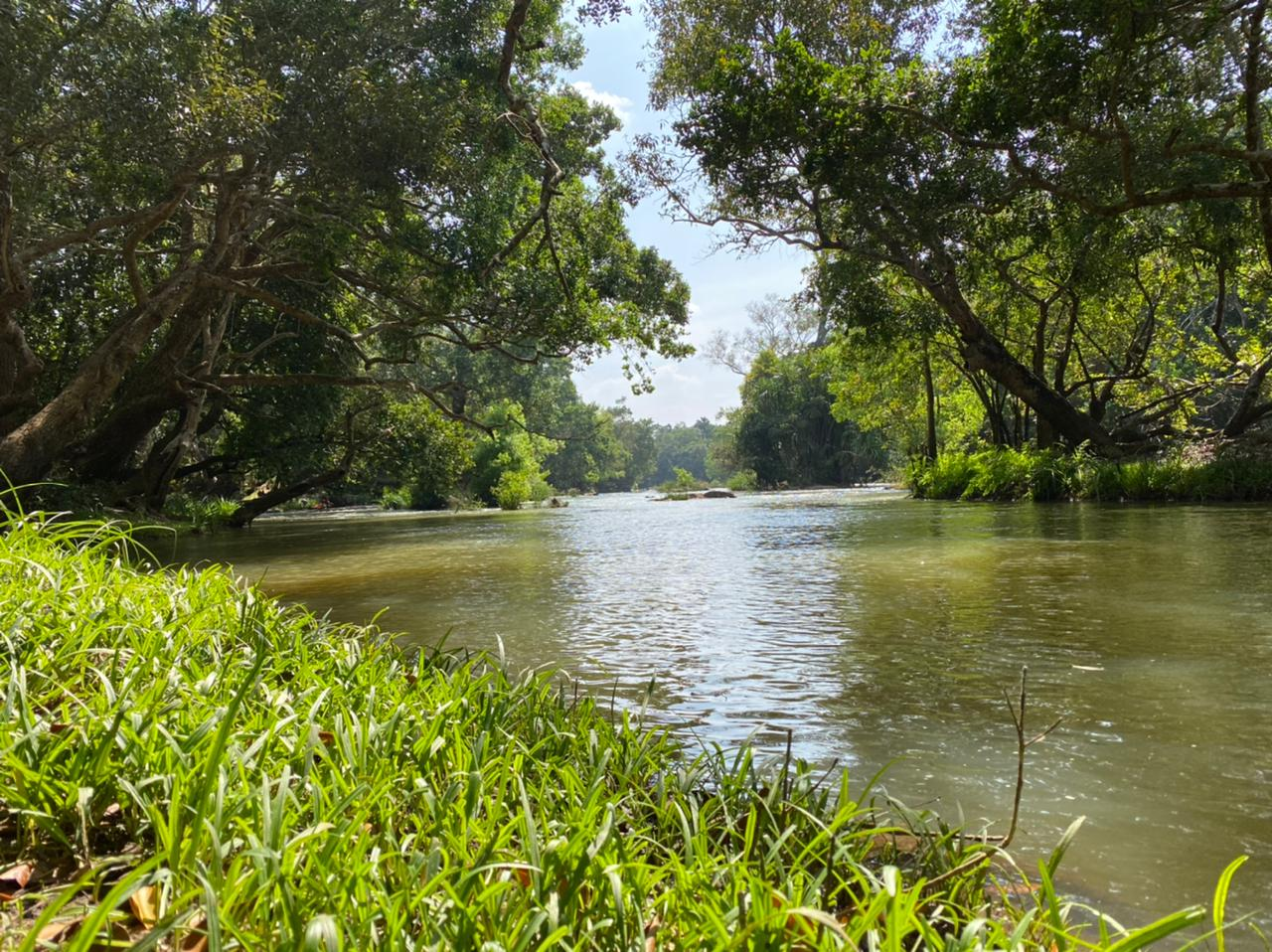
A picture of Kuruvadweep

Kuruva Islands is 17 km east of Mananthavady and 10 km north west of Pulpally which are nearby towns in the district. The river delta is located at a close proximity to the state of Karnataka.

== Gallery ==
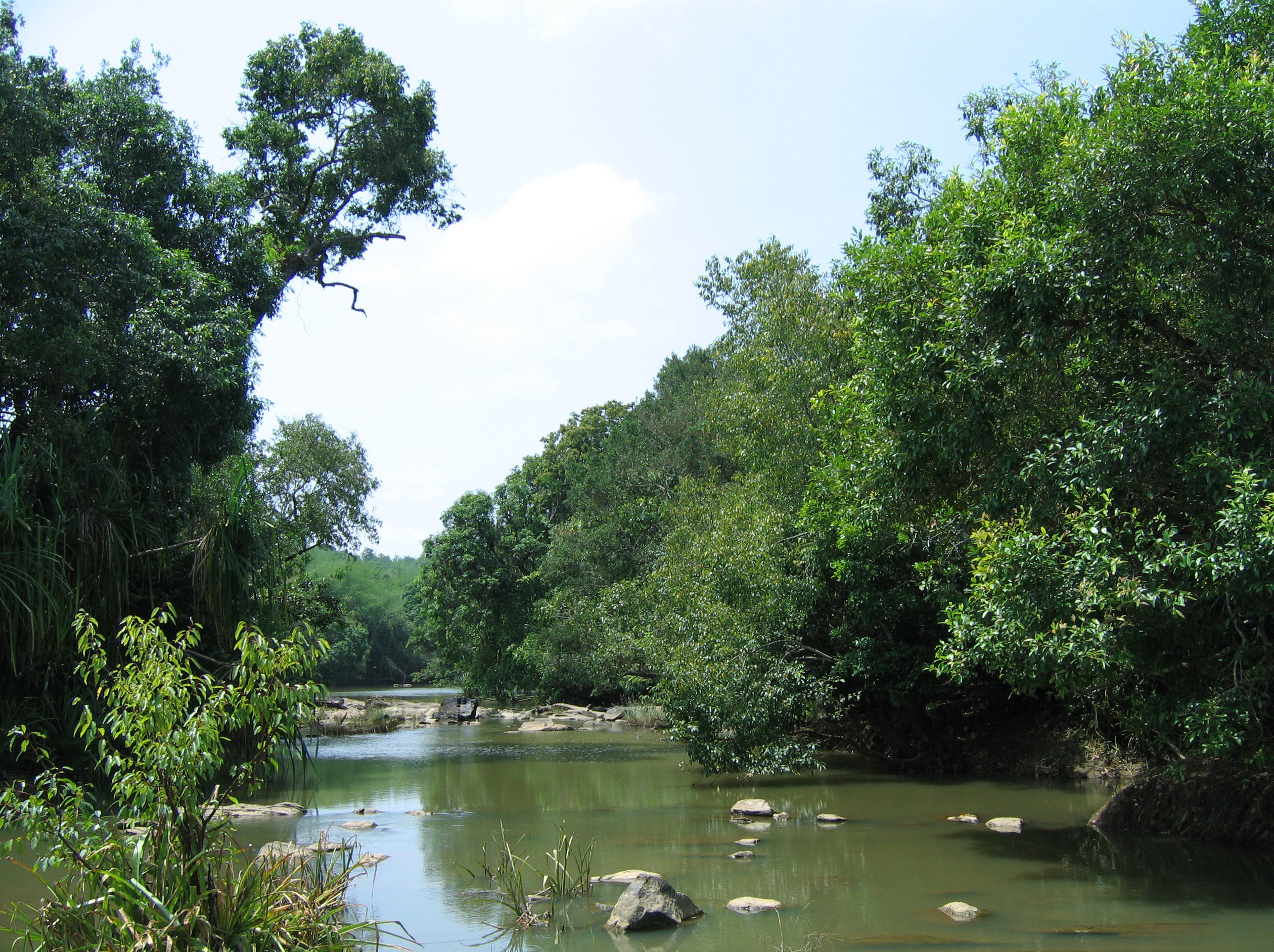

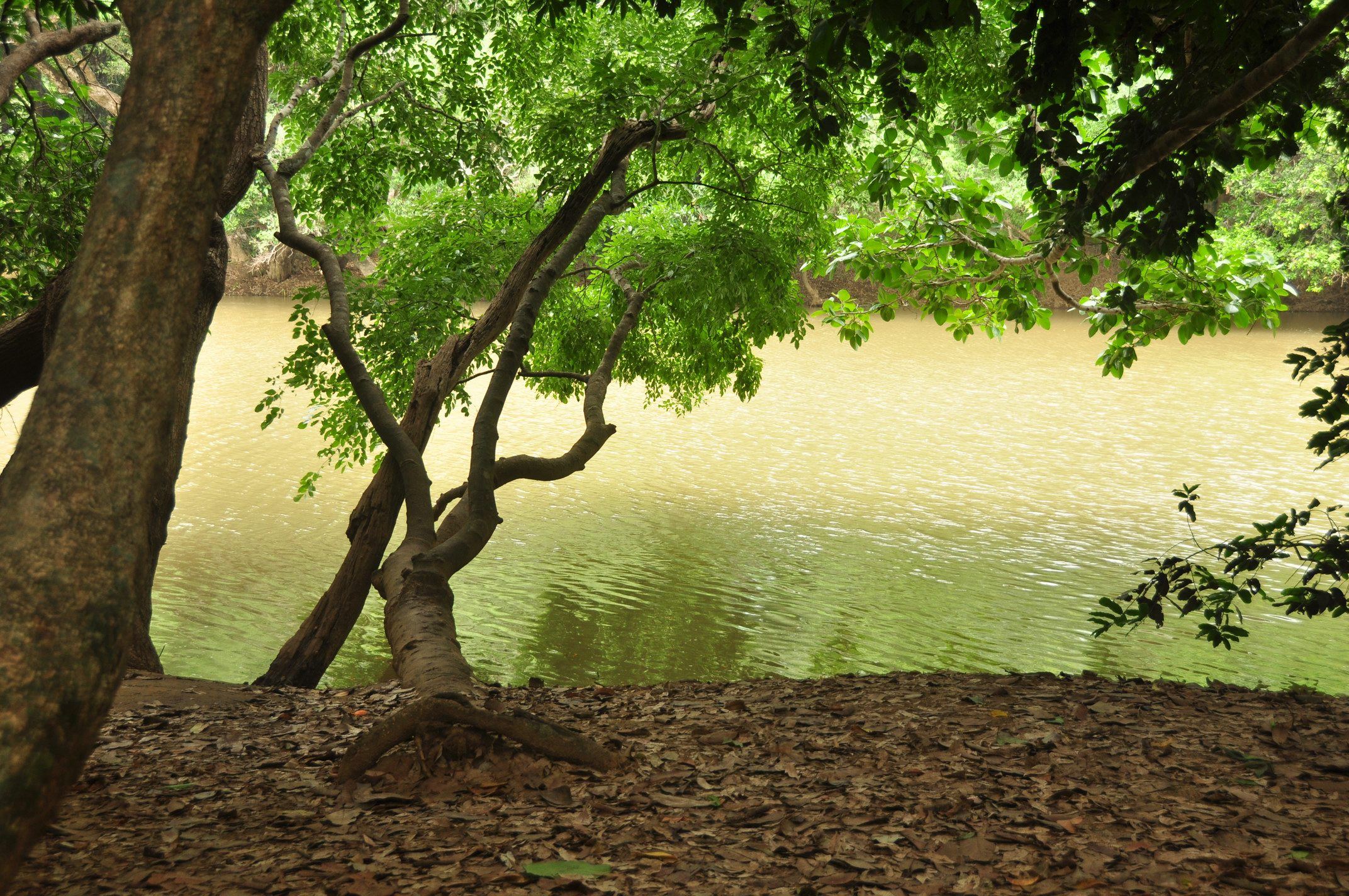

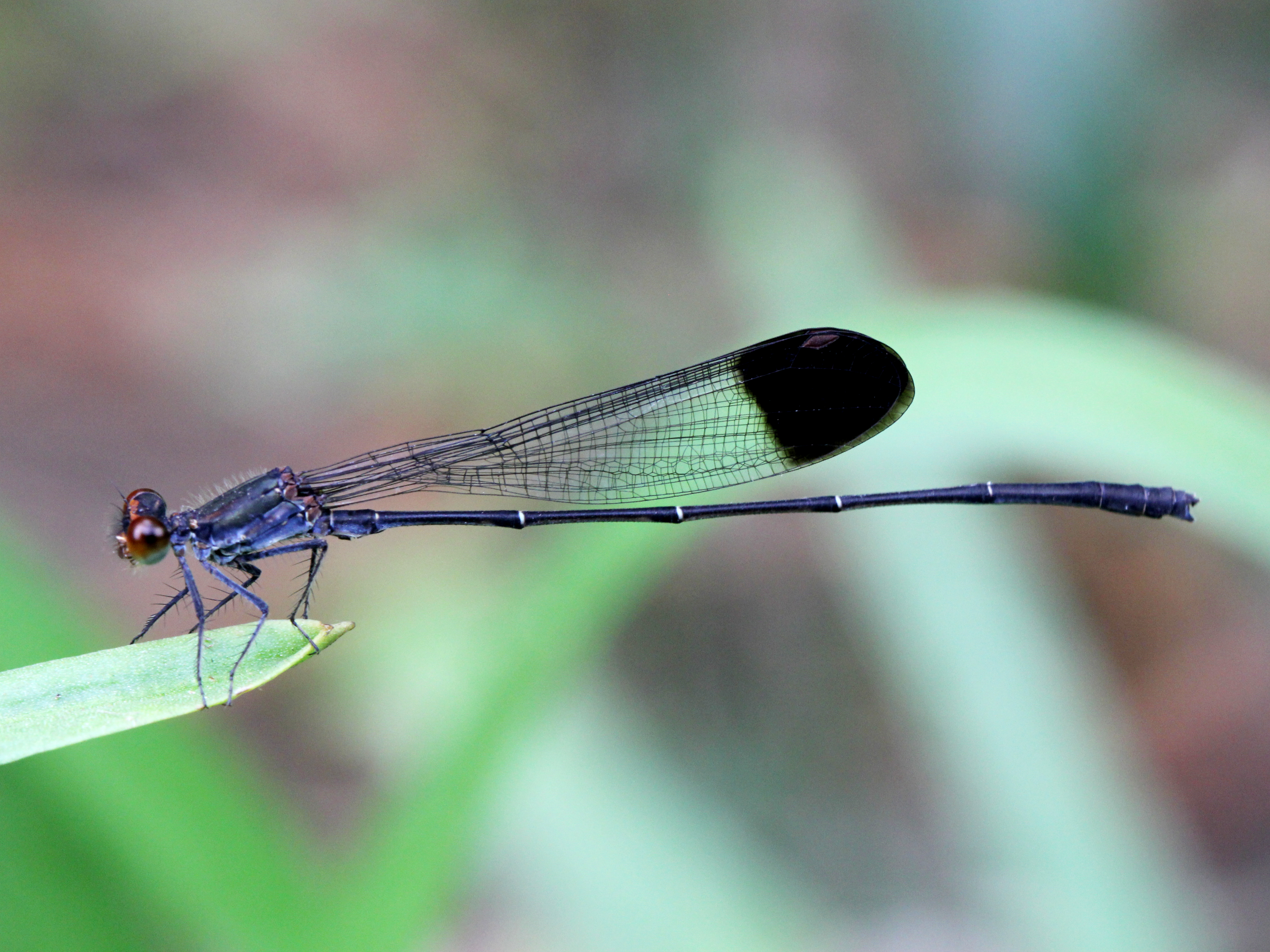
a male specimen of Disparoneura apicalis which can be found in Kuruvadweep
