= Dive: The Medes Islands Secret =

2010 video game

- Developers: Cosmonaut Games; Over the Top Games
- Publishers: Cosmonaut Games; 46 To Shinjuku Medialab, S.L. (EU)
- Platform: Wii (WiiWare)
- Release: NA: July 26, 2010; EU: July 30, 2010
- Genres: Platform, adventure

Dive: The Medes Islands Secret is a video game developed by Spanish studios Cosmonaut Games and Over the Top Games. It was first released via Wiiware in the United States on July 26, 2010 and on July 30, 2010 it was released in Europe. The game takes place in the Medes Islands area.

== Reception ==
Reception

Aggregate score
Aggregator	Score
Metacritic	74/100

Review scores
Publication	Score
Eurogamer	8/10
IGN	7.5/10
Joystiq	3/5
Nintendo Life	8/10
Nintendo World Report	8/10
Official Nintendo Magazine	82%

The game received "average" reviews according to the review aggregation website Metacritic.
