= Jambudwip =

Island in the Bay of Bengal, India

Coordinates: 21.5811°N 88.1828°E

Geography
- Location: Bay of Bengal
- Archipelago: Sundarbans

Administration
- India
- State: West Bengal
- District: South 24 Parganas

Demographics
- Population: none

Jambudwip is a of an isolated island situated in the Bay of Bengal about 8 km to the southwest of Fraserganj/Bakkhali in the South 24 Parganas district of West Bengal, India. It remains uninhabited except in the fishing season, between the months of October and February.

In the past, fishermen came from the Chittagong and Noakhali areas of Bangladesh for fishing. They developed special aptitude and traditional skills for marine fishing. The main reasons for using Jambudwip were the island's proximity to the fishing grounds, presence of a natural creek for safe harbouring of their boats, and supply of drinking water.

Tourists are not allowed on this island. Fish-drying or non-forest activities are restricted there under the Forest (Conservation) Act, 1980. However, there are small boats available from Fraserganj which take tourists around it. It is illegal to stop on the island so these boats take the tourists around without stopping.

== See also ==
- Sundarbans
- Ganges Delta
