= List of damselflies of the world (Protoneuridae) =

Protoneuridae was formerly considered a family of damselflies. Recent taxonomic revisions have classified the species previously placed in Protoneuridae into two existing families - Coenagrionidae and Platycnemididae, both in the superfamily Coenagrionoidea.

New World Protoneuridae are now sunk in Coenagrionidae and Old World Protoneuridae in Platycnemididae.

Species of damselfly, formerly in Protoneuridae:

- Arabineura khalidi
- Caconeura gomphoides
- Caconeura obscura
- Caconeura ramburi
- Caconeura risi
- Caconeura t-coerulea
- Chlorocnemis abbotti
- Chlorocnemis contraria
- Chlorocnemis eisentrauti
- Chlorocnemis elongata
- Chlorocnemis flavipennis
- Chlorocnemis interrupta
- Chlorocnemis marshali
- Chlorocnemis montana
- Chlorocnemis nigripes
- Chlorocnemis nublilipennis
- Chlorocnemis pauli
- Chlorocnemis wittei
- Disparoneura apicalis
- Disparoneura canningi
- Disparoneura quadrimaculata
- Disparoneura ramajana
- Drepanoneura donnellyi
- Drepanoneura janirae
- Drepanoneura letitia
- Drepanoneura loutoni
- Drepanoneura muzoni
- Drepanoneura peruviensis
- Drepanoneura tennesseni
- Elattoneura acuta
- Elattoneura analis
- Elattoneura atkinsoni
- Elattoneura aurantiaca
- Elattoneura balli
- Elattoneura bigemmata
- Elattoneura caesia
- Elattoneura campioni
- Elattoneura centrafricana
- Elattoneura centralis
- Elattoneura coomansi
- Elattoneura dorsalis
- Elattoneura erythromma
- Elattoneura frenulata
- Elattoneura girardi
- Elattoneura glauca
- Elattoneura josemorai
- Elattoneura leucostigma
- Elattoneura lliba
- Elattoneura longispina
- Elattoneura mayombensis
- Elattoneura morini
- Elattoneura nigerrima
- Elattoneura nigra
- Elattoneura nihari
- Elattoneura pasquinii
- Elattoneura pluotae
- Elattoneura pruinosa
- Elattoneura souteri
- Elattoneura tenax
- Elattoneura tetrica
- Elattoneura tropicalis
- Elattoneura vrijdaghi
- Epipleoneura albuquerquei
- Epipleoneura capilliformis
- Epipleoneura demarmelsi
- Epipleoneura fernandezi
- Epipleoneura fuscaenea
- Epipleoneura haroldoi
- Epipleoneura humeralis
- Epipleoneura janirae
- Epipleoneura kaxuriana
- Epipleoneura lamina
- Epipleoneura machadoi
- Epipleoneura manauensis
- Epipleoneura metallica
- Epipleoneura ocuene
- Epipleoneura pallida
- Epipleoneura pereirai
- Epipleoneura protostictoides
- Epipleoneura solitaria
- Epipleoneura spatulata
- Epipleoneura tariana
- Epipleoneura uncinata
- Epipleoneura venezuelensis
- Epipleoneura waiwaiana
- Epipleoneura westfalli
- Epipleoneura williamsoni
- Epipotoneura machadoi
- Epipotoneura nehalennia
- Esme cyaneovittata
- Esme longistyla
- Esme mudiensis
- Forcepsioneura ephippigera
- Forcepsioneura garrisoni
- Forcepsioneura grossiorum
- Forcepsioneura haerteli
- Forcepsioneura itatiaiae
- Forcepsioneura juruaensis
- Forcepsioneura lucia
- Forcepsioneura sancta
- Forcepsioneura westfalli
- Idioneura ancilla
- Idioneura celioi
- Isomecocnemis cellularis
- Isomecocnemis cyanura
- Isomecocnemis subnodalis
- Junix elumbis
- Lamproneura lucerna
- Melanoneura bilineata
- Neoneura aaroni
- Neoneura amelia
- Neoneura anaclara
- Neoneura angelensis
- Neoneura bilinearis
- Neoneura carnatica
- Neoneura cristina
- Neoneura denticulata
- Neoneura desana
- Neoneura esthera
- Neoneura ethela
- Neoneura fluvicollis
- Neoneura gaida
- Neoneura joana
- Neoneura jurzitzai
- Neoneura kiautai
- Neoneura leonardoi
- Neoneura lucas
- Neoneura luzmarina
- Neoneura maria
- Neoneura mariana
- Neoneura moorei
- Neoneura myrthea
- Neoneura paya
- Neoneura rubriventris
- Neoneura rufithorax
- Neoneura schreiberi
- Neoneura sylvatica
- Neoneura waltheri
- Nososticta africana
- Nososticta astrolabica
- Nososticta atrocyana
- Nososticta aurantiaca
- Nososticta baroalba
- Nososticta beatrix
- Nososticta callisphaena
- Nososticta chalybeostoma
- Nososticta circumscripta
- Nososticta coelestna
- Nososticta commutata
- Nososticta cyanura
- Nososticta diadesma
- Nososticta dorsonigra
- Nososticta eburnea
- Nososticta egregia
- Nososticta emphyla
- Nososticta erythroprocta
- Nososticta erythrura
- Nososticta evelynae
- Nososticta exul
- Nososticta flavipennis
- Nososticta fonticola
- Nososticta fraterna
- Nososticta insignis
- Nososticta irene
- Nososticta kalumburu
- Nososticta koolpinyah
- Nososticta koongarra
- Nososticta liveringa
- Nososticta lorentzi
- Nososticta marina
- Nososticta melanoxantha
- Nososticta moluccensis
- Nososticta nigrifrons
- Nososticta nigrofasciata
- Nososticta phoenissa
- Nososticta pilbara
- Nososticta plagiata
- Nososticta plagioxantha
- Nososticta pseudexul
- Nososticta pyroprocta
- Nososticta rangifera
- Nososticta rosea
- Nososticta salomonis
- Nososticta selysi
- Nososticta silvicola
- Nososticta solida
- Nososticta solitaria
- Nososticta tarcumbi
- Nososticta thalassina
- Nososticta wallacii
- Nososticta xanthe
- Peristicta aeneoviridis
- Peristicta forceps
- Peristicta gauchae
- Peristicta jalmosi
- Peristicta janiceae
- Peristicta lizeria
- Peristicta muzoni
- Phasmoneura exigua
- Phasmoneura janirae
- Phylloneura westermanni
- Prodasineura abbreviata
- Prodasineura auricolor
- Prodasineura autumnalis
- Prodasineura coerulescens
- Prodasineura collaris
- Prodasineura croconota
- Prodasineura delicatula
- Prodasineura doisuthepensis
- Prodasineura dorsalis
- Prodasineura flammula
- Prodasineura flavifacies
- Prodasineura gracillima
- Prodasineura haematostoma
- Prodasineura hanzhongensis
- Prodasineura hosei
- Prodasineura hyperythra
- Prodasineura incerta
- Prodasineura integra
- Prodasineura interrupta
- Prodasineura laidlawii
- Prodasineura lansbergei
- Prodasineura longjingensis
- Prodasineura nigra
- Prodasineura notostigma
- Prodasineura obsoleta
- Prodasineura odoneli
- Prodasineura odzalae
- Prodasineura palawana
- Prodasineura peramoena
- Prodasineura perisi
- Prodasineura quadristigma
- Prodasineura sita
- Prodasineura tenebricosa
- Prodasineura theebawi
- Prodasineura verticalis
- Prodasineura villiersi
- Prodasineura vittata
- Proneura prolongata
- Protoneura ailsa
- Protoneura amatoria
- Protoneura aurantiaca
- Protoneura calverti
- Protoneura capillaris
- Protoneura cara
- Protoneura corculum
- Protoneura cupida
- Protoneura dunklei
- Protoneura klugi
- Protoneura macintyrei
- Protoneura paucinervis
- Protoneura peramans
- Protoneura rojiza
- Protoneura romanae
- Protoneura sanguinipes
- Protoneura scintilla
- Protoneura sulfurata
- Protoneura tenuis
- Protoneura viridis
- Protoneura woytkowskii
- Psaironeura bifurcata
- Psaironeura remissa
- Psaironeura selvatica
- Psaironeura tenuissima
- Roppaneura beckeri
