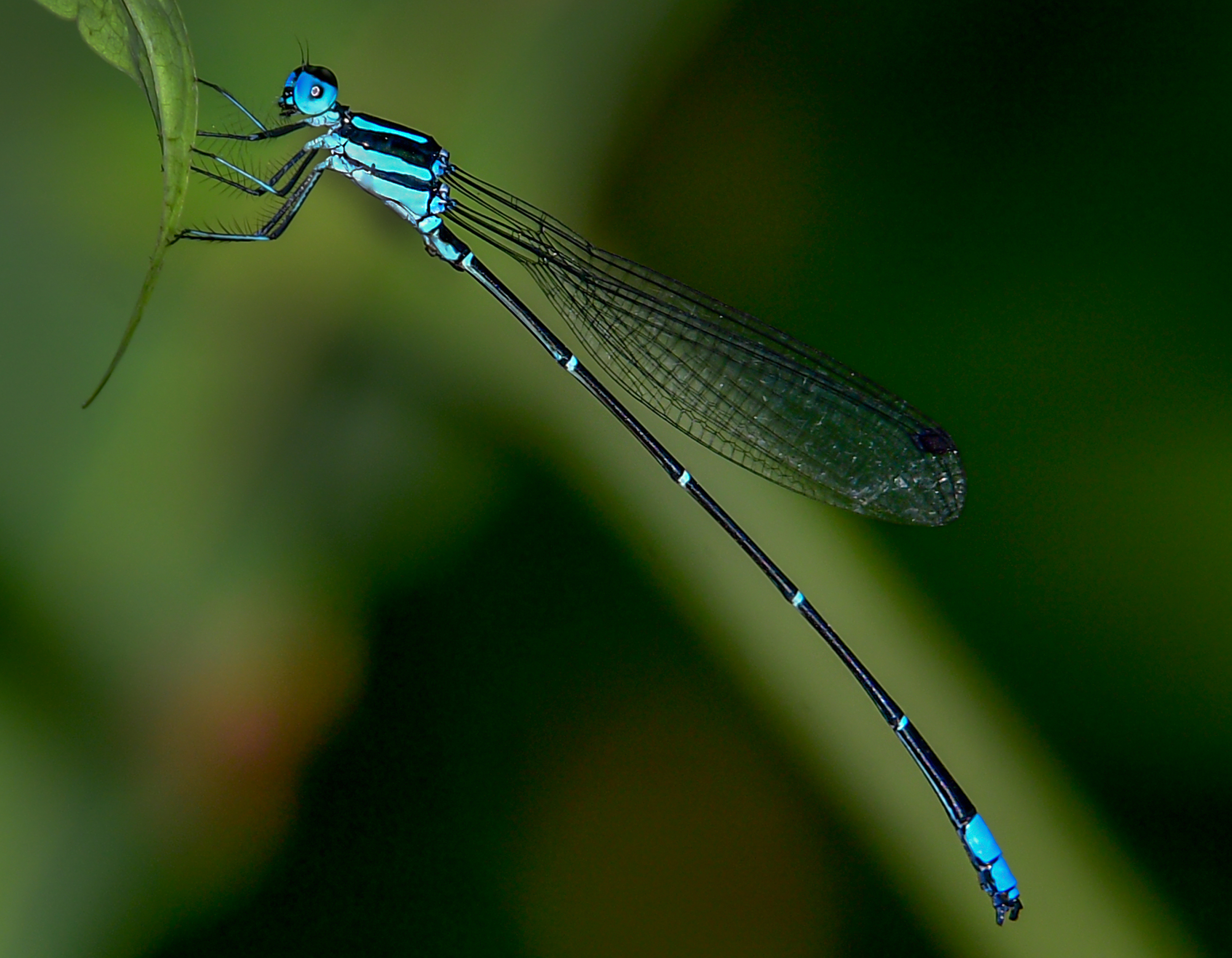
- Male

Conservation status
- Least Concern (IUCN 3.1)

Scientific classification
- Kingdom: Animalia
- Phylum: Arthropoda
- Clade: Pancrustacea
- Class: Insecta
- Order: Odonata
- Suborder: Zygoptera
- Family: Platycnemididae
- Subfamily: Disparoneurinae
- Genus: Esme
- Species: E. longistyla

Binomial name
- Esme longistyla Fraser, 1931

= Esme longistyla =

Species of insect

Esme longistyla is damselfly in the family Platycnemididae. It is commonly known as the Nilgiri bambootail. It is endemic to Western Ghats in India.

== Description ==
It is medium-sized damselfly with about abdomen 42–44 millimetres (1.7–1.7 in) and hindwings about 28–29 millimetres (1.1–1.1 in) with black-capped blue eyes. Its thorax is velvet-black on dorsum and azure blue on sides. The dorsum is marked with narrow ante-humeral blue stripes. There is another moderately broad black stripe over the postero-lateral suture. The base of the sides are pale blue. The under side of the thorax is greenish yellow or blue. The legs of the males are black. The abdomen is long and slender. The first and 8–10 segments on the abdomen are azure blue. The second segment of the damselfly is black with board irregular azure blue stripes on sides of abdomen. The segments from 3–7 are black with azure blue rings at the end of each segment. The segments 8 to 10 are azure blue; but the sides of segment 10 and apical border are narrowly black. Anal appendages are black. Females are similar to males; but more robustly build.

It is considerably smaller than Esme cyaneovittata and Esme mudiensis, the only two other known species of the genus in Western Ghats. It differs from E. cyaneovittata by the shape of the anal appendages, the anterior lobe of the prothorax being wholly blue and the hind pair of legs marked with blue. It can be distinguished from E. mudiensis by the labrum blue, bordered with black.

== Habitat ==
The species is found perching on overhanging vegetation over torrential forest streams. It breeds in forest streams.

== See also ==
- List of odonates of India
- List of odonata of Kerala
