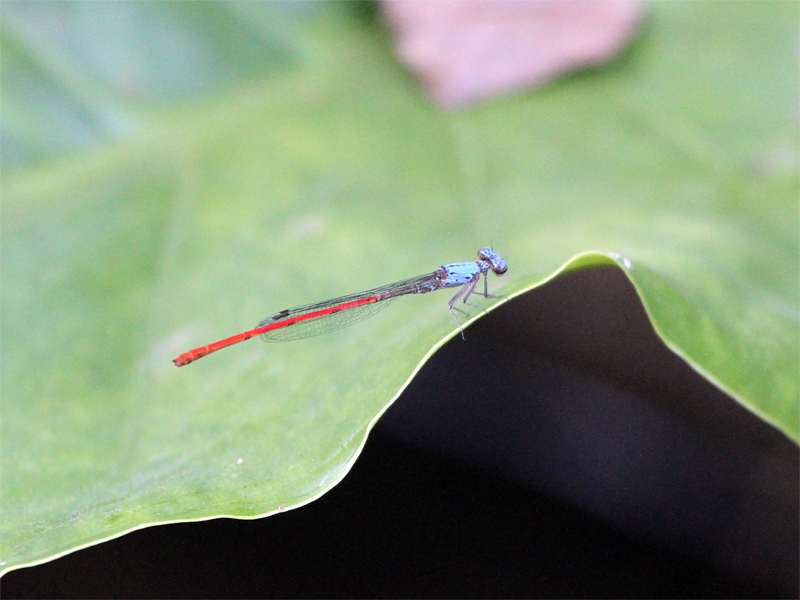
- Neoneura sylvatica

Scientific classification
- Kingdom: Animalia
- Phylum: Arthropoda
- Clade: Pancrustacea
- Class: Insecta
- Order: Odonata
- Suborder: Zygoptera
- Family: Protoneuridae
- Genus: Neoneura; Selys, 1860

= Neoneura =

Genus of damselflies

Neoneura is a genus of damselfly in the family Protoneuridae. They are found in the Neotropics, from Cuba and Texas to Argentina.

== Characteristics ==
Though part of the family Protoneuridae, the abdomen of neoneurans, in contrast to that of protoneurans, is no more slender than that of pond damselflies. Males are mostly brightly coloured with red, orange, yellow and blue predominating, but females are less showy. The females do not bend their relatively short abdomens when laying eggs as do protoneurans. Pairs of these damselfly can be seen in tandem over quiet waters at the edges of lakes. The eggs are laid among floating wood chippings or on emergent plant stems, the male remaining in tandem with the female while ovipositing takes place.

== Species ==
The genus contains the following species:

- Neoneura aaroni Calvert, 1903 - Coral-fronted Threadtail
- Neoneura amelia Calvert, 1903 - Amelia's Threadtail
- Neoneura anaclara Machado, 2006
- Neoneura angelensis Juillerat, 2007
- Neoneura bilinearis Selys, 1860
- Neoneura carnatica Hagen in Selys, 1886 - Orange-sided Threadtail, Tiger Threadtail
- Neoneura cristina Rácenis, 1955
- Neoneura confundens Wasscher & Van 't Bosch, 2013
- Neoneura denticulata Williamson, 1917
- Neoneura desana Machado, 1989
- Neoneura esthera Williamson, 1917
- Neoneura ethela Williamson, 1917
- Neoneura fulvicollis Selys, 1886
- Neoneura gaida Rácenis, 1953
- Neoneura joana Williamson, 1917
- Neoneura jurzitzai Garrison, 1999
- Neoneura kiautai Machado, 2007
- Neoneura leonardoi Machado, 2006
- Neoneura lucas Machado, 2002
- Neoneura luzmarina De Marmels, 1989
- Neoneura maria (Scudder, 1866) - Cuban Blue Threadtail
- Neoneura mariana Williamson, 1917
- Neoneura moorei Machado, 2003
- Neoneura myrthea Williamson, 1917
- Neoneura paya Calvert, 1907
- Neoneura rubriventris Selys, 1860
- Neoneura rufithorax Selys, 1886
- Neoneura schreiberi Machado, 1975
- Neoneura sylvatica Hagen in Selys, 1886
- Neoneura waltheri Selys, 1886
