= Microneura =

Scientific classification
- Kingdom: Animalia
- Phylum: Arthropoda
- Clade: Pancrustacea
- Class: Insecta
- Order: Odonata
- Suborder: Zygoptera
- Family: Coenagrionidae
- Genus: Microneura

Genus of dragonflies

Up until recently Microneura had been a genus of dragonfly in the family Coenagrionidae. It contained the following species:

- Microneura caligata

That species is now known as Protoneura caligata
