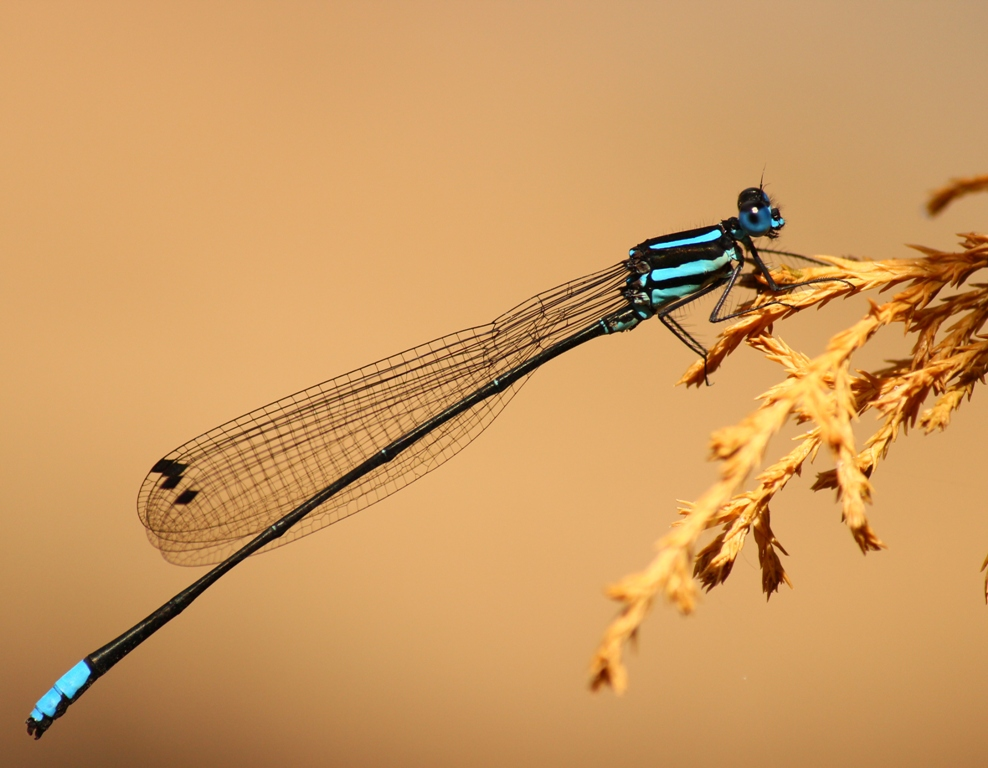
- Male

Conservation status
- Data Deficient (IUCN 3.1)

Scientific classification
- Kingdom: Animalia
- Phylum: Arthropoda
- Clade: Pancrustacea
- Class: Insecta
- Order: Odonata
- Suborder: Zygoptera
- Family: Platycnemididae
- Subfamily: Disparoneurinae
- Genus: Esme
- Species: E. cyaneovittata

Binomial name
- Esme cyaneovittata Fraser, 1922

= Esme cyaneovittata =

Species of damselfly

Esme cyaneovittata is damselfly in the family Platycnemididae. It is endemic to Western Ghats in India, south of Palakkad Gap.

== Description and habitat ==
It is a medium-sized damselfly with black-capped blue eyes. Its thorax is velvet-black on dorsum and azure blue on sides. The dorsum is marked with narrow ante-humeral blue stripes. There is another moderately broad black stripe over the postero-lateral suture. The base of the sides is pale blue. Wings are transparent with black pterostigma. Abdomen is black, marked with azure blue on segment 1 and 2. Segments 3 to 7 have very narrow baso-dorsal annules. Segments 8 to 10 are blue. The apical border of 10 and the ventral borders of all segments are broadly black. Anal appendages are black. Female is similar to the male; but more robustly build.

It can be distinguished from Esme mudiensis from its labrum marked with blue. From Esme longistyla, it can be distinguished by its black legs unmarked with blue, by its stout inferior anal appendages, and by the broken blue lateral stripe on the thorax.

It is found along hill streams, commonly found in colonies like those of Caconeura gomphoides.

== See also ==
- List of odonates of India
- List of odonata of Kerala
