= Elattoneura oculata =

Conservation status
- Vulnerable (IUCN 3.1)

Scientific classification
- Kingdom: Animalia
- Phylum: Arthropoda
- Class: Insecta
- Order: Odonata
- Suborder: Zygoptera
- Family: Platycnemididae
- Genus: Elattoneura
- Species: E. oculata

Binomial name
- Elattoneura oculata (Kirby, 1894)

Synonyms
- Elattoneura bigemmata Lieftinck, 1971

Species of insect

Elattoneura oculata is a species of damselfly in the family Platycnemididae known commonly as the two-spotted threadtail. It is endemic to Sri Lanka, where it is a rare species known from a few locations in the southern and central parts of the island. It lives along streams in primary rainforest habitat, an ecosystem threatened by habitat destruction and degradation.
