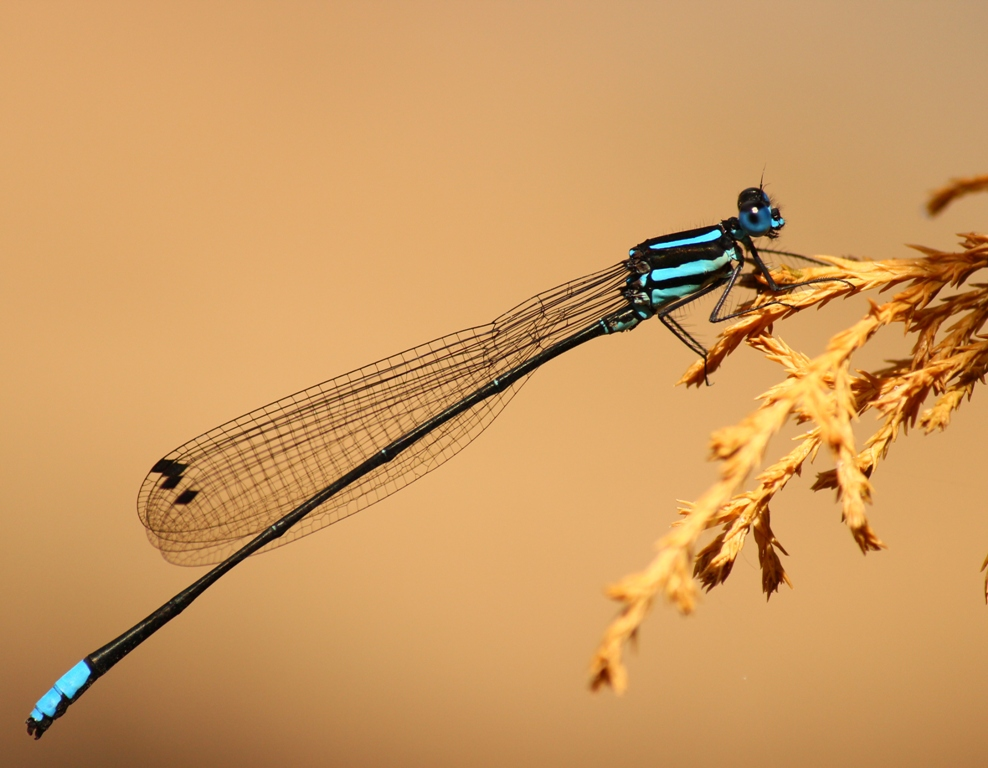
- Esme cyaneovittata

Scientific classification
- Kingdom: Animalia
- Phylum: Arthropoda
- Clade: Pancrustacea
- Class: Insecta
- Order: Odonata
- Suborder: Zygoptera
- Family: Platycnemididae
- Subfamily: Disparoneurinae
- Genus: Esme; Fraser, 1922

= Esme (damselfly) =

Genus of damselflies

Esme is a genus of damselflies in the family Platycnemididae. This genus has three species. The following are the species:

- Esme cyaneovittata
- Esme longistyla (Nilgiri bambootail)
- Esme mudiensis
