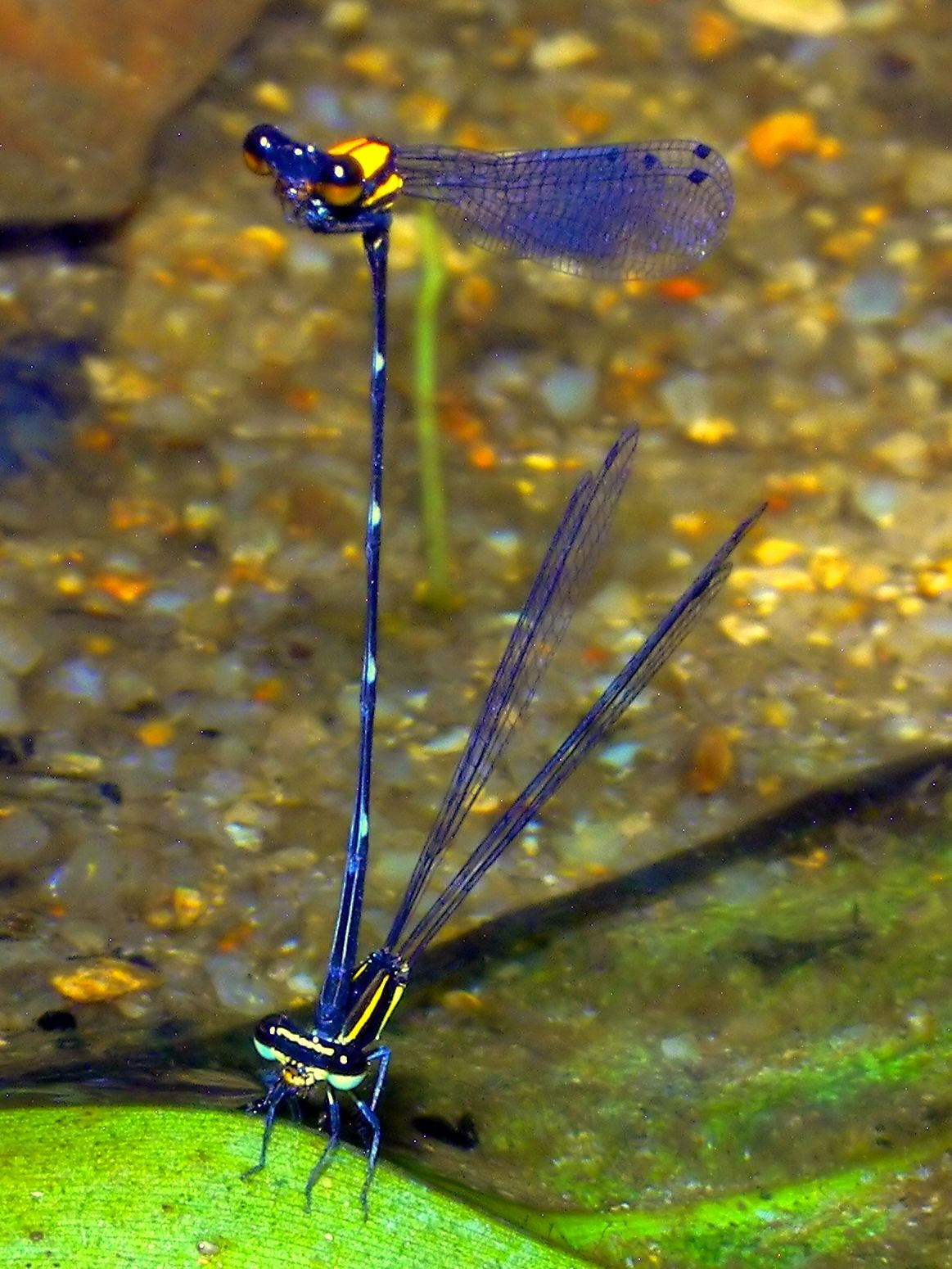
- Prodasineura croconota

Scientific classification
- Kingdom: Animalia
- Phylum: Arthropoda
- Class: Insecta
- Order: Odonata
- Suborder: Zygoptera
- Family: Platycnemididae
- Genus: Prodasineura; Cowley, 1934

= Prodasineura =

Genus of damselflies

Prodasineura, the Asian threadtails, is a genus of damselflies in the family Platycnemididae. All the Afrotropical species formerly in this genus are now placed in Elattoneura, the African threadtails. Dijkstra et al. (2014) moved the genus (and related Elattoneura) from Protoneuridae to Platycnemididae based on molecular phylogenetic research.

== Description ==
These are delicately built damselflies, with very wide heads. The males have starkly contrasting colours, typically a black body that is striped in blue, red or yellow. The colour pattern on the male's synthorax (which carries the wings) and tip of his abdomen, in combination with the shape of the four terminal appendages (the cerci and paraprocts, or male claspers for copulation) are useful features when distinguishing species in the genus. The cerci are generally hammer-like with a pointed apex, while the broad paraprocts taper abruptly towards a rounded tip. While females are broadly similar to males, details of their well-developed prothorax facilitate separation of species.

== Habitats ==
Some are found along fast-flowing streams, while others conversely prefer streams flowing slowly over sandy substrates. Some occur at open streams in secondary forest or the tributaries of lowland rivers.

== Species ==
It contains the following species:

- Prodasineura abbreviata Lieftinck, 1951
- Prodasineura auricolor (Fraser, 1927)
- Prodasineura autumnalis (Fraser, 1922) – Black threadtail
- Prodasineura coerulescens (Fraser, 1932)
- Prodasineura collaris (Selys, 1860)
- Prodasineura croconota Ris, 1916
- Prodasineura delicatula (Lieftinck, 1930)
- Prodasineura doisuthepensis Hoess, 2007
- Prodasineura dorsalis (Selys, 1860)
- Prodasineura flammula Lieftinck, 1948
- Prodasineura flavifacies Pinhey, 1981
- Prodasineura fujianensis Xu, 2006
- Prodasineura gracillima (Selys, 1886)
- Prodasineura haematosoma Lieftinck, 1937
- Prodasineura hanzhongensis Yang & Li, 1995
- Prodasineura hosei (Laidlaw, 1913)
- Prodasineura hyperythra (Selys, 1886)
- Prodasineura incerta Pinhey, 1962
- Prodasineura integra (Selys, 1882)
- Prodasineura interrupta (Selys, 1860)
- Prodasineura laidlawii (Förster in Laidlaw, 1907)
- Prodasineura lansbergei (Selys, 1886)
- Prodasineura longjingensis (Zhou, 1981)
- Prodasineura nigra (Fraser, 1922)
- Prodasineura notostigma (Selys, 1860)
- Prodasineura obsoleta (Selys, 1882)
- Prodasineura odoneli (Fraser, 1924)
- Prodasineura odzalae Aguesse, 1966)
- Prodasineura palawana Lieftinck, 1948
- Prodasineura peramoena (Laidlaw, 1913)
- Prodasineura perisi Compte Sart, 1964
- Prodasineura quadristigma Lieftinck, 1951
- Prodasineura sita (Kirby, 1893)
- Prodasineura tenebricosa Lieftinck, 1937
- Prodasineura theebawi (Fraser, 1922)
- Prodasineura verticalis (Selys, 1860) – Black bambootail
- Prodasineura villiersi Fraser, 1948 – White-fronted threadtail
- Prodasineura vittata (Selys, 1886) – Orange-fronted threadtail
