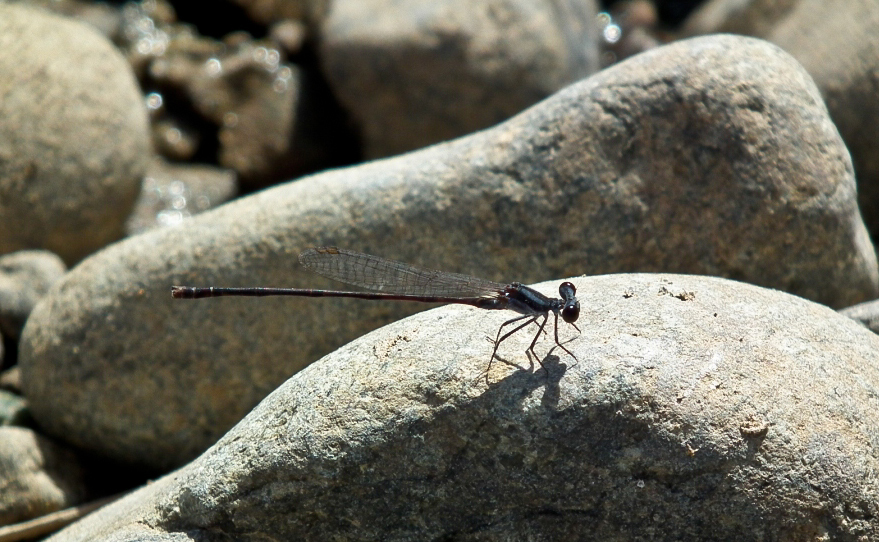
- Arabineura khalidi

Scientific classification
- Kingdom: Animalia
- Phylum: Arthropoda
- Clade: Pancrustacea
- Class: Insecta
- Order: Odonata
- Suborder: Zygoptera
- Family: Platycnemididae
- Subfamily: Disparoneurinae
- Genus: Arabineura; Schneider & Dumont, 1995

Species
- Arabineura khalidi (Schneider, 1988)

= Arabineura =

Genus of damselflies

Arabineura is a genus of damselfly in the family Platycnemididae. It contains the following species:

- Arabineura khalidi
