= Elattoneura pasquinii =

Conservation status
- Vulnerable (IUCN 3.1)

Scientific classification
- Kingdom: Animalia
- Phylum: Arthropoda
- Class: Insecta
- Order: Odonata
- Suborder: Zygoptera
- Family: Platycnemididae
- Genus: Elattoneura
- Species: E. pasquinii

Binomial name
- Elattoneura pasquinii Consiglio, 1978

Species of damselfly

Elattoneura pasquinii is a species of damselfly in the family Platycnemididae. It is endemic to Ethiopia. It is known from only three sites along streams and rivers.
