= Elattoneura centralis =

Scientific classification
- Kingdom: Animalia
- Phylum: Arthropoda
- Class: Insecta
- Order: Odonata
- Suborder: Zygoptera
- Family: Platycnemididae
- Genus: Elattoneura
- Species: E. centralis

Binomial name
- Elattoneura centralis (Hagen in Selys, 1860)

Species of damselfly

Elattoneura centralis is a species of damselfly in the family Platycnemididae known commonly as the dark-glittering threadtail. It is endemic to Sri Lanka.

== See also ==
- List of odonates of Sri Lanka
