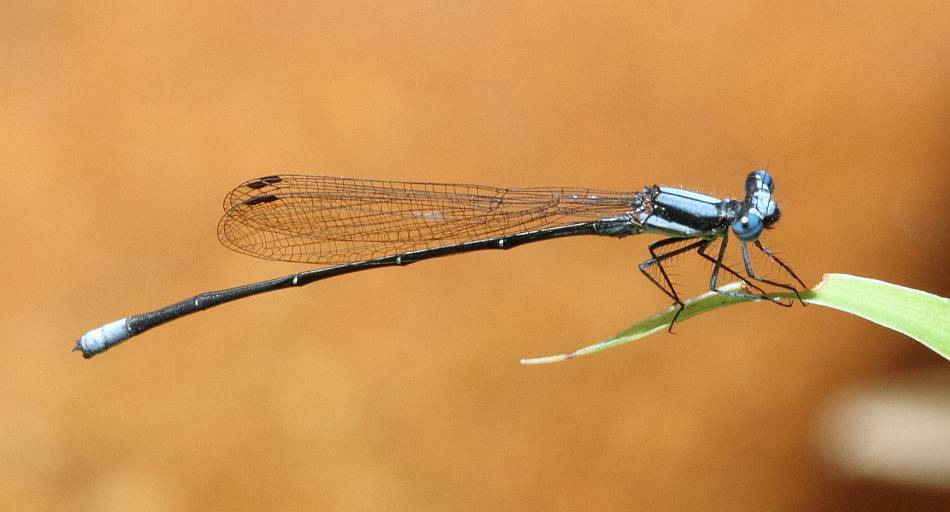
- Elattoneura glauca

Scientific classification
- Kingdom: Animalia
- Phylum: Arthropoda
- Class: Insecta
- Order: Odonata
- Suborder: Zygoptera
- Family: Platycnemididae
- Genus: Elattoneura; Cowley, 1935

= Elattoneura =

Genus of dragonflies

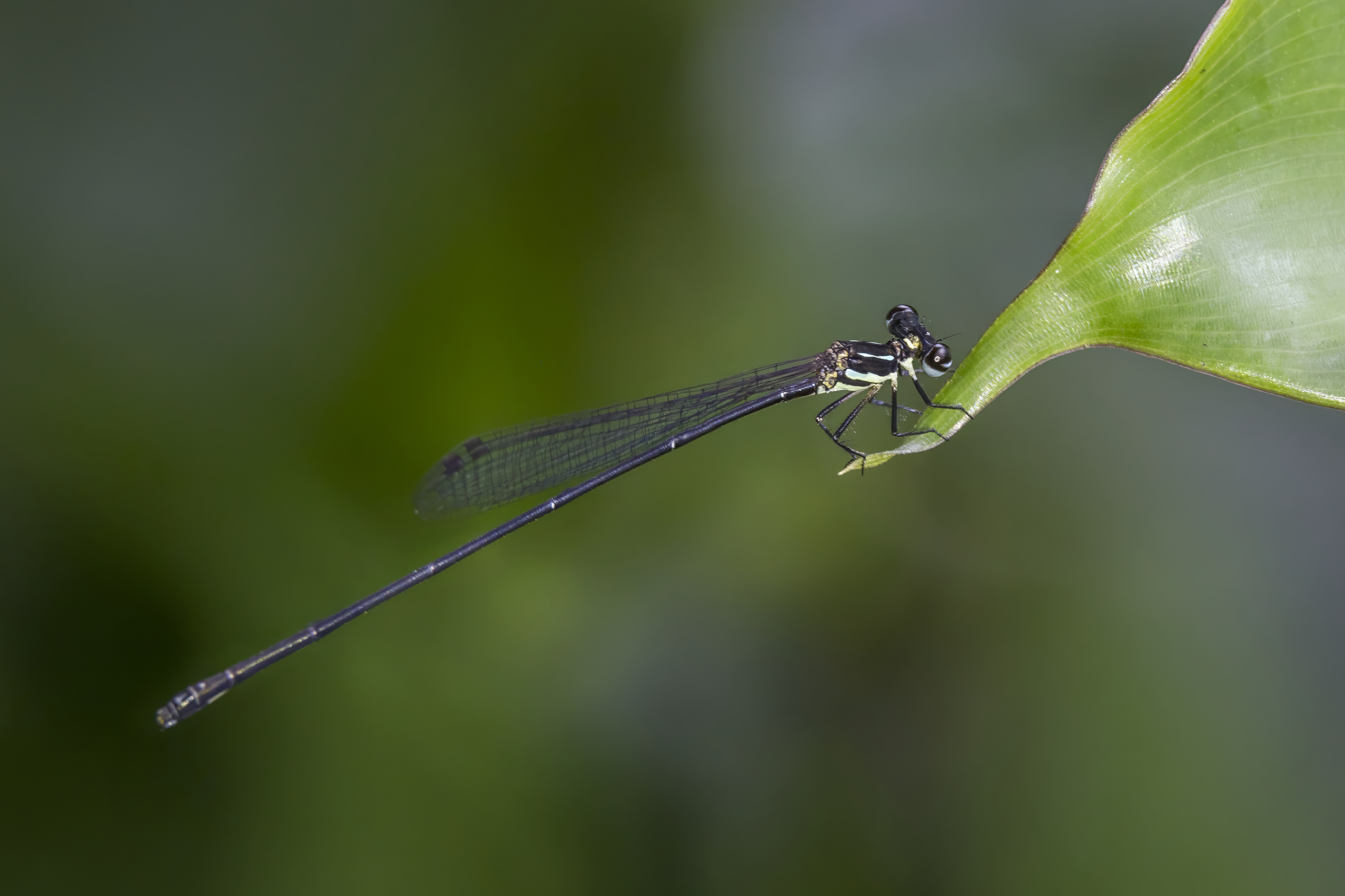
E. villiersi, male, Ghana

Elattoneura, the African threadtails, is a genus of damselflies in the family Platycnemididae. They were formerly placed in genus Prodasineura, but form a distinct clade. The adults are smallish and delicately built damselflies, and their males have very wide heads (cf. Platycnemis and Copera). The adults are typically found in sheltered locations beside or over running water, though a few prefer calmer water with much detritus. There appears to be two groups with differing habitat preferences. Those with pruinose (i.e. frosty grey or white) faces and mostly blue eyes occupy watercourses in open terrain, while those with black or brightly coloured faces are found along forested streams.

== Species ==
There are over 30 species which include:

- Elattoneura acuta
- Elattoneura analis
- Elattoneura atkinsoni
- Elattoneura aurantiaca
- Elattoneura aurifex – goldsmith threadtail
- Elattoneura balli
- Elattoneura caesia – jungle threadtail
- Elattoneura campioni
- Elattoneura cellularis
- Elattoneura centrafricana
- Elattoneura centralis
- Elattoneura coomansi
- Elattoneura dorsalis
- Elattoneura erythromma
- Elattoneura flavifacies
- Elattoneura frenulata – sooty threadtail
- Elattoneura girardi
- Elattoneura glauca – common threadtail, grey threadtail
- Elattoneura josemorai
- Elattoneura khalidi
- Elattoneura lapidaria – rock threadtail
- Elattoneura leucostigma – smoky-winged threadtail
- Elattoneura lliba
- Elattoneura longispina
- Elattoneura mauros
- Elattoneura morini
- Elattoneura nigerrima
- Elattoneura nigra – black threadtail
- Elattoneura nihari
- Elattoneura oculata – two-spotted threadtail
- Elattoneura pasquinii
- Elattoneura pluotae
- Elattoneura pruinosa
- Elattoneura souteri
- Elattoneura tarbotonorum – stout threadtail
- Elattoneura tenax
- Elattoneura tetrica
- Elattoneura villiersi
- Elattoneura vrijdaghi
