= Prodasineura sita =

Scientific classification
- Domain: Eukaryota
- Kingdom: Animalia
- Phylum: Arthropoda
- Class: Insecta
- Order: Odonata
- Suborder: Zygoptera
- Family: Platycnemididae
- Genus: Prodasineura
- Species: P. sita

Binomial name
- Prodasineura sita (Kirby, 1893)

Species of damselfly

Prodasineura sita, the stripe-headed threadtail, is a species of damselfly in the family Platycnemididae. It is endemic to Sri Lanka.

== Sources ==
- Query Results
- Animal diversity web
- Sri Lanka Endemics
- Photos
- List of odonates of Sri Lanka
