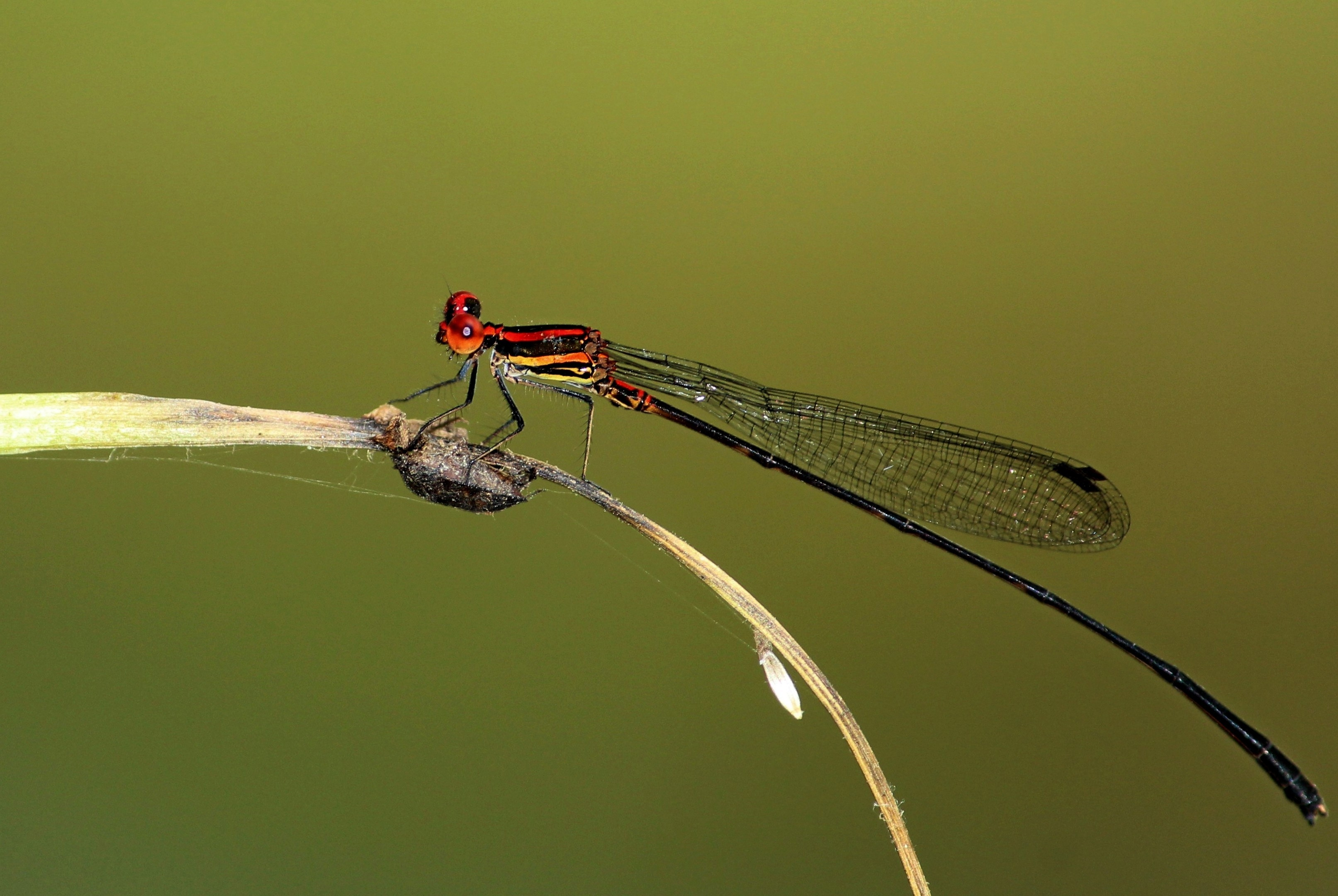
- Male

Conservation status
- Data Deficient (IUCN 3.1)

Scientific classification
- Kingdom: Animalia
- Phylum: Arthropoda
- Clade: Pancrustacea
- Class: Insecta
- Order: Odonata
- Suborder: Zygoptera
- Family: Platycnemididae
- Genus: Elattoneura
- Species: E. souteri

Binomial name
- Elattoneura souteri (Fraser, 1924)

Synonyms
- Disparoneura souteri Fraser, 1924

= Elattoneura souteri =

Species of damselfly

Elattoneura souteri is a damselfly species in the family Platycnemididae. It is endemic to Western Ghats in India.

== Description and habitat ==
It is a medium sized damselfly with reddish-brown eyes, pale greenish beneath. Its thorax is velvet-black, marked with a broad cherry-red humeral stripe. There is another lateral stripe of citron-yellow in the first lateral suture and cherry-red in anterior follows it. The hinder half of the metepimeron is yellow. Its abdomen is black with red and yellow marks.

It is found on the banks of submontane streams in Western Ghats, hiding in shaded areas beneath overhanging bamboo, cane or bushes.

== See also ==
- List of odonates of India
- List of odonata of Kerala
