= Protoneura sanguinipes =

Conservation status
- Least Concern (IUCN 3.1)

Scientific classification
- Kingdom: Animalia
- Phylum: Arthropoda
- Class: Insecta
- Order: Odonata
- Suborder: Zygoptera
- Family: Coenagrionidae
- Genus: Protoneura
- Species: P. sanguinipes

Binomial name
- Protoneura sanguinipes Westfall, 1987

Species of damselfly

Protoneura sanguinipes is a species of damselfly in the family Coenagrionidae. It is endemic to the Dominican Republic. Its natural habitats are subtropical or tropical moist lowland forests and rivers. It is threatened by habitat loss.
