= Elattoneura nigra =

Conservation status
- Least Concern (IUCN 3.1)

Scientific classification
- Kingdom: Animalia
- Phylum: Arthropoda
- Class: Insecta
- Order: Odonata
- Suborder: Zygoptera
- Family: Platycnemididae
- Genus: Elattoneura
- Species: E. nigra

Binomial name
- Elattoneura nigra Kimmins, 1938

Species of damselfly

Elattoneura nigra is a species of damselfly in the family Platycnemididae known commonly as the black threadtail. It is native to Central Africa, where it is widespread. It lives along streams and rivers.
