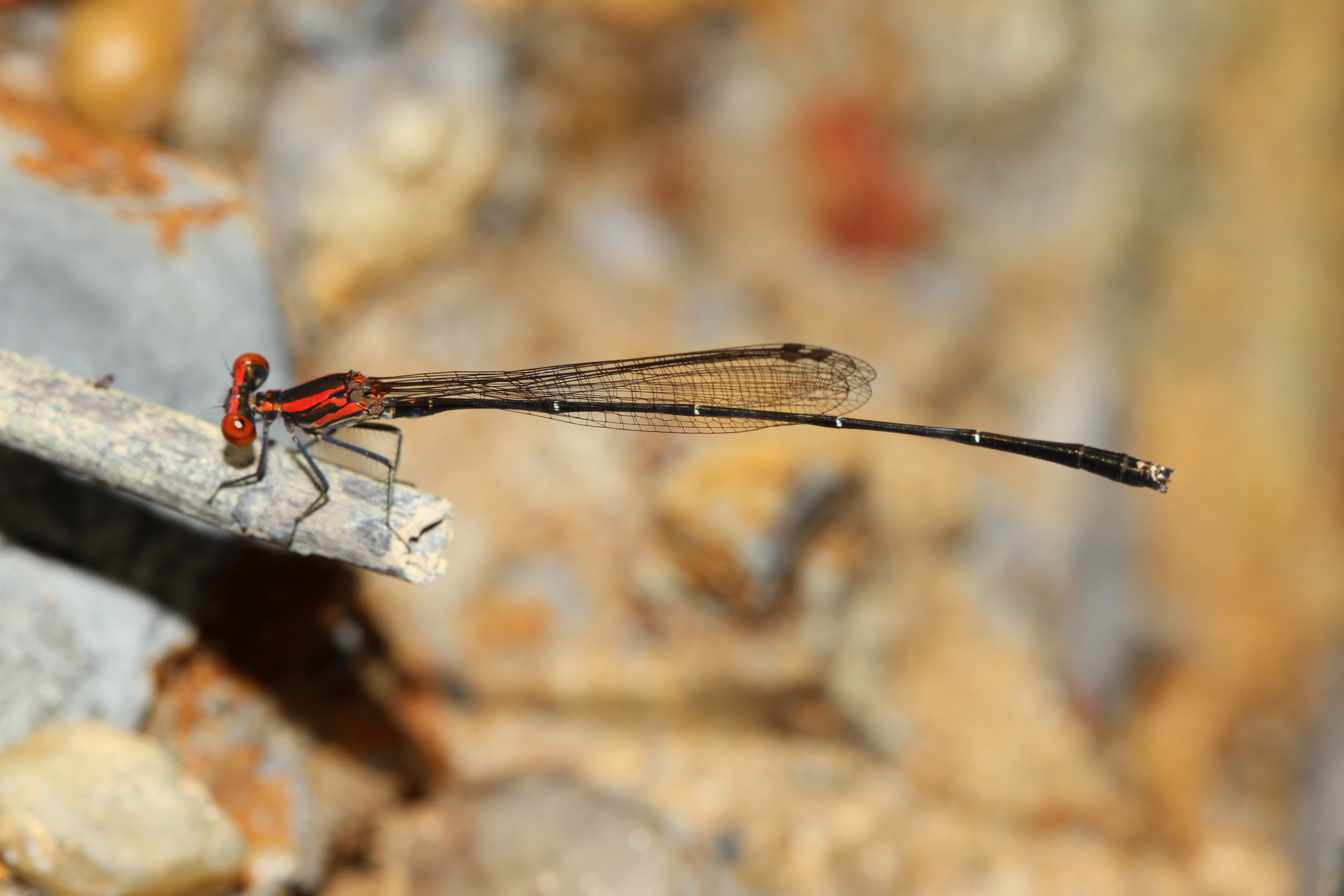
- Male
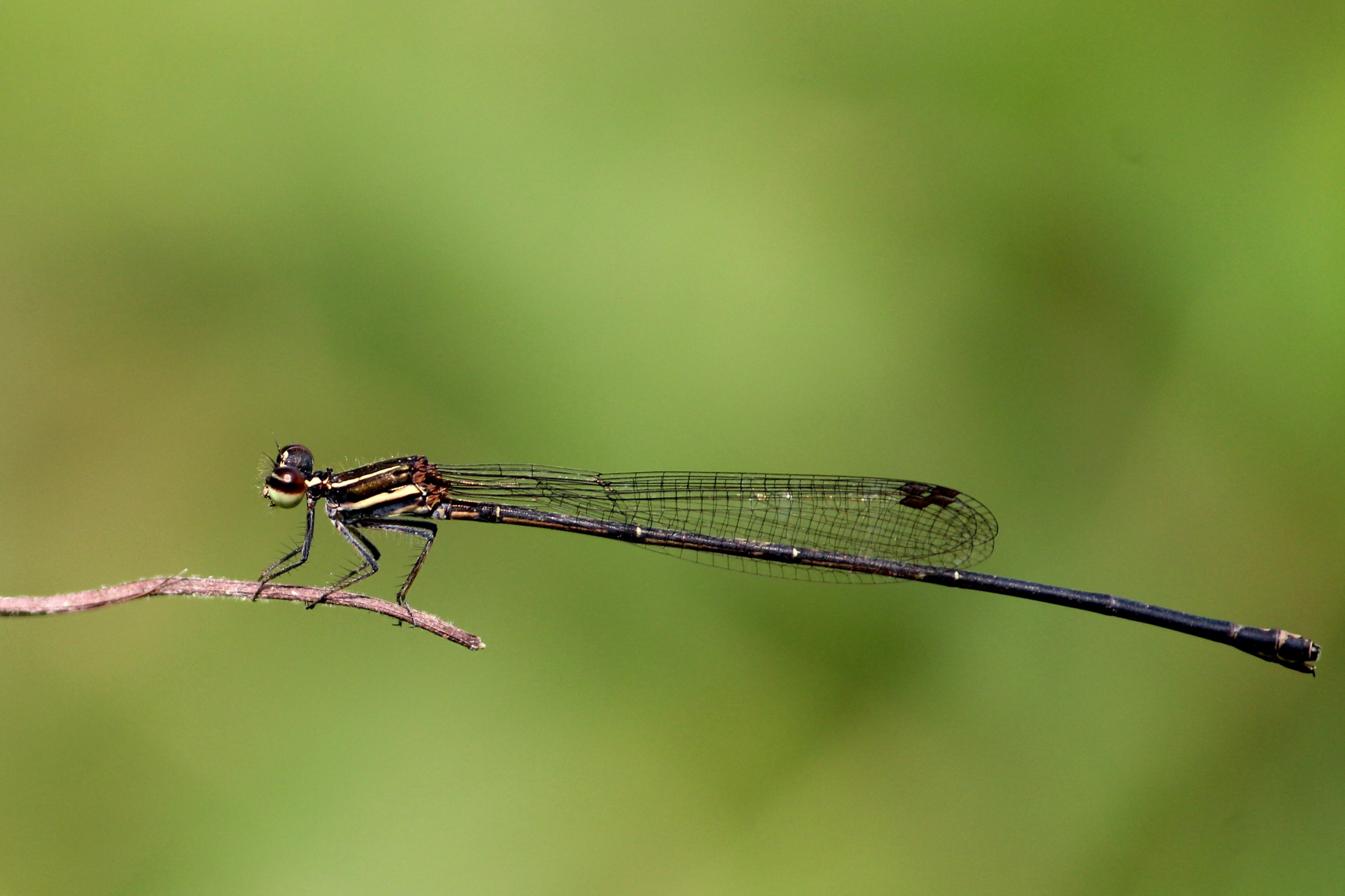
- Female

Conservation status
- Least Concern (IUCN 3.1)

Scientific classification
- Kingdom: Animalia
- Phylum: Arthropoda
- Class: Insecta
- Order: Odonata
- Suborder: Zygoptera
- Family: Platycnemididae
- Genus: Prodasineura
- Species: P. verticalis

Binomial name
- Prodasineura verticalis (Selys, 1860)

Synonyms
- Alloneura verticalis Selys, 1860; Alloneura humeralis Selys, 1860; Disparoneura delia Karsch, 1891; Disparoneura arba Krüger, 1898; Caconeura annandalei Fraser, 1921; Caconeura karnyi Laidlaw, 1926

= Prodasineura verticalis =

Species of damselfly

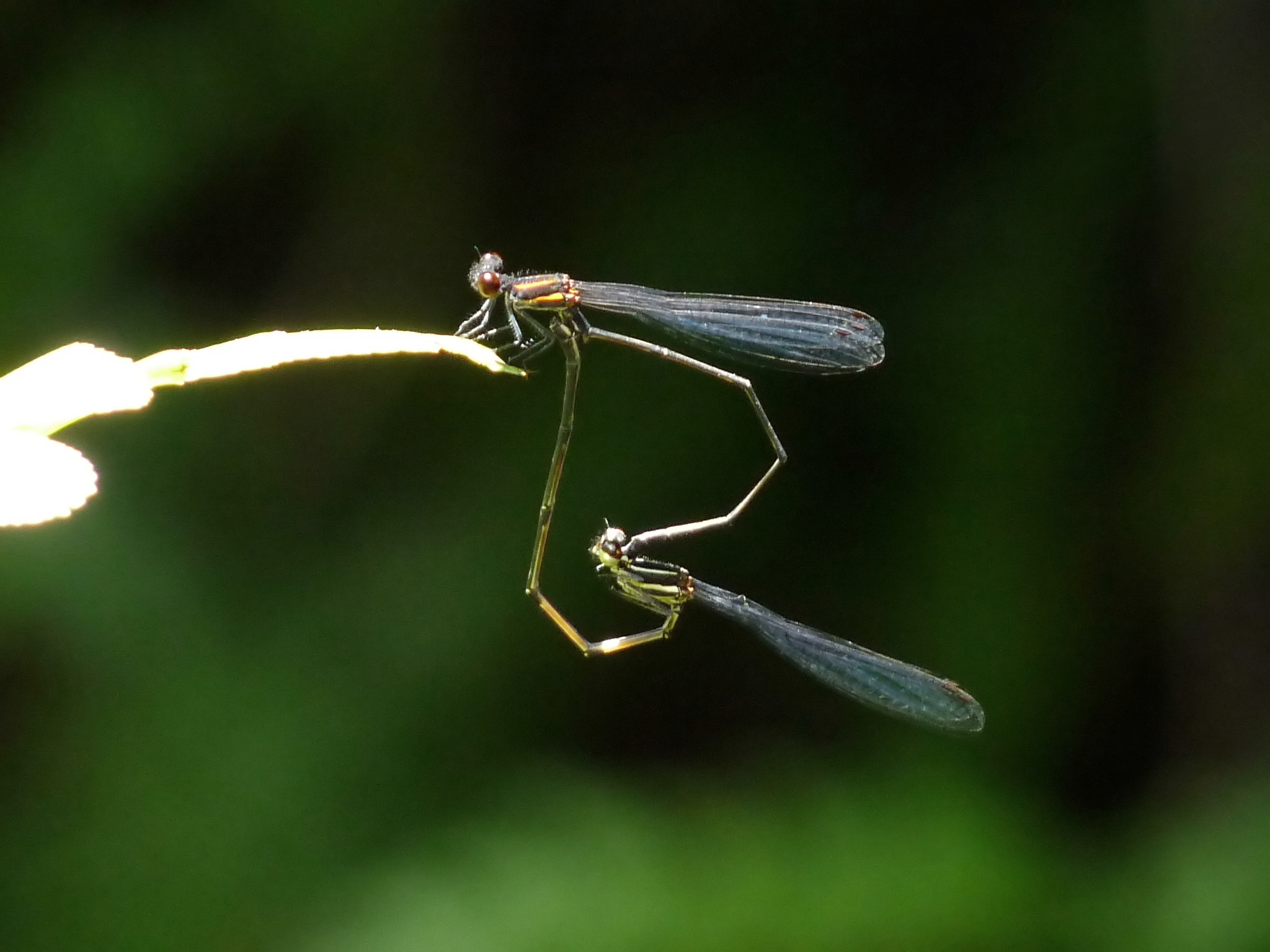
Prodasineura verticalis, mating at Kerala, India

Prodasineura verticalis is a damselfly in the family Platycnemididae. It is commonly known as the red-striped black bambootail or black bambootail.

== Distribution ==
Prodasineura verticalis can be found in these Asian countries, which are China, Guangxi, India, Indonesia, Laos, Malaysia, Peninsular Malaysia Myanmar, Singapore, and Thailand.

== Subspecies ==
This damselfly species has six subspecies. The following are the subspecies.

- Prodasineura verticalis andamanensis (Andaman and Nicobar Islands)
- Prodasineura verticalis annandalei (South India)
- Prodasineura verticalis burmanensis
- Prodasineura verticalis delia
- Prodasineura verticalis humeralis (often treated as a distinct species)
- Prodasineura verticalis verticalis

== Description and habitat ==
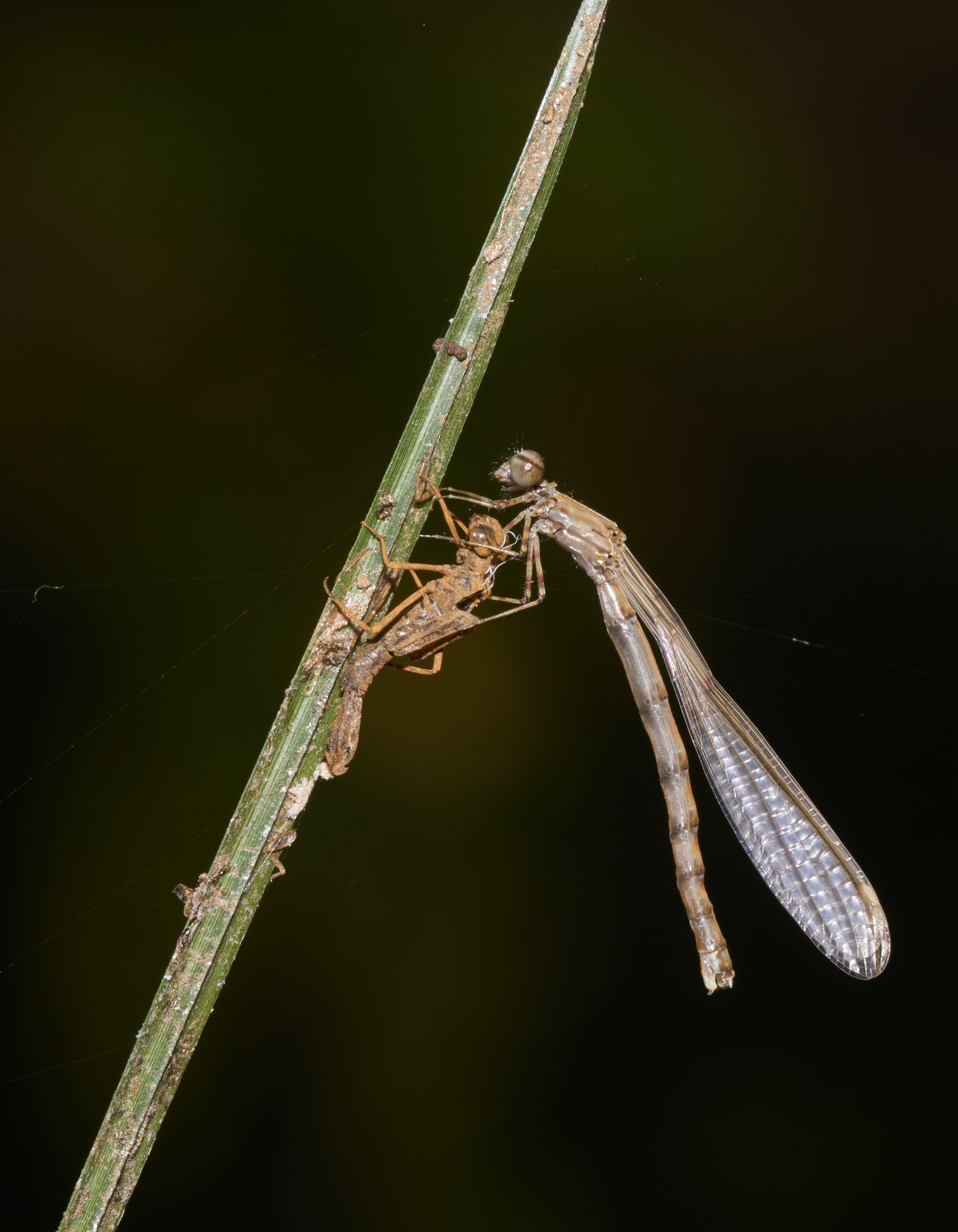
Female emerging from the split skin of the nymph

It is medium size damselfly with black-capped brown eyes. Its hindwings are about 19–20 mm and the abdomen about 30 mm. The male of this damselfly is mostly black with red and yellow stripes on its thorax and small yellow spots on the abdomen. The pterostigma or the wing spot is diamond-shaped and is dark brown in colour. Abdomen is black with segments 3 to 6 have small base-dorsal yellow spots. Remaining segments are unmarked. The female is similarly marked to the male; but the thoracic stripes are paler and more yellowish.

They are commonly found along the banks of large ponds and rivers, usually sitting among emergent water plants. The oviposition takes place on vegetation or on submerged roots in shallow running water, with the pair in tandem.

== See also ==
- List of odonates of India
- List of odonata of Kerala
- Genus Prodasineura damselflies of Borneo Island
