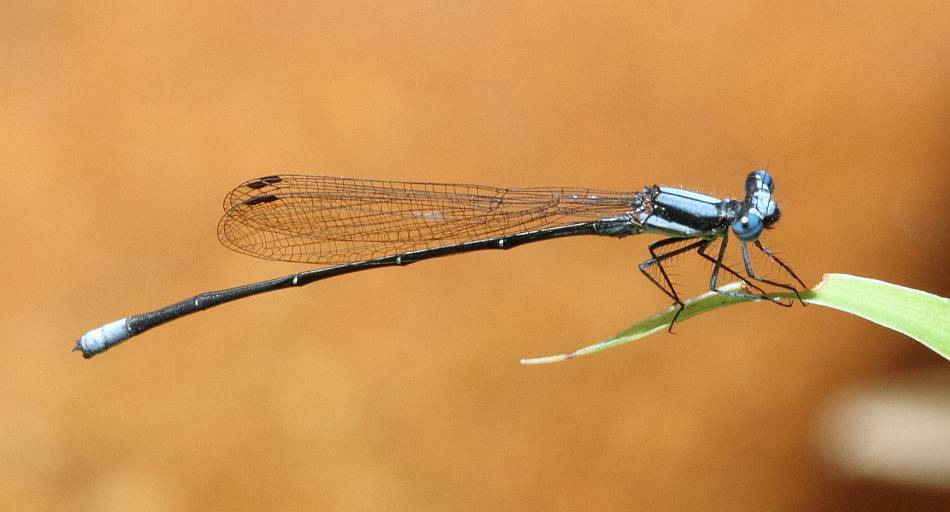
- Male
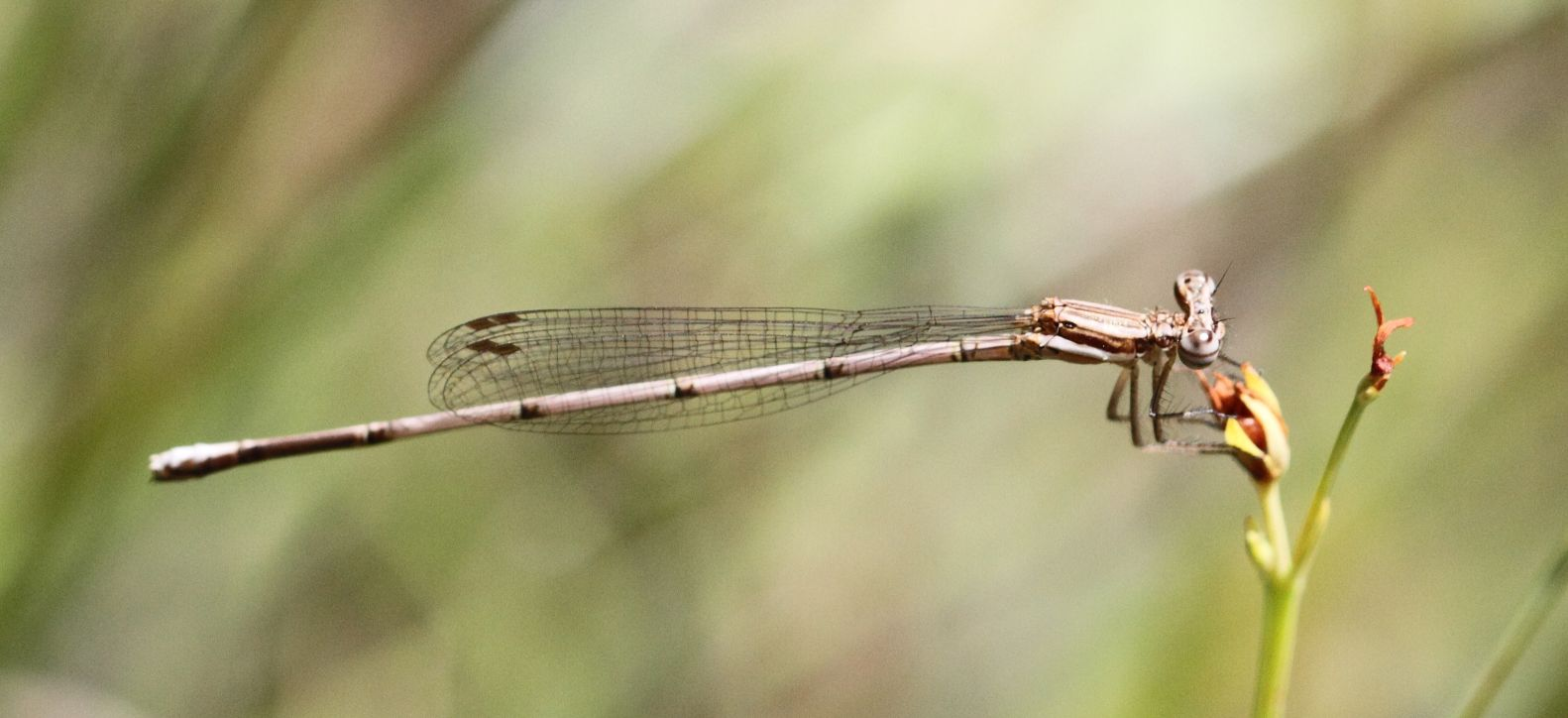
- Female

Conservation status
- Least Concern (IUCN 3.1)

Scientific classification
- Kingdom: Animalia
- Phylum: Arthropoda
- Class: Insecta
- Order: Odonata
- Suborder: Zygoptera
- Family: Platycnemididae
- Genus: Elattoneura
- Species: E. glauca

Binomial name
- Elattoneura glauca (Selys, 1860)

Synonyms
- Disparoneura alba Förster 1906 Disparoneura glauca Selys 1860 Disparoneura mutata Selys 1886 Disparoneura simba Martin 1907 Elattoneura alba (Foerster, 1906) Elattoneura mutata (Selys 1886) Elattoneura simba (Martin 1907)

= Elattoneura glauca =

Species of damselfly

Elattoneura glauca is a species of damselfly in the family Platycnemididae. It is known also as the common threadtail, the grey threadtail or gewone draadstertjie. It is native to the southern half of the African continent, where it is widespread. It lives in shady areas along rivers and streams.

== Description ==
This is a smallish damselfly (wingspan of 40 mm (1.6 in)) which exhibits strong sexual dimorphism. Males have a pale blue thorax with a black lateral stripe. The long, slender abdomen is black, with a while underside, and a pale blue tip. There is a white ring at each joint. The eyes are turquoise.

Females and immature individuals are tan, with a narrow whitish band at each segment. Females have a whitish thorax with thick brown stripes. The eyes are pale and striped with brown bands. They are also larger than the males, with a more robust build. The mottled abdomen is less elongate. Females may easily be confused with Elattoneura frenulata in areas of range overlap.

== Distribution ==
This species is widely distributed across the southern part of the African continent. It is locally common and may occur in large numbers in suitable habitat. It can be found amongst bushes and grass along rivers and streams. It is usually found in shady areas near the water although individuals may be found further away, in thickets. They are mostly associated with slow flowing water.

== Biology ==
This species is sluggish and often reluctant to fly. They are most common in summer, when they are frequently found perched on rocks or plant stems in pairs. While they may persist year round at many sites, they are encountered far less frequently from late autumn through winter.
