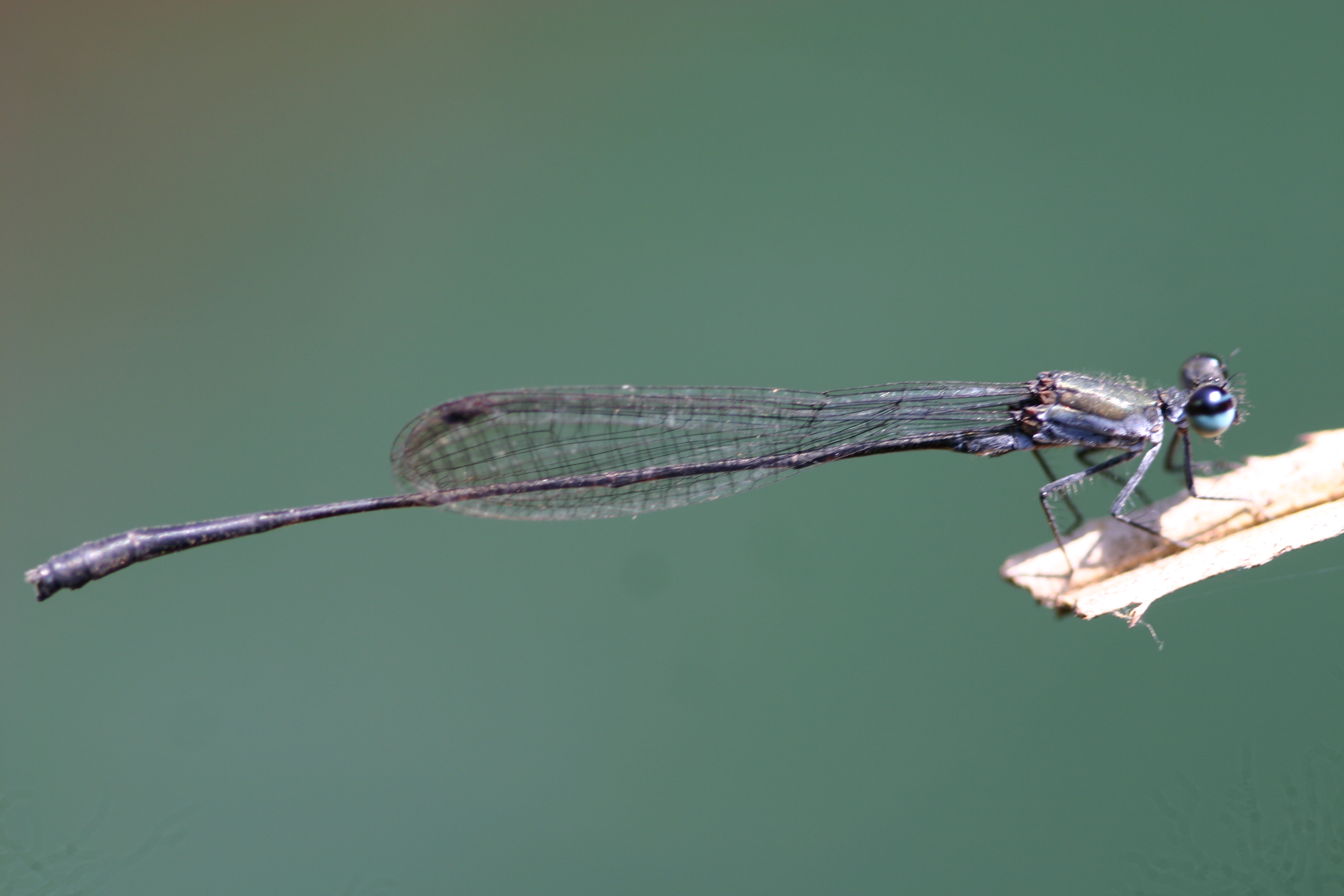
- Male
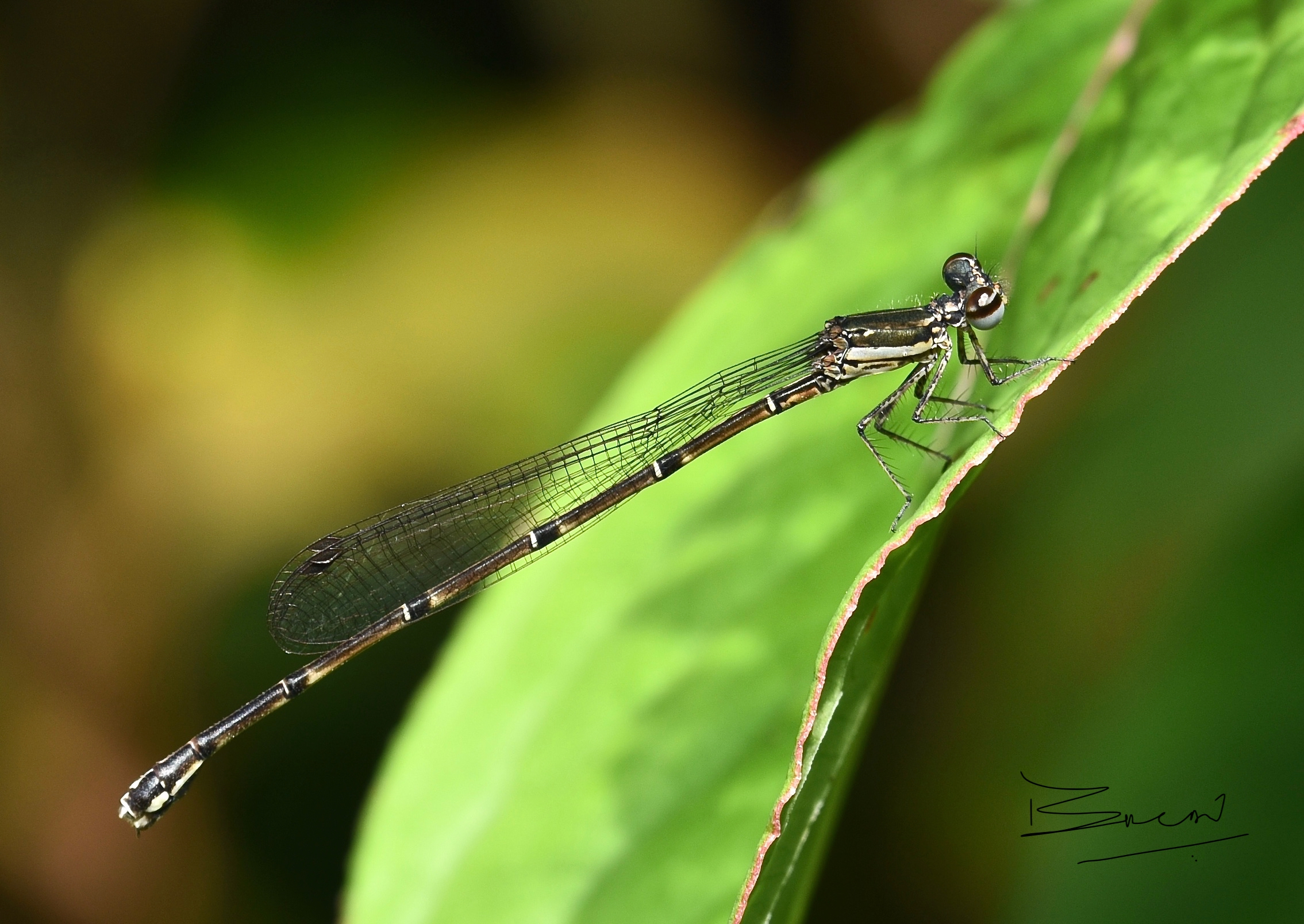
- Female

Conservation status
- Least Concern (IUCN 3.1)

Scientific classification
- Kingdom: Animalia
- Phylum: Arthropoda
- Clade: Pancrustacea
- Class: Insecta
- Order: Odonata
- Suborder: Zygoptera
- Family: Platycnemididae
- Genus: Elattoneura
- Species: E. tetrica

Binomial name
- Elattoneura tetrica (Laidlaw, 1917)

Synonyms
- Disparoneura tetrica Laidlaw, 1917

= Elattoneura tetrica =

Species of damselfly

Elattoneura tetrica, the black and yellow bambootail, is a damselfly species in the family Platycnemididae. It is endemic to Western Ghats in India.

== Description and habitat ==
It is a medium sized damselfly with black-capped pale blue eyes beneath, marked with a black equatorial belt. Its thorax is metallic velvet-black on dorsum. The anterior border of mesepimeron and the lower part of sides are creamy white, separated with a broad stripe in black. The lower part may get pruinosed. Its abdomen is black, pruinosed on the basal segments in adults. Segments 3 to 6 have thin baso-dorsal bluish-white annules. Anal appendages are black.

Female is similar to the male; but paler eyes and dull colored thotax. Teneral males look like the female in colour and markings; adult lose almost all their markings due to pruinescence.

It is closely associated with submontane streams and lakes where it breeds.

== See also ==
- List of odonates of India
- List of odonata of Kerala
