= Neoneura amelia =

Conservation status
- Least Concern (IUCN 3.1)

Scientific classification
- Kingdom: Animalia
- Phylum: Arthropoda
- Class: Insecta
- Order: Odonata
- Suborder: Zygoptera
- Family: Coenagrionidae
- Genus: Neoneura
- Species: N. amelia

Binomial name
- Neoneura amelia Calvert, 1903

Species of damselfly

Neoneura amelia, commonly known as Amelia's threadtail, is a species of damselfly in the family Coenagrionidae. It is native to the southern United States and Central America, its range extending from the southern tip of Texas to Panama.

== Description ==
Neoneura amelia is a small damselfly with a total length of 29 to 35 mm (1.1 to 1.4 in) and a wingspan of 32 to 36 mm (1.3 to 1.4 in). The male has a scarlet head with reddish-brown eyes. The thorax has a scarlet front, thin black dorsal stripe and dull orange sides. The first three segments of the abdomen are reddish-orange and the remaining segments are brown, each with a pale basal portion and blackish apical section. The female is drab and much less noticeable, being pale tan, with black markings on the head and thorax, and dark rings on the abdomen.

== Distribution and habitat ==
Neoneura amelia is native to Central America and the southern tip of the United States. Its range includes southern Texas, ten states in Mexico, Belize, Costa Rica, Guatemala, El Salvador, Honduras, Nicaragua and Panama. Its typical habitat includes the backwaters of large rivers and streams, and the edges of large ponds, including muddy locations. It is present in both wet tropical and subtropical forests and dry forests, as well as grasslands.

== Behavior ==
In Texas, this damselfly is on the wing between April and December. Males are often to be seen hovering over the surface of the water well away from the shore, but they sometimes perch in shrubby vegetation, concealed by overhanging foliage. The females are seldom seen except in the company of males. Eggs are laid while the pair are in tandem on floating wood debris or on the stems of submerged plants, and there are often other threadtails and dancer damselflies seeking to lay in the same locations. Egg-laying is at its peak in the middle of the day and then diminishes.

== Status ==
Neoneura amelia has a wide range and is a common species. The population seems stable and no particular threats have been identified, so the International Union for Conservation of Nature has assessed its conservation status as being of "least concern".
