= Protoneura caligata =

Conservation status
- Endangered (IUCN 3.1)

Scientific classification
- Kingdom: Animalia
- Phylum: Arthropoda
- Clade: Pancrustacea
- Class: Insecta
- Order: Odonata
- Suborder: Zygoptera
- Family: Coenagrionidae
- Genus: Protoneura
- Species: P. caligata

Binomial name
- Protoneura caligata Hagen in Selys, 1886

Species of damselfly

Protoneura caligata is a species of damselfly in the family Protoneuridae. It is endemic to Cuba. Its natural habitats are subtropical or tropical moist lowland forests and rivers. It is threatened by habitat loss.
