= Neoneura maria =

Conservation status
- Data Deficient (IUCN 3.1)

Scientific classification
- Kingdom: Animalia
- Phylum: Arthropoda
- Class: Insecta
- Order: Odonata
- Suborder: Zygoptera
- Family: Coenagrionidae
- Genus: Neoneura
- Species: N. maria

Binomial name
- Neoneura maria (Scudder, 1866)

Species of damselfly

Neoneura maria is a species of damselfly in the family Coenagrionidae. It is endemic to Cuba. Its natural habitats are subtropical or tropical moist lowland forests and rivers. It is threatened by habitat loss.
