= Arabineura khalidi =

Conservation status
- Endangered (IUCN 3.1)

Scientific classification
- Kingdom: Animalia
- Phylum: Arthropoda
- Class: Insecta
- Order: Odonata
- Suborder: Zygoptera
- Family: Platycnemididae
- Genus: Arabineura
- Species: A. khalidi

Binomial name
- Arabineura khalidi (Schneider, 1988)

Species of damselfly

Arabineura khalidi is a species of damselfly in the family Platycnemididae. It is found in Oman and United Arab Emirates. Its natural habitat is rivers. It is threatened by habitat loss.
