= Elattoneura tenax =

Scientific classification
- Kingdom: Animalia
- Phylum: Arthropoda
- Class: Insecta
- Order: Odonata
- Suborder: Zygoptera
- Family: Platycnemididae
- Genus: Elattoneura
- Species: E. tenax

Binomial name
- Elattoneura tenax (Hagen in Selys, 1860)

Species of damselfly

Elattoneura tenax is a species of damselfly in the family Platycnemididae known commonly as the red-striped threadtail. It is endemic to Sri Lanka.

== See also ==
- List of odonates of Sri Lanka
