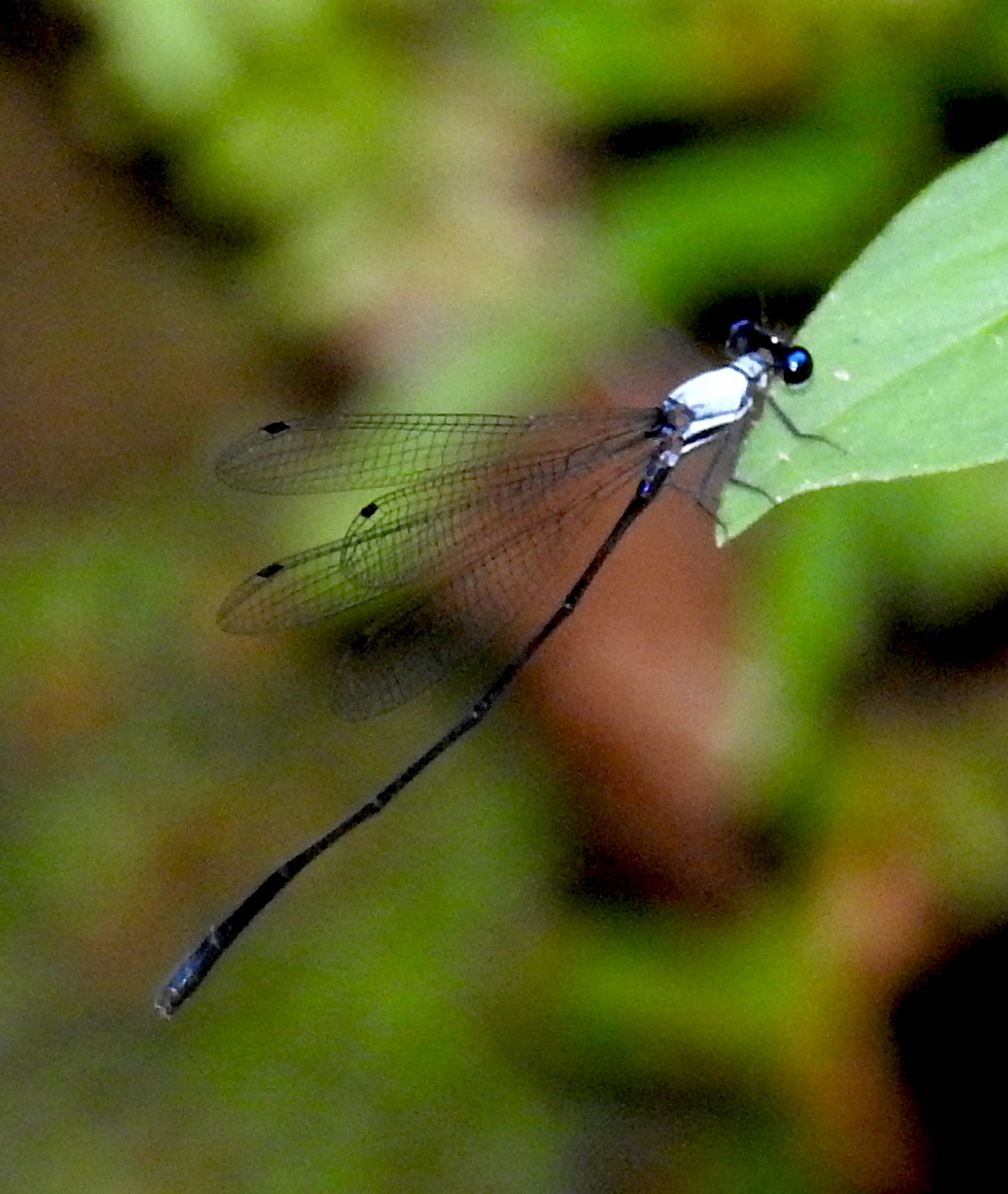

Conservation status
- Vulnerable (IUCN 3.1)

Scientific classification
- Kingdom: Animalia
- Phylum: Arthropoda
- Class: Insecta
- Order: Odonata
- Suborder: Zygoptera
- Family: Platycnemididae
- Genus: Elattoneura
- Species: E. caesia

Binomial name
- Elattoneura caesia (Hagen, 1860)

= Elattoneura caesia =

Species of damselfly

Elattoneura caesia is a species of damselfly in the family Platycnemididae known commonly as the jungle threadtail. It is endemic to Sri Lanka, where it is distributed across the central and southern parts of the island. It lives in streams and springs in primary rainforest habitat. It is considered to be vulnerable because of the destruction and degradation of local rainforest habitat.
