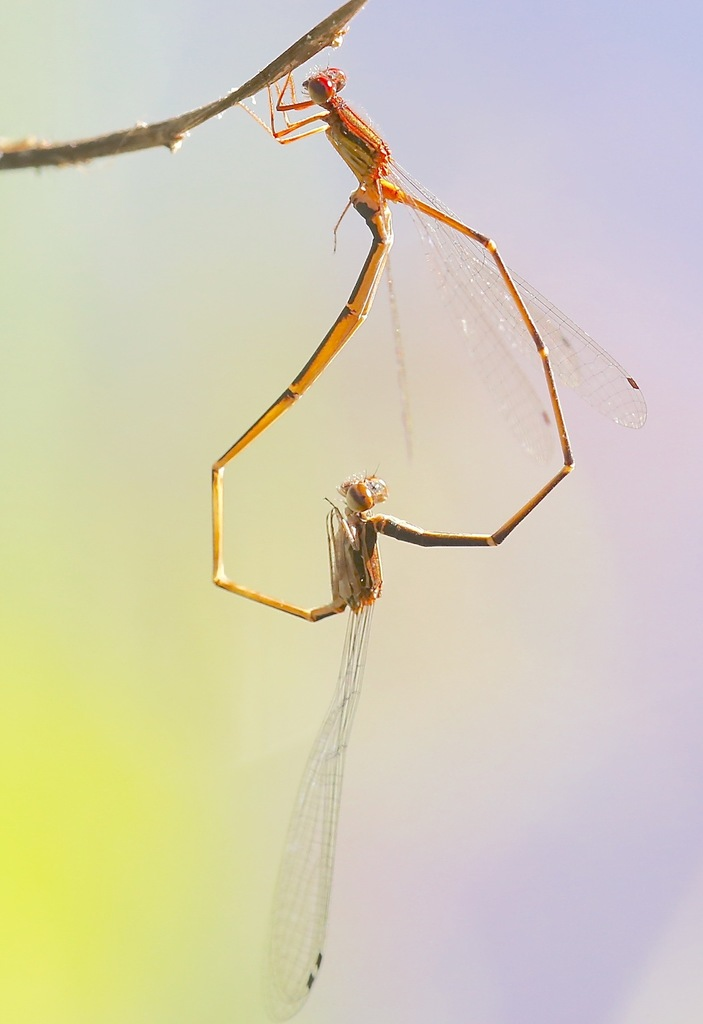
- Protoneura cara

Scientific classification
- Kingdom: Animalia
- Phylum: Arthropoda
- Clade: Pancrustacea
- Class: Insecta
- Order: Odonata
- Suborder: Zygoptera
- Family: Protoneuridae
- Genus: Protoneura; Selys, 1857

= Protoneura =

Genus of damselflies

Protoneura is a genus of slender Neotropical damselflies in the family Protoneuridae. Species occur from Central America to South America and are typically associated with streams and rivers in forested habitats.

== Description ==
Species of Protoneura are small, delicate damselflies with slender bodies and narrow wings. They typically perch on vegetation close to streams and other flowing waters. Males are often marked with contrasting dark and pale colour patterns, while females are generally more subdued in appearance.

In his original description, Sélys distinguished the genus by its simplified wing venation and narrow wings.

== Taxonomic history ==
Selys established Protoneura in 1853 as a new genus for species previously included within broader assemblages of damselflies. In 1871 he placed the genus within his "Legion Protoneura", an informal grouping that also included several genera now assigned to Platycnemididae and Platystictidae.

The genus subsequently became the type genus of the family-group taxon Protoneuridae. Molecular phylogenetic studies in the early twenty-first century led to major revisions of the traditional concept of Protoneuridae, but Protoneura remained within the restricted Neotropical lineage that was reinstated as the family Protoneuridae in 2025.

== Species ==
The following species are currently placed in Protoneura:

- Protoneura ailsa Donnelly, 1961
- Protoneura amatoria Calvert, 1907
- Protoneura aurantiaca Selys, 1886
- Protoneura caligata Hagen in Selys, 1886
- Protoneura calverti Williamson, 1915
- Protoneura capillaris (Rambur, 1842) - Black-fronted Threadtail
- Protoneura cara Calvert, 1903 - Orange-striped Threadtail
- Protoneura corculum Calvert, 1907
- Protoneura cupida Calvert, 1903
- Protoneura dunklei Daigle, 1990
- Protoneura klugi Cowley, 1941
- Protoneura macintyrei Kennedy, 1939
- Protoneura paucinervis Selys, 1886
- Protoneura peramans Calvert, 1902
- Protoneura rojiza González, 1992
- Protoneura romanae Meurgey, 2006
- Protoneura sanguinipes Westfall, 1987 - Red-legged Threadtail
- Protoneura scintilla Gloyd, 1939
- Protoneura sulfurata Donnelly, 1989 - Sulphury Threadtail
- Protoneura tenuis Selys, 1860 - Scarlet-backed Threadtail
- Protoneura viridis Westfall, 1964
- Protoneura woytkowskii Gloyd, 1939

== Etymology ==
The generic name Protoneura is formed from the Greek πρῶτος (prôtos, "first" or "primary") and νεῦρον (neûron, "nerve" or "sinew"), the latter often used in entomology to refer to a wing vein. It likely refers to the reduced and simplified wing venation emphasised in Sélys' original description of the genus.
