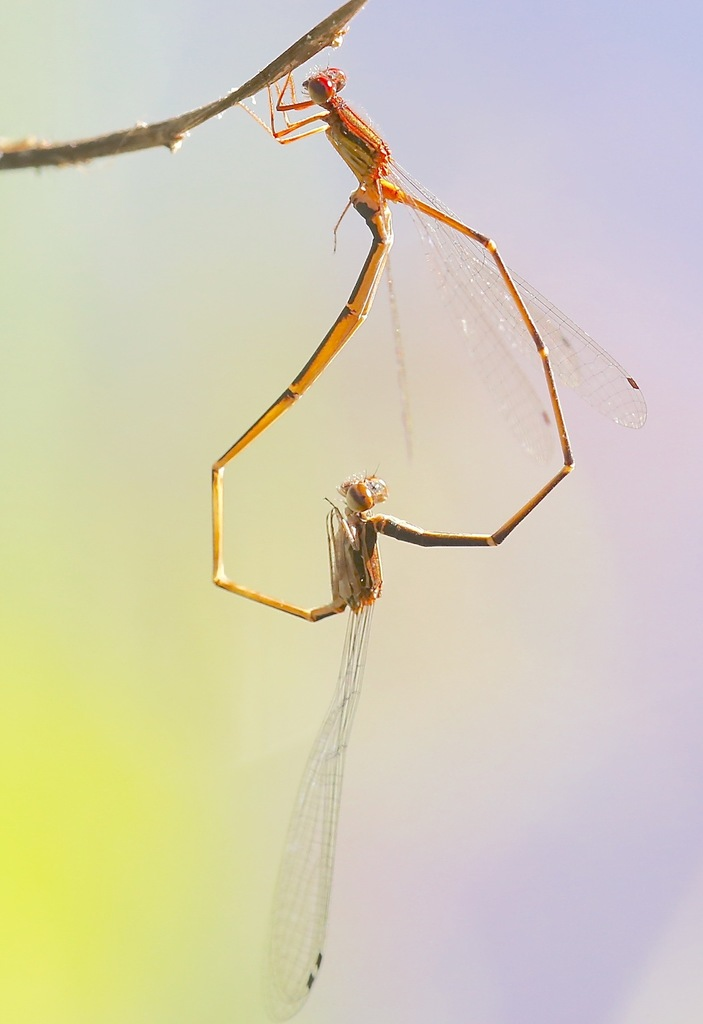

Conservation status
- Least Concern (IUCN 3.1)

Scientific classification
- Kingdom: Animalia
- Phylum: Arthropoda
- Class: Insecta
- Order: Odonata
- Suborder: Zygoptera
- Family: Coenagrionidae
- Genus: Protoneura
- Species: P. cara

Binomial name
- Protoneura cara Calvert, 1903

= Protoneura cara =

Species of damselfly

Protoneura cara, the orange-striped threadtail, is a species of narrow-winged damselfly in the family Coenagrionidae, superfamily Coenagrionoidea. It is found in Central America and North America.

The IUCN conservation status of Protoneura cara is "LC", least concern, with no immediate threat to the species' survival. The population is stable. The IUCN status was reviewed in 2017.
