= Disparoneurinae =

Scientific classification
- Kingdom: Animalia
- Phylum: Arthropoda
- Clade: Pancrustacea
- Class: Insecta
- Order: Odonata
- Suborder: Zygoptera
- Family: Platycnemididae
- Subfamily: Disparoneurinae; Fraser, 1957

Genera
- Arabineura; Caconeura; Disparoneura; Elattoneura; Esme; Melanoneura; Nososticta; Phylloneura; Prodasineura

Subfamily of damselflies

Disparoneurinae is a subfamily of damselflies in the family Platycnemididae. World Odonata List places nine genera in the subfamily.

== Taxonomic history ==
Fraser established Disparoneurinae in 1957 as a subfamily of Protoneuridae. In 2014, Dijkstra and colleagues placed the Old World groups then classified as Protoneuridae within an expanded Platycnemididae, and recognized Disparoneurinae as one of its subfamilies.
