= Protoneura dunklei =

Conservation status
- Least Concern (IUCN 3.1)

Scientific classification
- Kingdom: Animalia
- Phylum: Arthropoda
- Class: Insecta
- Order: Odonata
- Suborder: Zygoptera
- Family: Coenagrionidae
- Genus: Protoneura
- Species: P. dunklei

Binomial name
- Protoneura dunklei Daigle, 1990

Species of damselfly

Protoneura dunklei is a species of damselfly in the family Coenagrionidae. It is found in the Dominican Republic and possibly Haiti. Its natural habitats are subtropical or tropical moist lowland forests and rivers. It is threatened by habitat loss.
