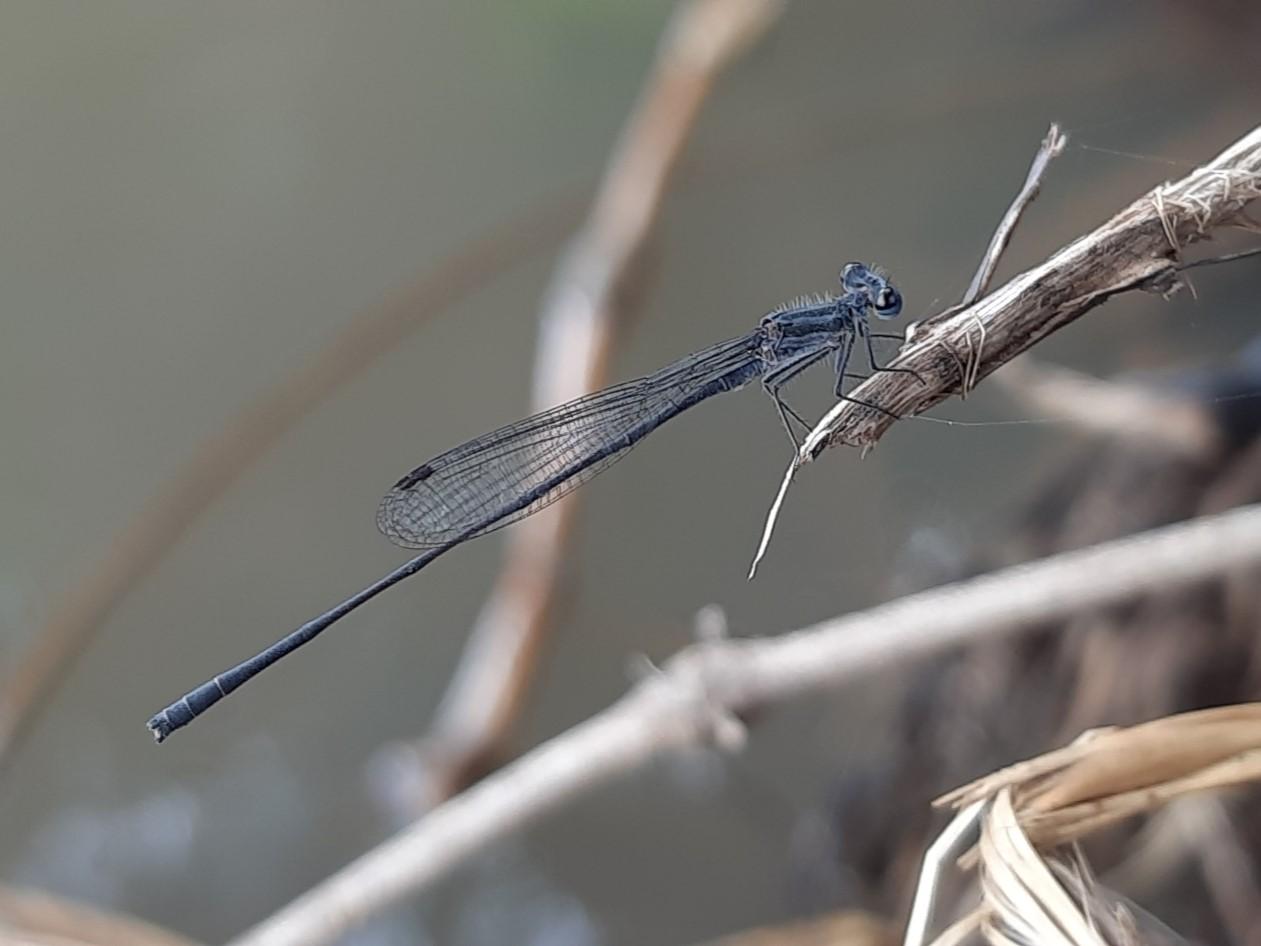
- Male

Conservation status
- Data Deficient (IUCN 3.1)

Scientific classification
- Kingdom: Animalia
- Phylum: Arthropoda
- Clade: Pancrustacea
- Class: Insecta
- Order: Odonata
- Suborder: Zygoptera
- Family: Platycnemididae
- Genus: Elattoneura
- Species: E. nigerrima

Binomial name
- Elattoneura nigerrima (Laidlaw, 1917)

Synonyms
- Disparoneura nigerrima Laidlaw,1917

= Elattoneura nigerrima =

Species of damselfly

Elattoneura nigerrima, the Deccan threadtail or blue and black bambootail, is a damselfly species in the family Platycnemididae. This damselfly can be found in rivers, streams, canals of Deccan and it is native to India.

== Range ==
It is recorded from Deccan part of India, but still data about its distribution and habitat is less known for now.

== Habitat and ecology ==
These specimens were found on vegetations in the riverside. Some males are found to hover on the river.
