= Elattoneura frenulata =

Conservation status
- Least Concern (IUCN 3.1)

Scientific classification
- Kingdom: Animalia
- Phylum: Arthropoda
- Class: Insecta
- Order: Odonata
- Suborder: Zygoptera
- Family: Platycnemididae
- Genus: Elattoneura
- Species: E. frenulata

Binomial name
- Elattoneura frenulata (Hagen, 1860)

Synonyms
- Disparoneura frenulata Hagen, 1860

Species of damselfly

Elattoneura frenulata is a species of damselfly in the family Platycnemididae known commonly as the sooty threadtail or Roetswartdraadstertjie. It is endemic to South Africa. It is a localised endemic of montane areas of the Western Cape, marginally expanding into the western parts of the Eastern Cape. Though it has a restricted distribution, it is locally common. It lives near slow-moving rivers with abundant vegetation.

== Description ==
This is a small damselfly (length: 35 mm (1.4 in), wingspan up to 46 mm (1.8 in)). The black eyes are far apart and it lacks postocular spots. In males, the thorax and abdomen re a sooty black above and blue or grey-white below. The terminal segments are blue-grey. Females have a brown abdomen and thorax and may be confused with Elattoneura glauca when young.

== Distribution and habitat ==
The sooty threadtail occurs primarily in the Western Cape of South Africa, although its range does extend slightly into the Eastern Cape. It is a localised endemic of montane areas, most frequently encountered in areas where a stream narrows between bushes over a small stream where it breeds. It prefers rivers with pools and slow moving sections and is often found among tall grass.

== Ecology ==
This species perches low down on grass stems and other stream side vegetation. It will also frequently sit on rocks or bare ground close to the water. They are generally sluggish and reluctant to fly. It has a hovering flight when disturbed and will not fly far, quickly settling on a new perch.

== Conservation ==
While it has a restricted distribution, this species locally common. As such, it is listed as least concern by the IUCN. It is moderately sensitive to habitat damage as it requires clean, clear water, but does occur in habitats with some alien vegetation. It readily makes use of suitable man-made bodies of still water along streams and rivers.
