= Protoneura capillaris =

Conservation status
- Data Deficient (IUCN 3.1)

Scientific classification
- Kingdom: Animalia
- Phylum: Arthropoda
- Class: Insecta
- Order: Odonata
- Suborder: Zygoptera
- Family: Coenagrionidae
- Genus: Protoneura
- Species: P. capillaris

Binomial name
- Protoneura capillaris (Rambur, 1842)

Species of damselfly

Protoneura capillaris is a species of damselfly in the family Coenagrionidae. It is endemic to Cuba. Its natural habitats are subtropical or tropical moist lowland forests and rivers. It is threatened by habitat loss.
