= Elattoneura cellularis =

Conservation status
- Least Concern (IUCN 3.1)

Scientific classification
- Kingdom: Animalia
- Phylum: Arthropoda
- Class: Insecta
- Order: Odonata
- Suborder: Zygoptera
- Family: Platycnemididae
- Genus: Elattoneura
- Species: E. cellularis

Binomial name
- Elattoneura cellularis (Grünberg, 1902)

Synonyms
- Chlorocnemis cellularis (Grünberg, 1902); Elattoneura tropicalis Pinhey, 1974; Isomecocnemis cellularis Grünberg, 1902

Species of damselfly

Elattoneura cellularis is a species of damselfly in the family Platycnemididae. It is native to the southern half of Africa, where it is widespread from Angola to Mozambique. It lives in tropical rivers and streams.
