= Neoneura aaroni =

Conservation status
- Least Concern (IUCN 3.1)

Scientific classification
- Domain: Eukaryota
- Kingdom: Animalia
- Phylum: Arthropoda
- Class: Insecta
- Order: Odonata
- Suborder: Zygoptera
- Family: Coenagrionidae
- Genus: Neoneura
- Species: N. aaroni

Binomial name
- Neoneura aaroni Calvert, 1903

Species of damselfly

Neoneura aaroni, the coral-fronted threadtail, is a species of threadtail in the family of damselflies known as Coenagrionidae. It is found in Central America and North America.

The IUCN conservation status of Neoneura aaroni is "LC", least concern, with no immediate threat to the species' survival. The population is stable.
