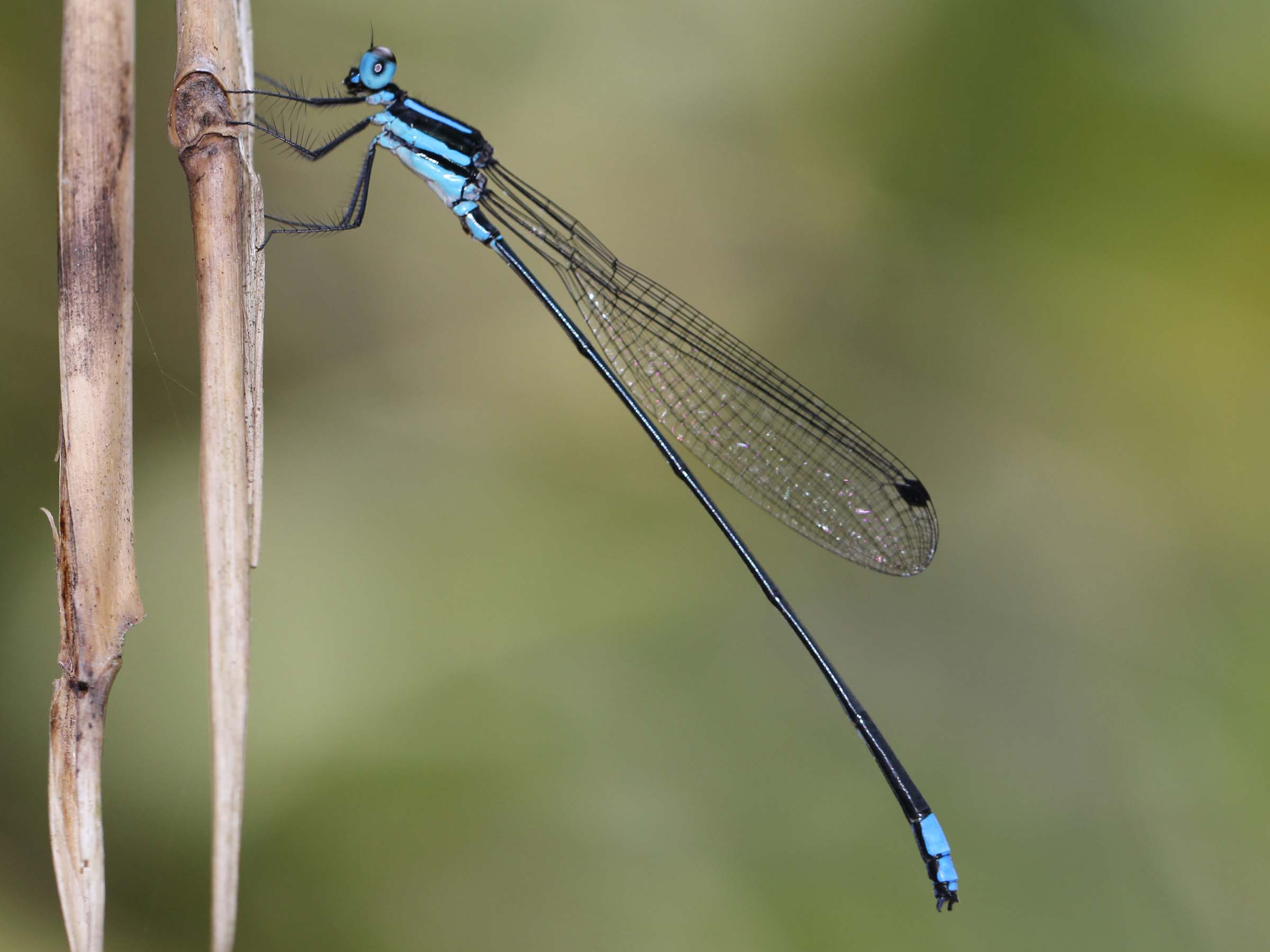
- male

Conservation status
- Data Deficient (IUCN 3.1)

Scientific classification
- Kingdom: Animalia
- Phylum: Arthropoda
- Clade: Pancrustacea
- Class: Insecta
- Order: Odonata
- Suborder: Zygoptera
- Family: Platycnemididae
- Subfamily: Disparoneurinae
- Genus: Esme
- Species: E. mudiensis

Binomial name
- Esme mudiensis Fraser, 1931

= Esme mudiensis =

Species of damselfly

Esme mudiensis is a damselfly in the family Platycnemididae. It is commonly known as the Travancore bambootail. It is endemic to the Western Ghats in India, particularly south of Palakkad Gap.

== Description and habitat ==
It is a medium-sized damselfly with black-capped blue eyes. Its thorax is velvet-black on the dorsum and azure blue on the sides. The dorsum is marked with narrow ante-humeral blue stripes, and there is another moderately broad black stripe over the postero-lateral suture. The base of the sides is pale blue. Wings are transparent with black and diamond shaped pterostigma. The abdomen is black, marked with azure blue on segment 1 and 2. Segments 3 to 6 have very narrow baso-dorsal annules. Segments 8 to 10 are blue. There is a narrow black basal annule on segment 8. The ventral borders of all segments are broadly black. Anal appendages are black. The female is similar to the male, but with a more robust build.

It can be easily distinguished from other species of Esme by the labrum being entirely unmarked with metallic blue-black.

It is usually found along hill streams, and seen perched on riparian vegetation.

== See also ==
- List of odonates of India
- List of odonata of Kerala
