= Elattoneura flavifacies =

Conservation status
- Data Deficient (IUCN 3.1)

Scientific classification
- Kingdom: Animalia
- Phylum: Arthropoda
- Clade: Pancrustacea
- Class: Insecta
- Order: Odonata
- Suborder: Zygoptera
- Family: Platycnemididae
- Genus: Elattoneura
- Species: E. flavifacies

Binomial name
- Elattoneura flavifacies (Pinhey, 1981)

Synonyms
- Prodasineura flavifacies Pinhey, 1981

Species of damselfly

Elattoneura flavifacies is a species of damselfly in the family Platycnemididae. It is endemic to Zambia.
